= 2002–03 Serie D =

Campionato Nazionale Dilettanti
- Season: 2002–03
- Champions: Cavese
- Promoted: Pizzighettone; Palazzolo; Ivrea; Seregno; Belluno; Cologna Veneta; Ravenna; Bellaria Igea Marina; Cappiano Romaiano; Sansovino; Rosetana; Tolentino; Isernia; Boys Caivanese; Melfi; Rutigliano
- Relegated: Sancolombano (repecheaged); Bergamasca; Fanfulla; Pinerolo; Atletico Calcio (repecheaged); Verbania; Caratese; Guanzatese; Tamai (repecheaged); Montecchio (repecheaged); Monfalcone; Sevegliano; Poggese (repecheaged); Virtus Pavullese; Massa Lombarda; Crociati Parma; Sangimignano (repecheaged); Viareggio; Cerretese; Fucecchio; Rieti (repecheaged); Maceratese (repecheaged); Umbertide Tiberis; Angelana; Termoli (repecheaged); Terracina (repecheaged); Ferentino; Anagni; Ariano (repecheaged); Ostuni; Ebolitana; Casarano; Delianuova; Lentini (repecheaged); Orlandina; Belpasso

The 2002–03 Serie D was the fifty-fifth edition of Serie D, at the time the fifth highest league in the Italian football league system.

A total of 162 teams contested the league, divided into nine groups (in Italian: Gironi) of 18 teams.

== League tables ==
=== Girone A ===
Pos	Team	Pld	W	D	L	GF	GA	GD	Pts	
1	Pizzighettone (P)	34	15	12	7	51	33	+18	57	Promotion to Serie C2
2	Cuneo	34	13	15	6	36	23	+13	54	Qualification to promotion play-offs
3	U.S.O. Calcio	34	12	17	5	47	36	+11	53	Qualification to promotion play-offs
4	Palazzolo (P, O)	34	14	11	9	43	39	+4	53	Qualification to promotion play-offs
5	Casale	34	14	10	10	39	32	+7	52	
6	Vigevano	34	13	13	8	56	52	+4	52	
7	Voghera	34	13	12	9	54	27	+27	51	
8	Sant'Angelo (Note: Sant'Angelo were docked 4 points.)	34	14	13	7	52	42	+10	51	
9	Rodengo Saiano (Note: Rodengo Saiano were docked 12 points.)	34	16	13	5	46	30	+16	49	
10	Pergocrema	34	11	13	10	41	44	−3	46	
11	Trino	34	11	10	13	37	35	+2	43	
12	Canavese	34	10	12	12	39	44	−5	42	
13	Fiorenzuola (O)	34	10	11	13	52	57	−5	41	Qualification to relegation play-offs
14	Robbio (O)	34	8	11	15	49	51	−2	35	Qualification to relegation play-offs
15	Sancolombano (R)	34	6	16	12	35	55	−20	34	Qualification to relegation play-offs
16	Bergamasca (R)	34	6	15	13	32	39	−7	33	Qualification to relegation play-offs
17	Fanfulla (R)	34	6	12	16	32	52	−20	30	Relegation to Eccellenza
18	Pinerolo (R)	34	3	6	25	29	79	−50	15	Relegation to Eccellenza

Updated to match(es) played on June 2003. Source: RSSSF.com
(O) Play-off winners; (P) Promoted; (R) Relegated

==== Promotion play-offs ====
Pos	Team	Pld	W	D	L	GF	GA	GD	Pts
1	Palazzolo	2	1	1	0	3	1	+2	4
2	Cuneo	2	1	0	1	5	3	+2	3
3	U.S.O. Calcio	2	0	1	1	2	6	−4	1

Source: RSSSF.com

Palazzolo	1–1	U.S.O. Calcio
Cuneo	2–0	Palazzolo
U.S.O. Calcio	1–5	Cuneo

==== Relegation play-offs ====
Team 1	Agg.	Team 2	1st leg	2nd leg
Bergamasca	2–3	Fiorenzuola	0–0	2–3
Sancolombano	0–3	Robbio	0–2	0–1

=== Girone B ===
Pos	Team	Pld	W	D	L	GF	GA	GD	Pts	
1	Ivrea (P)	34	25	4	5	61	29	+32	79	Promotion to Serie C2
2	Canzese	34	23	4	7	66	39	+27	73	Qualification to promotion play-offs
3	Seregno (P, O)	34	20	7	7	71	38	+33	67	Qualification to promotion play-offs
4	Cossatese	34	20	5	9	66	40	+26	65	Qualification to promotion play-offs
5	Villacidrese	34	20	5	9	52	30	+22	65	
6	Borgomanero	34	18	6	10	64	37	+27	60	
7	Calangianus	34	18	6	10	58	36	+22	60	
8	Oggiono	34	12	10	12	47	47	0	46	
9	Pro Lissone	34	10	12	12	45	44	+1	42	
10	Valle d'Aosta	34	10	11	13	52	57	−5	41	
11	Castellettese	34	10	10	14	37	50	−13	40	
12	Real Cesate Saronno	34	12	4	18	37	50	−13	40	
13	Olginatese (O)	34	10	9	15	44	55	−11	39	Qualification to relegation play-offs
14	Borgosesia (O)	34	11	5	18	44	58	−14	38	Qualification to relegation play-offs
15	Atletico Calcio (Note: Atletico Calcio were relegated to 2003–04 Eccellenza, but they were later admitted to 2003–04 Serie D through repechage.) (R)	34	9	8	17	51	59	−8	35	Qualification to relegation play-offs
16	Verbania (R)	34	8	7	19	32	51	−19	31	Qualification to relegation play-offs
17	Caratese (R)	34	4	9	21	34	81	−47	21	Relegation to Eccellenza
18	Guanzatese (R)	34	3	4	27	22	82	−60	13	Relegation to Eccellenza

Updated to match(es) played on June 2003. Source: RSSSF.com
(O) Play-off winners; (P) Promoted; (R) Relegated

==== Promotion play-offs ====
Pos	Team	Pld	W	D	L	GF	GA	GD	Pts
1	Seregno	2	1	1	0	6	3	+3	4
2	Canzese	2	1	1	0	5	4	+1	4
3	Cossatese	2	0	0	2	3	7	−4	0

Source: RSSSF.com

Cossatese	1–4	Seregno
Canzese	3–2	Cossatese
Seregno	2–2	Canzese

==== Relegation play-offs ====
Team 1	Agg.	Team 2	1st leg	2nd leg
Verbania	2–4	Olginatese	2–1	0–3
Atletico Calcio	3–3	Borgosesia	2–0	1–3

=== Girone C ===
Pos	Team	Pld	W	D	L	GF	GA	GD	Pts	
1	Belluno (P)	34	24	4	6	58	21	+37	76	Promotion to Serie C2
2	Bassano Virtus	34	21	7	6	51	28	+23	70	Qualification to promotion play-offs
3	Santa Lucia	34	16	11	7	40	25	+15	59	Qualification to promotion play-offs
4	Cologna Veneta (P, O)	34	15	13	6	50	32	+18	58	Qualification to promotion play-offs
5	Portogruaro	34	15	11	8	45	35	+10	56	
6	Conegliano	34	14	12	8	42	29	+13	54	
7	Itala San Marco	34	13	9	12	45	46	−1	48	
8	Cordignano	34	12	11	11	41	45	−4	47	
9	Città di Jesolo	34	10	14	10	44	41	+3	44	
10	Sanvitese	34	11	11	12	34	40	−6	44	
11	Chioggia Sottomarina	34	10	11	13	29	36	−7	41	
12	Mezzocorona	34	10	8	16	27	31	−4	38	
13	Tamai (Note: Tamai were relegated to 2003–04 Eccellenza, but they were later admitted to 2003–04 Serie D through repechage.) (R)	34	8	14	12	38	41	−3	38	Qualification to relegation play-offs
14	Montecchio (Note: Montecchio were relegated to 2003–04 Eccellenza, but they were later admitted to 2003–04 Serie D through repechage.) (R)	34	7	12	15	33	42	−9	33	Qualification to relegation play-offs
15	Lonigo (O)	34	5	17	12	29	35	−6	32	Qualification to relegation play-offs
16	Pievigina (O)	34	8	6	20	22	49	−27	30	Qualification to relegation play-offs
17	Monfalcone (R)	34	7	7	20	29	59	−30	28	Relegation to Eccellenza
18	Sevegliano (R)	34	4	14	16	32	54	−22	26	Relegation to Eccellenza

Updated to match(es) played on June 2003. Source: RSSSF.com
(O) Play-off winners; (P) Promoted; (R) Relegated

==== Promotion play-offs ====
Pos	Team	Pld	W	D	L	GF	GA	GD	Pts
1	Cologna Veneta	2	1	1	0	3	2	+1	4
2	Bassano Virtus	2	0	2	0	1	1	0	2
3	Santa Lucia	2	0	1	1	1	2	−1	1

Source: RSSSF.com

Santa Lucia	0–0	Bassano Virtus
Cologna Veneta	2–1	Santa Lucia
Bassano Virtus	1–1	Cologna Veneta

==== Relegation play-offs ====
Team 1	Agg.	Team 2	1st leg	2nd leg
Pievigina	3–1	Tamai	1–1	2–0
Lonigo	2–1	Montecchio	2–1	0–0

=== Girone D ===
Pos	Team	Pld	W	D	L	GF	GA	GD	Pts	
1	Ravenna (P)	34	19	11	4	57	32	+25	68	Promotion to Serie C2
2	Real Montecchio	34	19	10	5	49	27	+22	67	Qualification to promotion play-offs
3	Rovigo	34	17	10	7	38	26	+12	61	Qualification to promotion play-offs
4	Bellaria Igea Marina (P, O)	34	16	11	7	52	37	+15	59	Qualification to promotion play-offs
5	Cagliese	34	14	14	6	41	29	+12	56	
6	Santarcangiolese	34	13	9	12	52	51	+1	48	
7	Castel San Pietro	34	9	18	7	44	39	+5	45	
8	Valleverde Riccione	34	11	12	11	37	36	+1	45	
9	Mezzolara	34	12	9	13	44	47	−3	45	
10	Faenza	34	11	12	11	33	38	−5	45	
11	Carpi	34	10	12	12	42	39	+3	42	
12	Russi	34	11	8	15	44	49	−5	41	
13	Boca San Lazzaro (O)	34	10	10	14	47	47	0	40	Qualification to relegation play-offs
14	Crevalcore (O)	34	7	13	14	34	41	−7	34	Qualification to relegation play-offs
15	Poggese (Note: Poggese were relegated to 2003–04 Eccellenza, but they were later admitted to 2003–04 Serie D through repechage.) (R)	34	8	10	16	44	60	−16	34	Qualification to relegation play-offs
16	Virtus Pavullese (R)	34	6	14	14	40	57	−17	32	Qualification to relegation play-offs
17	Massa Lombarda (R)	34	5	14	15	30	44	−14	29	Relegation to Eccellenza
18	Crociati Parma (R)	34	3	13	18	30	59	−29	22	Relegation to Eccellenza

Updated to match(es) played on June 2003. Source: RSSSF.com
(O) Play-off winners; (P) Promoted; (R) Relegated

==== Promotion play-offs ====
Pos	Team	Pld	W	D	L	GF	GA	GD	Pts
1	Bellaria Igea Marina	2	1	1	0	4	2	+2	4
2	Rovigo	2	1	0	1	2	2	0	3
3	Real Montecchio	2	0	1	1	2	4	−2	1

Source: RSSSF.com

Bellaria Igea Marina	2–0	Rovigo
Rovigo	2–0	Real Montecchio
Real Montecchio	2–2	Bellaria Igea Marina

==== Relegation play-offs ====
Team 1	Agg.	Team 2	1st leg	2nd leg
Virtus Pavullese	0–3	Boca San Lazzaro	0–2	0–1
Poggese	0–2	Crevalcore	0–1	0–1

=== Girone E ===
Pos	Team	Pld	W	D	L	GF	GA	GD	Pts	
1	Cappiano Romaiano (P)	34	18	15	1	51	23	+28	69	Promotion to Serie C2
2	Sansovino (P, O)	34	17	13	4	56	31	+25	64	Qualification to promotion play-offs
3	Massese	34	17	11	6	58	34	+24	62	Qualification to promotion play-offs
4	Sanremese	34	14	13	7	48	30	+18	55	Qualification to promotion play-offs
5	Larcianese	34	13	11	10	44	41	+3	50	
6	Fortis Juventus	34	13	10	11	39	34	+5	49	
7	Cascina	34	10	17	7	29	22	+7	47	
8	Imperia	34	12	10	12	34	43	−9	46	
9	Rondinella	34	10	13	11	42	36	+6	43	
10	Versilia 98 (Note: Versilia 98 were docked 2 points.)	34	9	16	9	25	24	+1	41	
11	Venturina	34	10	11	13	34	41	−7	41	
12	Lavagnese	34	9	13	12	25	39	−14	40	
13	Sangimignano (Note: Sangimignano were docked 4 points. They were relegated to 2003–04 Eccellenza, but they were later admitted to 2003–04 Serie D through repechage.) (R)	34	9	17	8	26	23	+3	40	Qualification to relegation play-offs
14	Vado (O)	34	10	9	15	40	54	−14	39	Qualification to relegation play-offs
15	Viareggio (R)	34	8	13	13	38	48	−10	37	Qualification to relegation play-offs
16	Nuova Chiusi (O)	34	6	12	16	34	41	−7	30	Qualification to relegation play-offs
17	Cerretese (R)	34	5	11	18	31	54	−23	26	Relegation to Eccellenza
18	Fucecchio (R)	34	3	11	20	28	64	−36	20	Relegation to Eccellenza

Updated to match(es) played on June 2003. Source: RSSSF.com
(O) Play-off winners; (P) Promoted; (R) Relegated

==== Promotion play-offs ====
Pos	Team	Pld	W	D	L	GF	GA	GD	Pts
1	Sansovino	2	2	0	0	2	0	+2	6
2	Sanremese	2	1	0	1	2	2	0	3
3	Massese	2	0	0	2	1	3	−2	0

Source: RSSSF.com

Massese	0–1	Sansovino
Sanremese	2–1	Massese
Sansovino	1–0	Sanremese

==== Relegation play-offs ====
Team 1	Agg.	Team 2	1st leg	2nd leg
Nuova Chiusi	4–2	Sangimignano	2–1	2–1
Viareggio	2–2	Vado	1–0	1–2

=== Girone F ===
Pos	Team	Pld	W	D	L	GF	GA	GD	Pts	
1	Rosetana (P)	34	17	14	3	46	27	+19	65	Promotion to Serie C2
2	Tolentino (P, O)	34	18	9	7	54	33	+21	63	Qualification to promotion play-offs
3	Pro Vasto	34	15	13	6	42	27	+15	58	Qualification to promotion play-offs
4	Monterotondo	34	15	11	8	36	26	+10	56	Qualification to promotion play-offs
5	Monturanese	34	13	12	9	41	36	+5	51	
6	Sangiustese	34	11	15	8	30	34	−4	48	
7	Val di Sangro	34	12	11	11	44	44	0	47	
8	Truentina Castel di Lama	34	10	16	8	40	39	+1	46	
9	Sansepolcro	34	12	9	13	46	45	+1	45	
10	Vigor Senigallia	34	12	8	14	56	51	+5	44	
11	Todi	34	10	13	11	52	42	+10	43	
12	Morro d'Oro	34	10	13	11	50	42	+8	43	
13	Guidonia (O)	34	11	10	13	47	49	−2	43	Qualification to relegation play-offs
14	Orvietana (O)	34	10	12	12	32	37	−5	42	Qualification to relegation play-offs
15	Rieti (Note: Rieti were relegated to 2003–04 Eccellenza, but they were later admitted to 2003–04 Serie D through repechage.) (R)	34	11	8	15	45	40	+5	41	Qualification to relegation play-offs
16	Maceratese (Note: Maceratese were relegated to 2003–04 Eccellenza, but they were later admitted to 2003–04 Serie D through repechage.) (R)	34	10	8	16	31	41	−10	38	Qualification to relegation play-offs
17	Umbertide Tiberis (R)	34	8	11	15	30	48	−18	35	Relegation to Eccellenza
18	Angelana (R)	34	0	9	25	19	80	−61	9	Relegation to Eccellenza

Updated to match(es) played on June 2003. Source: RSSSF.com
(O) Play-off winners; (P) Promoted; (R) Relegated

==== Promotion play-offs ====
Pos	Team	Pld	W	D	L	GF	GA	GD	Pts
1	Tolentino	2	2	0	0	4	2	+2	6
2	Pro Vasto	2	1	0	1	4	3	+1	3
3	Monterotondo	2	0	0	2	2	5	−3	0

Source: RSSSF.com

Monterotondo	1–2	Tolentino
Pro Vasto	3–1	Monterotondo
Tolentino	2–1	Pro Vasto

==== Relegation play-offs ====
Team 1	Agg.	Team 2	1st leg	2nd leg
Maceratese	2–2	Guidonia	1–1	1–1
Rieti	1–1	Orvietana	1–0	0–1

=== Girone G ===
Pos	Team	Pld	W	D	L	GF	GA	GD	Pts	
1	Isernia (P)	34	19	7	8	58	33	+25	64	Promotion to Serie C2
2	Boys Caivanese (P, O)	34	16	13	5	41	25	+16	61	Qualification to promotion play-offs
3	Viribus Unitis	34	16	12	6	55	35	+20	60	Qualification to promotion play-offs
4	Aprilia	34	16	11	7	41	28	+13	59	Qualification to promotion play-offs
5	Marcianise (Note: Marcianise were docked 3 points.)	34	14	13	7	35	24	+11	52	
6	Battipagliese	34	14	10	10	46	51	−5	52	
7	Real Cassino	34	13	9	12	30	26	+4	48	
8	Paganese	34	12	12	10	38	40	−2	48	
9	Cisco Collatino	34	12	11	11	46	45	+1	47	
10	Albalonga	34	11	14	9	51	54	−3	47	
11	Astrea	34	11	12	11	42	36	+6	45	
12	Sorrento	34	10	13	11	27	33	−6	43	
13	Casertana (Note: Casertana were docked 1 point.) (O)	34	11	9	14	32	34	−2	41	Qualification to relegation play-offs
14	Nuovo Terzigno (O)	34	10	8	16	41	46	−5	38	Qualification to relegation play-offs
15	Termoli (Note: Termoli were relegated to 2003–04 Eccellenza, but they were later admitted to 2003–04 Serie D through repechage.) (R)	34	8	11	15	29	33	−4	35	Qualification to relegation play-offs
16	Terracina (Note: Terracina were relegated to 2003–04 Eccellenza, but they were later admitted to 2003–04 Serie D through repechage.) (R)	34	7	13	14	29	39	−10	34	Qualification to relegation play-offs
17	Ferentino (R)	34	7	8	19	28	44	−16	29	Relegation to Eccellenza
18	Anagni (R)	34	3	6	25	23	66	−43	15	Relegation to Eccellenza

Updated to match(es) played on June 2003. Source: RSSSF.com
(O) Play-off winners; (P) Promoted; (R) Relegated

==== Promotion play-offs ====
Pos	Team	Pld	W	D	L	GF	GA	GD	Pts
1	Boys Caivanese	2	1	1	0	6	1	+5	4
2	Aprilia	2	0	2	0	2	2	0	2
3	Viribus Unitis	2	0	1	1	1	6	−5	1

Source: RSSSF.com

Aprilia	1–1	Boys Caivanese
Viribus Unitis	1–1	Aprilia
Boys Caivanese	5–0	Viribus Unitis

==== Relegation play-offs ====
Team 1	Agg.	Team 2	1st leg	2nd leg
Terracina	1–1	Casertana	0–0	1–1
Termoli	1–1	Nuovo Terzigno	1–0	0–1

=== Girone H ===
Pos	Team	Pld	W	D	L	GF	GA	GD	Pts	
1	Melfi (P)	34	18	8	8	51	43	+8	62	Promotion to Serie C2
2	Materasassi	34	16	10	8	41	28	+13	58	Qualification to promotion play-offs
3	Manduria	34	16	10	8	47	34	+13	58	Qualification to promotion play-offs
4	Rutigliano (P, O)	34	14	12	8	56	39	+17	54	Qualification to promotion play-offs
5	Noicattaro	34	12	14	8	38	35	+3	50	
6	Nardò	34	12	11	11	42	39	+3	47	
7	Pomigliano	34	13	8	13	41	41	0	47	
8	Trani	34	10	16	8	34	33	+1	46	
9	Sangiuseppese	34	12	10	12	35	37	−2	46	
10	Manfredonia	34	9	18	7	48	39	+9	45	
11	Grottaglie	34	10	14	10	39	36	+3	44	
12	Angri	34	8	11	15	21	37	−16	35	
13	ASC Potenza (Note: ASC Potenza were docked 15 points.) (O)	34	13	10	11	42	37	+5	34	Qualification to relegation play-offs
14	Potenza (O)	34	5	19	10	29	38	−9	34	Qualification to relegation play-offs
15	Ariano (Note: Ariano were relegated to 2003–04 Eccellenza, but they were later admitted to 2003–04 Serie D through repechage.) (R)	34	6	15	13	31	32	−1	33	Qualification to relegation play-offs
16	Ostuni (R)	34	6	12	16	25	45	−20	30	Qualification to relegation play-offs
17	Ebolitana (Note: Ebolitana were docked 15 points.) (R)	34	12	8	14	26	34	−8	29	Relegation to Eccellenza
18	Casarano (R)	34	7	8	19	23	42	−19	29	Relegation to Eccellenza

Updated to match(es) played on June 2003. Source: RSSSF.com
(O) Play-off winners; (P) Promoted; (R) Relegated

==== Promotion play-offs ====
Pos	Team	Pld	W	D	L	GF	GA	GD	Pts
1	Rutigliano	2	1	1	0	2	1	+1	4
2	Materasassi	2	1	0	1	3	3	0	3
3	Manduria	2	0	1	1	3	4	−1	1

Source: RSSSF.com

Rutigliano	1–0	Materasassi
Materasassi	3–2	Manduria
Manduria	1–1	Rutigliano

==== Relegation play-offs ====
Team 1	Agg.	Team 2	1st leg	2nd leg
Ariano	1–1	Potenza	1–0	0–1
ASC Potenza	4–2	Ostuni	2–2	2–0

=== Girone I ===
Pos	Team	Pld	W	D	L	GF	GA	GD	Pts	
1	Cavese (P)	34	25	5	4	48	10	+38	80	Promotion to Serie C2
2	Vigor Lamezia	34	24	3	7	58	24	+34	75	Qualification to promotion play-offs
3	Siracusa	34	18	9	7	60	32	+28	63	Qualification to promotion play-offs
4	Vittoria (P, O)	34	15	10	9	48	26	+22	55	Qualification to promotion play-offs
5	Milazzo (Note: Milazzo were docked 1 point.)	34	15	7	12	46	37	+9	51	
6	Savoia	34	13	12	9	31	25	+6	51	
7	Trapani	34	13	9	12	46	49	−3	48	
8	Rossanese	34	12	9	13	39	34	+5	45	
9	Comprensorio Stabia	34	11	12	11	42	43	−1	45	
10	Pro Favara	34	12	9	13	37	43	−6	45	
11	Corigliano Schiavonea	34	12	8	14	43	43	0	44	
12	Marsala	34	12	8	14	39	41	−2	44	
13	Nuova Vibonese (O)	34	11	11	12	34	36	−2	44	Qualification to relegation play-offs
14	Castrovillari (O)	34	11	8	15	35	35	0	41	Qualification to relegation play-offs
15	Delianuova (R)	34	10	8	16	42	45	−3	38	Qualification to relegation play-offs
16	Lentini (Note: Lentini were relegated to 2003–04 Eccellenza, but they were later admitted to 2003–04 Serie D through repechage.) (R)	34	10	8	16	36	48	−12	38	Qualification to relegation play-offs
17	Orlandina (R)	34	8	9	17	31	51	−20	33	Relegation to Eccellenza
18	Belpasso (R)	34	0	3	31	17	110	−93	3	Relegation to Eccellenza

Updated to match(es) played on June 2003. Source: RSSSF.com
(O) Play-off winners; (P) Promoted; (R) Relegated

==== Promotion play-offs ====
Pos	Team	Pld	W	D	L	GF	GA	GD	Pts
1	Vittoria	2	1	0	1	3	2	+1	3
2	Siracusa	2	1	0	1	3	3	0	3
3	Vigor Lamezia	2	1	0	1	2	3	−1	3

Source: RSSSF.com

Vittoria	2–0	Vigor Lamezia
Vigor Lamezia	2–1	Siracusa
Siracusa	2–1	Vittoria

==== Relegation play-offs ====
Team 1	Agg.	Team 2	1st leg	2nd leg
Lentini	3–3	Nuova Vibonese	2–0	1–3
Delianuova	1–1	Castrovillari	1–0	0–1

== Scudetto playoffs ==
=== Preliminary rounds ===
==== Group A ====
Pos	Team	Pld	W	D	L	GF	GA	GD	Pts
1	Ivrea	2	2	0	0	5	1	+4	6
2	Pizzighettone	2	1	0	1	3	4	−1	3
3	Belluno	2	0	0	2	1	4	−3	0

Source: RSSSF.com

Belluno	0–2	Ivrea
Pizzighettone	2–1	Belluno
Ivrea	3–1	Pizzighettone

==== Group B ====
Pos	Team	Pld	W	D	L	GF	GA	GD	Pts
1	Ravenna	2	1	1	0	2	1	+1	4
2	Cappiano Romaiano	2	1	0	1	2	2	0	3
3	Rosetana	2	0	1	1	1	2	−1	1

Source: RSSSF.com

Cappiano Romaiano	2–1	Rosetana
Rosetana	0–0	Ravenna
Ravenna	1–0	Cappiano Romaiano

==== Group C ====
Pos	Team	Pld	W	D	L	GF	GA	GD	Pts
1	Cavese	2	2	0	0	4	1	+3	6
2	Isernia	2	1	0	1	3	3	0	3
3	Melfi	2	0	0	2	2	5	−3	0

Source: RSSSF.com

Melfi	1–2	Cavese
Isernia	3–1	Melfi
Cavese	2–0	Isernia

=== Final rounds ===
==== Semi-finals ====
First leg played on 8 June 2003 in Pescara; second leg played on 15 June 2003 in Vicenza

Team 1	Agg.	Team 2	1st leg	2nd leg
Ivrea	1–2	Cavese	0–2	1–0

First leg played on 8 June 2003 in Avellino; second leg played on 15 June 2003 in Bologna

Team 1	Agg.	Team 2	1st leg	2nd leg
Isernia	3–3 (a)	Ravenna	1–0	2–3

==== Final ====
Played on 21 June 2003 in Civitavecchia.

Team 1	Score	Team 2
Cavese	0–0 (4–2 p)	Isernia
