= Davide Capello =

Italian footballer (born 1984)

Personal information
- Full name: Davide Ugo Capello
- Date of birth: 27 September 1984 (age 42)
- Place of birth: Nuoro, Italy
- Height: 1.87 m (6 ft 2 in)
- Position: Goalkeeper

Youth career
- Cagliari

Senior career*
Years	Team	Apps	(Gls)
2003–2005	Cagliari	2	(0)
2005	→ Belluno (loan)	11	(0)
2005–2007	Olbia	5	(0)
2007–2008	Nuorese	7	(0)
2008–2009	Alghero	8	(0)
2009–2013	Budoni	48	(0)
2013	Savona	1	(0)
Total		82	(0)

International career
2004	Italy U20	3	(0)
2005	Italy Mediterranean	1	(0)
- * Club domestic league appearances and goals

Davide Ugo Capello (born 27 September 1984) is a former Italian professional footballer who played as a goalkeeper.

== Club career ==
Born in Nuoro, Sardinia, Capello started his career at Sardinian side Cagliari. During the 2002–03 season, due to the suspension of Armando Pantanelli, he played as Paolo Mancini's backup on 26 January 2003 against Venezia. He won promotion to Serie A as Serie B Runner-up in 2004. He was the third keeper behind Gennaro Iezzo and Fanis Katergiannakis in 2004–05 Serie A season. In January 2005, he left for Belluno in exchange with Luca Tomasig. In August 2005, he left for Olbia in co-ownership deal. In January 2007, he left for Nuorese. In the 2008–09 season, he played for Alghero and in the 2009–10 season he played for Serie D side Budoni.

In July 2013 he joined Savona as goalkeeping coach, however he also played once for the first team. In December 2013 he returned to Sardinia.

== International career ==
In 2004, Capello was called up to the Italy U20 team (U21 feeder team) and played 3 times. In 2005, he was called to Italy U21 B team specially for 2005 Mediterranean Games, for a preparation match against Serie D Best XI. He played his only match with the team against Morocco.

== Personal life ==
After retirement in December 2013, Capello started work as a firefighter.

Capello was one of the survivors of Ponte Morandi bridge collapsing on 14 August 2018; his car fell 30 metres (100 ft), but he managed to walk away unscathed.
