= Luca La Rosa =

Italian footballer

Personal information
- Date of birth: 20 September 1988 (age 38)
- Place of birth: Olbia, Italy
- Height: 1.80 m (5 ft 11 in)
- Position: Midfielder

Team information
- Current team: FBC Calangianus 1905
- Number: 3

Senior career*
Years	Team	Apps	(Gls)
2006–2008	Olbia	2	(0)
2008–2009	Calangianus	32	(1)
2009–2010	Arzachena	31	(2)
2010–2013	Olbia	80	(10)
2013–2015	San Teodoro	56	(9)
2015–2019	Arzachena	103	(6)
2019–2025	Olbia	150	(10)
2025	ASD Polisportiva Calcio Budoni		
2025–	FBC Calangianus 1905		
- * Club domestic league appearances and goals as of 8 March 2026

Luca La Rosa (born 20 September 1988) is an Italian professional footballer who plays as a midfielder for Eccellenza Sardinia club FBC Calangianus 1905.

== Club career ==
Born in Olbia, La Rosa started his career for local club Olbia Calcio on Serie C2. He made his debut on 28 January 2007 against Varese. He played another match the next season, and left the club and joined to Serie D club Calangianus, and the next season he played with Arzachena.

La Rosa returned to Olbia in the 2010–2011 season, this time in Eccellenza. He played for three years for the club.

After played two season with modest US San Teodoro, in 2015 he signed with Arzachena on Serie D. He played four years for the club, winning the promotion to Serie C in 2016–17 Serie D. La Rosa made his Serie C debut on 27 August 2017 against Arezzo.

On 27 May 2019, he returned again to Olbia, on Serie C. On 6 June 2021, he extended his contract with the club.

On 16 January 2025, after 6 seasons in Olbia, he joined Eccellenza Sardinia side ASD Polisportiva Calcio Budoni, winning the league.

On 26 August 2025, he returned after 16 years to FBC Calangianus 1905.
