= Andrea Cocco =

Italian footballer (born 1986)

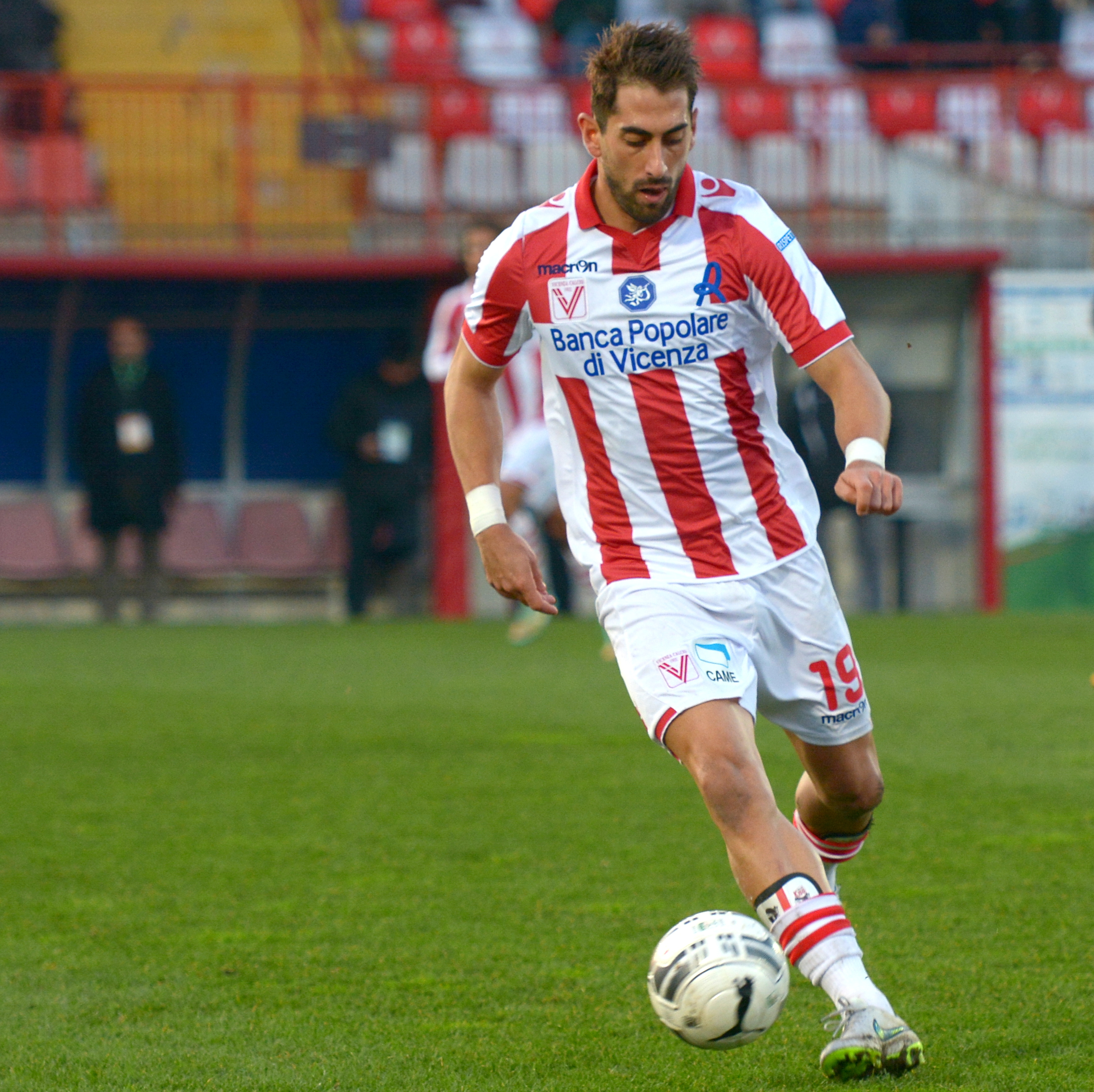
- Cocco in 2014

Personal information
- Full name: Andrea Salvatore Cocco
- Date of birth: 8 April 1986 (age 40)
- Place of birth: Cagliari, Italy
- Height: 1.82 m (6 ft 0 in)
- Position: Forward

Youth career
- –2006: Cagliari

Senior career*
Years	Team	Apps	(Gls)
2005–2008	Cagliari	8	(1)
2007	→ Venezia (loan)	9	(2)
2007–2008	→ Pistoiese (loan)	12	(1)
2008–2009	Rovigo	17	(3)
2009–2010	Alghero	28	(13)
2010	Cagliari	0	(0)
2010–2011	AlbinoLeffe	30	(5)
2011–2012	Cagliari	0	(0)
2011–2012	→ AlbinoLeffe (loan)	31	(12)
2012	AlbinoLeffe	0	(0)
2012–2014	Verona	16	(1)
2013–2014	→ Reggina (loan)	18	(1)
2014	→ Beira-Mar (loan)	12	(4)
2014–2015	Vicenza	37	(20)
2015–2019	Pescara	34	(3)
2016–2017	→ Frosinone (loan)	9	(1)
2017	→ Cesena (loan)	18	(5)
2019	Padova	6	(0)
2019–2021	Olbia	40	(7)
2021–2022	Seregno	35	(10)
2022–2023	AlbinoLeffe	34	(12)
2023–2024	Trapani	25	(16)
2024–2025	Monastir		
Total		419	(117)
- * Club domestic league appearances and goals

Andrea Salvatore Cocco (born 8 April 1986) is an Italian former professional footballer who plays as a forward.

== Career ==
=== Cagliari ===
Cocco made his Serie A debut on 21 December 2005 for Cagliari in a 1–0 defeat away to Parma F.C. On 31 January 2007, he left for Venezia. and on 31 August 2007 for Pistoiese.

Cocco was sold to Rovigo in a co-ownership deal in August 2008. In June 2009 Cagliari bought Cocco and Andrea Peana (from Triestina) back, but sold them to Alghero immediately in co-ownership deals (later Simone Aresti also joined), where Cocco also met ex-team-mate Alessio Cossu, Nicola Lai and Enrico Cotza (in January). In June 2010, few week before the bankrupt of Alghero, Cagliari bought back Cocco and Aresti for €500.

=== AlbinoLeffe ===
Few days after Cagliari signed Gabriele Perico and Simon Laner from AlbinoLeffe in temporary deals for €750,000 (€375,000 each), Cocco was sold to AlbinoLeffe in co-ownership deal for €50,000 in a three-year deal, making Cagliari only paid AlbinoLeffe €700,000 in cash. In June 2011 Cagliari bought back Cocco for €150,000, as well as bought Perico in a co-ownership deal for €375,000, making Cagliari paid AlbinoLeffe €500,000 cash that summer.

On 4 July 2011, Cocco returned to AlbinoLeffe in a temporary deal with option to sign outright for €200,000. Despite the club relegated, the option was excised in a four-year contract. On the same day Perico was acquired outright for another €200,000, thus the two transfer fees were canceled each other. However, Cocco was sold by AlbinoLeffe in the same summer.

=== Verona and loans ===
On 30 July 2012, Cocco signed for Hellas Verona in a co-ownership deal with AlbinoLeffe, for €290,000 fee in a three-year contract. In June 2013 the co-ownership deal was renewed.

After a one-year stint with Verona in August 2013, he joined Reggina on a loan deal. On 29 January 2014, he was again loaned to Portuguese Segunda Liga side Beira-Mar.

In June 2014 Verona acquired Cocco and Laner outright from AlbinoLeffe for €500 each, with Simone Calvano returned to Verona also for €500.

=== Vicenza ===
He moved to Vicenza on 8 August 2014 in a two-year contract on a free transfer. He missed few weeks of 2015–16 Serie B due to an injury in pre-season.

=== Pescara and loans ===
On 31 August 2015, Cocco signed for fellow Serie B club Pescara on a reported three-year contract for a transfer fee of €600,000. On 3 August 2016, Cocco was loaned to fellow Serie B club Frosinone (with option to buy), which the team was relegated from Serie A. After scoring just 1 league goal for the Lazio-based club, Cocco was loaned to another Serie B team Cesena on 16 January 2017. He wore number 11 shirt for his new team. On 31 January 2019, he was released from his Pescara contract by mutual consent.

=== Padova ===
On 27 February 2019, he signed with Padova.

=== Olbia ===
On 19 November 2019, he signed a contract with Olbia until 30 June 2021.

=== Seregno ===
On 20 August 2021, he joined Serie C club Seregno.

=== Return to AlbinoLeffe ===
On 9 August 2022, Cocco returned to AlbinoLeffe.

=== Trapani ===
On 27 July 2023, Cocco signed for Serie D club Trapani.
