= Roberto Ranieri =

Italian footballer (born 1997)

Personal information
- Date of birth: 28 April 1997 (age 29)
- Place of birth: Treviglio, Italy
- Height: 1.71 m (5 ft 7 1/2 in)
- Position: Midfielder

Team information
- Current team: Novara
- Number: 4

Youth career
- –2015: Atalanta

Senior career*
Years	Team	Apps	(Gls)
2015–2019	Atalanta	0	(0)
2016–2017	→ Cosenza (loan)	30	(0)
2017–2018	→ Alessandria (loan)	21	(0)
2018–2019	→ Teramo (loan)	15	(2)
2019	→ Imolese (loan)	11	(0)
2019–2022	Renate	94	(0)
2022–	Novara	122	(4)
- * Club domestic league appearances and goals as of 30 April 2026

Roberto Ranieri (born 28 April 1997) is an Italian footballer who plays as a midfielder for Serie C Group A club Novara.

== Career ==
=== Atalanta ===
Born in Treviglio, Ranieri was a youth exponent of Atalanta.

==== Loan to Cosenza ====
On 14 July 2016, Ranieri was signed by Serie C side Cosenza on a season-long loan deal. On 31 July he made his debut for Cosenza in a 1–0 home win over Nerostellati Frattese in the first round of Coppa Italia, he was replaced by Andrea Bilotta in the 87th minute. On 14 September he made his Serie C debut for Cosenza as a substitute replacing Giorgio Capece in the 63rd minute of a 3–0 home win over Melfi. On 18 September, Ranieri played his first match in Serie C as a starter, a 2–0 home win over Vibonese, he was replaced by Giorgio Capece in the 55th minute. On 16 October he played his first entire match for Cosenza, a 2–1 home win over Paganese. Ranieri ended his season-long loan to Cosenza with 36 appearances and 4 assists.

==== Loan to Alessandria ====
On 9 July 2017, Ranieri was loaned to Serie C club Alessandria on a season-long loan deal. On 6 August he made his debut for Alessandria as a substitute replacing Riccardo Cazzola in the 86th minute of a 2–1 away defeat against Salernitana in the second round of Coppa Italia. On 27 August he made his Serie C debut for Alessandria as a substitute replacing Riccardo Cazzola in the 77th minute of a 1–1 away draw against Pontedera. On 24 September, Ranieri played his first match as a starter for Alessandria in Serie C, a 0–0 away draw against Robur Siena, he was replaced by Alessandro Gazzi in the 72nd minute. On 1 October he played his first entire match for Alessandria, a 1–0 home defeat against Arezzo. Ranieri ended his loan to Alessandria with 23 appearances.

==== Loan to Teramo and Imolese ====
On 23 July 2018, Ranieri was signed by Serie C club Teramo on a season-long loan deal. On 17 September he made his Serie C debut for the club in a 1–0 away defeat against Südtirol, he was replaced by Lorenzo De Grazia in the 65th minute. One week later, on 23 September he played his first entire match for Teramo, a 0–0 home draw against Sambenedettese. On 7 October, Ranieri scored his first professional goal in the 89th minute of a 3–1 away defeat against FeralpiSalò and one week later, on 13 October, he scored his second consecutive goal in the 9th minute of a 1–1 away draw against Rimini. In January 2019, Ranieri returned to Atalanta leaving Teramo with 15 appearances, 2 goals and 1 assist.

On 31 January 2019, Ranieri was loaned to Serie C side Imolese on a 6-month loan deal. On 23 February he made his debut for Imolese as a starter in a 2–0 home win over Vis Pesaro, he was replaced in the 54th minute by Saber Hraiech. Ranieri ended his 6-month loan with 12 appearances, including only 5 as a starter.

=== Renate ===
On 7 August 2019, Ranieri joined to Serie C club Renate on an undisclosed fee and he signed a 1-year contract with an option for the second year. On 25 August he made his debut for the club as a starter in a 2–0 away win over Giana Erminio, he was replaced by Alessio Militari after 80 minutes. Four weeks later, on 22 September he played his first entire match for the club, a 2–0 home win over Olbia. He became Renate's first-choice early in the season.

=== Novara ===
On 8 July 2022, he moved to Serie C club Novara.

== Career statistics ==
=== Club ===
As of match played 12 May 2022

Club	Season	League			Cup		Europe		Other		Total	
Club	Season	League	Apps	Goals	Apps	Goals	Apps	Goals	Apps	Goals	Apps	Goals
Cosenza (loan)	2016–17	Serie C	30	0	1	0	—		5 (Note: All appearance(s) in Serie C play-off.)	0	36	0
Alessandria (loan)	2017–18	Serie C	21	0	1	0	—		1	0	23	0
Teramo (loan)	2018–19	Serie C	15	2	0	0	—		—		15	2
Imolese (loan)	2018–19	Serie C	11	0	—		—		1	0	12	0
Renate	2019–20	Serie C	27	0	0	0	—		1	0	28	0
Renate	2020–21	Serie C	35	0	2	0	—		4	0	41	0
Renate	2021–22	Serie C	32	0	0	0	—		2	0	34	0
Renate	Total		94	0	2	0	—		7	0	103	2
Career total			171	2	4	0	—		14	0	189	2
