= Alessio Cossu =

Italian footballer (born 1986)

Personal information
- Date of birth: 14 January 1986 (age 40)
- Place of birth: Cagliari, Italy
- Height: 1.70 m (5 ft 7 in)
- Positions: Right midfielder; forward

Youth career
- Cagliari

Senior career*
Years	Team	Apps	(Gls)
2006–2007	Ravenna	2	(0)
2007–2008	Manfredonia	16	(1)
2008	→ Monopoli (loan)	9	(1)
2008–2009	San Marino	11	(0)
2009–2010	Alghero	25	(1)
- * Club domestic league appearances and goals

Alessio Cossu (born 14 January 1986) is an Italian footballer who plays as a midfielder or forward. He played in Serie C1 for Ravenna and Manfredonia.

== Career ==
Born in Cagliari, Sardinia, Cossu was sold to Serie C1 side Ravenna in a co-ownership deal. In June 2007, Cagliari gave their remaining registration rights to Ravenna after Cossu played twice for his new club.

He was sold to Serie C1 side Manfredonia in another co-ownership deal as Ravenna promoted to Serie B. He joined Monopoli in mid-season.

In June 2008, Manfredonia got the remaining registration rights.

In August 2008, he swapped the club with Francesco Indirli and in January 2009 returned to Sardinia for Alghero, rejoining former team-mate Roberto Puddu.

In the 2009–10 season, his former Cagliari youth team team-mate Andrea Cocco, Andrea Peana, Simone Aresti, Nicola Lai, and Enrico Cotza (in January) joined him at Alghero.

== Honours ==
=== Club ===
Ravenna

- Serie C1/B: 2006–07
