= Sardinian Cup =

Football knock-out cup competition

The Sardinian Cup, known as Coppa Italia Dilettanti Sardegna, or Coppa Sardegna in Italian, is an association football knock-out cup competition run by the Sardinian Committee of the Federazione Italiana Giuoco Calcio (FIGC Sardinia). Established in 1991–1992, it allows the winner to compete in the national phase of the Coppa Italia Dilettanti.

== Formula ==
From its inception to the 2005–2006 season, all 16 teams from the Eccellenza and 32 from the Promozione participated in the cup. Since the following season, the two divisions have played a separate cup. The winners face each other in the Sardinian Supercup.

== Past winners ==
Correct as of January 2023.

| Season | Winners | Score | Runners–up | Place |
|---|---|---|---|---|
| 1991-1992 | Decimoputzu | 3–2 | Quartu | Ussana |
| 1992-1993 | Carloforte | 1–0 (a.e.t.) | Ariete Solanas | Serramanna |
| 1993-1994 | Carloforte | 2–1 (a.e.t.) | San Sperate | Arbus |
| 1994-1995 | Bittese | 1–0 | Pula | Oristano |
| 1995-1996 | Atletico Elmas | 5–3 | Bittese | Oristano |
| 1996-1997 | Sant'Antioco | 3–1 (a.e.t.) | Corrasi Oliena | Terralba |
| 1997-1998 | Villacidrese | 1–0 (a.e.t.) | Esperia Sorso | Ghilarza |
| 1998-1999 | Corrasi Oliena | 1–0 (a.e.t.) | Pula | Oristano |
| 1999-2000 | Arbus | 1–0 | Corrasi Oliena | Oristano |
| 2000-2001 | Atletico Elmas | 2-1 | Thiesi | Oristano |
| 2001-2002 | Dolianova | 1–0 (a.e.t.) | Arzachena | Ghilarza |
| 2002-2003 | Arbus | 2-0 | Castelsardo | Nuoro |
| 2003-2004 | Tempio | 5-0 | Nuorese | Ittiri |
| 2004-2005 | Tavolara | 2-0 | Tharros | Ghilarza |
| 2005-2006 | Tavolara | 4-2 (p.) | Samassi | Ghilarza |
| 2006-2007 | Castelsardo | 3-2 | Quartu 2000 | Terralba |
| 2007-2008 | Terralba | 2-1 | Taloro Gavoi | Macomer |
| 2008-2009 | Porto Torres | 8-7 (p.) | Sanluri | Ghilarza |
| 2009-2010 | Porto Torres | 5-4 (p.) | Carbonia | Nuoro |
| 2010-2011 | Taloro Gavoi | 5-3 | Tortolì | Dorgali |
| 2011-2012 | Torres | 2-1 | Taloro Gavoi | Macomer |
| 2012-2013 | Muravera | 2-0 | Olbia | Santa Giusta |
| 2013-2014 | Porto Corallo | 1-0 | Nuorese | Oristano |
| 2014-2015 | Lanusei | 2-1 (a.e.t.) | Castelsardo | Macomer |
| 2015-2016 | Ghilarza | 2-1 | Taloro Gavoi | Oristano |
| 2016-2017 | Tortolì | 2-1 | Atletico Uri | Oristano |
| 2017-2018 | Tonara | 1-0 | Atletico Uri | Oristano |
| 2018-2019 | Nuorese | 1-0 | Muravera | Monastir |
| 2019-2020 | Carbonia | 1-0 | Atletico Uri | Oristano |
2020-2021
| 2021-2022 | Ossese | 2-0 | Castiadas | Oristano |
| 2022-2023 | Budoni | 2-2 (8-7 (p.)) | Carbonia | Abbasanta |
| 2023-2024 | Ossese | 1-0 | Sant'Elena | Abbasanta |
| 2024-2025 | Ossese | 1-0 | Villasimius | Oristano |

Clubs in italics played in Promozione.
