= Mancosu =

Mancosu is a surname. Notable people with the surname include:

- Marcello Mancosu (born 1992), Italian footballer
- Marco Mancosu (born 1988), Italian footballer
- Matteo Mancosu (born 1984), Italian footballer, brother of Marco and Marcello

== See also ==
- Mancuso
