= Vincent Taua =

New Caledonian footballer (born 1978)

Personal information
- Date of birth: 1 November 1978 (age 47)
- Place of birth: New Caledonia
- Position: Forward

Team information
- Current team: Campli

Senior career*
Years	Team	Apps	(Gls)
–2001	Bastia B		
2001	Cavese	10	(1)
2002	Nocerina	2	(0)
2002–2003	Isernia		
2003–2006	Teramo	65	(18)
2006–2007	Benevento	20	(3)
2007	Paganese	14	(0)
2008	Nuorese	8	(1)
2008–2009	Vibonese	20	(2)
2009–2010	Teramo		
2010–2011	Isernia		
2012–2014	Valdiano		
2014–2015	Piano della Lente		
2016	Castelnuovo Vomano		
2017–2018	Pro Nepezzano		
2018–2019	Alba Montaurei		
2019–2020	Pro Nepezzano		
2020–	Campli		
- * Club domestic league appearances and goals

Vincent Taua (born 1 November 1978) is a New Caledonian footballer who plays as a attacker for Campli. Besides France, he has played in Italy.

== Career ==
Taua started his career with French fifth tier side Bastia B. In 2001, Taua signed for Cavese in the Italian third tier, where he made 10 league appearances and scored 1 goal. In 2002, he signed for Italian fourth tier club Isernia.

In 2003, Taua signed for Teramo in the Italian third tier. In 2009, he returned to Italian fifth tier team Teramo. In 2010, he signed for Isernia. In 2014, he signed for Piano della Lente in the Italian sixth tier. In 2020, Taua signed for Italian seventh tier outfit Campli.

== Personal life ==
He is the cousin of France international Christian Karembeu.
