= Enrico Cotza =

Italian footballer (born 1988)

Personal information
- Date of birth: 3 July 1988 (age 38)
- Place of birth: Cagliari, Italy
- Height: 1.74 m (5 ft 8 1/2 in)
- Position: Midfielder

Youth career
- Cagliari

Senior career*
Years	Team	Apps	(Gls)
2007–2010	Cagliari	4	(0)
2008–2009	→ Foligno (loan)	20	(0)
2010	→ Alghero (loan)	2	(0)
2010–2011	Villacidrese	28	(0)
- * Club domestic league appearances and goals as of 03:35, 13 January 2010 (UTC)

Enrico Cotza (born 3 July 1988) is an Italian footballer who plays as a midfielder.

== Career ==
Cotza has made four senior appearances for Cagliari so far in his career; his Serie A debut being on the receiving end of a 5–1 drubbing against Fiorentina in December 2007.

On 1 September 2008, Cotza joined Foligno in third-tier Prima Divisione on loan for the remainder of the 2008-09 season.

On 1 February 2010 he was loaned to Alghero where he met ex-teammates Alessio Cossu, Andrea Cocco, Andrea Peana and Simone Aresti. In June 2010 the club signed him to a co-ownership deal. After the club was expelled from the professional league, he joined Villacidrese in a co-ownership deal.
