= Nicola Lai =

Italian footballer

Personal information
- Full name: Nicola Lai
- Date of birth: 17 January 1986 (age 40)
- Place of birth: Cagliari, Italy
- Height: 1.70 m (5 ft 7 in)
- Position: Left midfielder

Youth career
- Cagliari

Senior career*
Years	Team	Apps	(Gls)
2006–2007	Rieti	18	(2)
2007–2008	Torres	2	(0)
2009	Algero	1	(0)
Total		21	(2)
- * Club domestic league appearances and goals

Nicola Lai (born 17 January 1986) is an Italian footballer who plays as a midfielder.

== Career ==
Born in Cagliari, Sardinia, Lai was sold to Rieti in co-ownership deal. In June 2007, Cagliari decided to give up the remain registration rights to Rieti. In July 2007, he joined Sardinian side Torres.

He then played for non-professional side Muravera for a season (at league Promozione), and in 2009-10 season signed for Algero, which the club had former Cagliari team-mate Alessio Cossu, Andrea Cocco, Andrea Peana and Simone Aresti.

But in November 2009, he was released along with Massimiliano Farrugia.
