= Gaetano Poziello =

Italian footballer (born 1975)

Personal information
- Date of birth: 28 March 1975 (age 51)
- Place of birth: Marcianise, Italy
- Height: 1.79 m (5 ft 10 in)
- Position: Striker

Senior career*
Years	Team	Apps	(Gls)
1993–1994	Real Marcianise		(0)
1994–1995	Barletta	6	(0)
1995–1996	Casertana	23	(4)
1996–1997	Albanova	9	(0)
1997–1998	Narnese	25	(3)
1998–1999	Campobasso	27	(3)
1999–2000	Bojano	19	(7)
2000–2001	Latina	14	(1)
2001–2002	Real Marcianise	28	(20)
2002–2003	Salernitana	8	(0)
2003	Gladiator	13	(8)
2003–2004	Benevento	15	(2)
2004	Isernia	6	(1)
2004–2010	Real Marcianise	155	(42)
2010	Turris	12	(3)
2010–2012	Luco Canistro	23	(6)
2019–2021	Aurora Alto Casertano		(20)
2021–2022	Forza e Coraggio		(0)
Total		388+	(120)
- * Club domestic league appearances and goals

Gaetano Poziello (born 28 March 1975) is an Italian former professional footballer who played as a striker.

== Career ==
Over the course of his career, Poziello played for numerous clubs across southern Italy. He had a brief stint in Serie B with Salernitana under the management of Zdeněk Zeman, making eight appearances.

Poziello is best remembered for his role at Real Marcianise, the club of his hometown, where he played a leading part in the team's ascent from Serie D to Serie C1 between 2004 and 2010. In addition to his time at Real Marcianise, Poziello also played in Serie C1 with Benevento and Barletta, in Serie C2 with Albanova, Gladiator, and Isernia, and in Serie D with clubs such as Campobasso, Narnese, Bojano, Latina, Turris, and Luco Canistro.

== Legal issues ==
On 1 October 2016, Poziello was arrested following an incident in which he, then 41 years old and residing in San Marco Evangelista (Province of Caserta), was reported for disturbing customers at a local bar in Marcianise. Upon the arrival of law enforcement, he reportedly reacted aggressively, damaging a police vehicle and physically assaulting the officers. He was subsequently detained and held pending a fast-track judicial proceeding.
