= List of SEF Torres 1903 seasons =

Italian football club seasons

This is a list of S.E.F. Torres 1903 seasons

== League and cup history ==
Season	Div.	Pos.	Pl.	W	D	L	GS	GA	P	Domestic Cup	Other	Notes
1999–00	Serie C2	1/18	34	19	10	5	56	30	67			Promoted
2000–01	Serie C1	7/18	34	14	11	9	55	45	53			
2001–02	Serie C1	11/18	34	11	10	13	41	35	43			
2002–03	Serie C1	12/18	38	9	11	14	21	34	37			
2003–04	Serie C1	13/18	36	9	11	14	21	28	38			
2004–05	Serie C1	13/19	36	10	12	14	36	43	42			
2005–06	Serie C1	3/18	34	12	17	5	44	32	53			
2006–07	Serie C2	12/18	34	10	12	12	33	39	40			
2007–08	Serie C2	13/18	34	13	11	10	42	34	42			
2008–09	Serie E	2/18	30	17	6	7	55	30	57			
2009–10	Serie E	10/18	34	10	13	11	41	36	43			
2010–11	Serie E	2/18	34	17	13	4	59	30	64			
2011–12	Serie E	1/18	34	28	3	3	69	17	87			Promoted
2012–13	Serie D	1/18	34	18	14	2	62	30	68			Promoted
2013–14	Serie C2	12/18	34	12	11	11	40	44	47			
2014–15	Serie C2	20/20	38	11	14	13	35	38	47			Relegated
2015–16	Serie D	3/18	34	19	9	6	64	28	62			
2016–17	Serie D	16/18	34	6	10	18	23	58	23			Relegated
2017–18	Serie E	2/16	30	15	9	6	49	22	54			Promoted
2018–19	Serie D	15/20	38	12	4	22	35	59	40			
2019–20	Serie D	3/18	26	14	9	3	44	25	51			
2020–21	Serie D	15/20	34	8	10	16	31	48	34			
2021–22	Serie D									Finalist		
