= Nuorese =

Nuorese may refer to:

- A dialect of the Sardinian language
- F.C. Nuorese Calcio, a football (soccer) team from Nuoro

== See also ==
- Nuoro
