= Matteo Mancosu =

Italian footballer

Personal information
- Date of birth: 22 December 1984 (age 41)
- Place of birth: Cagliari, Italy
- Height: 1.82 m (6 ft 0 in)
- Position: Forward

Youth career
- 2000–2001: Scuola Calcio Johannes

Senior career*
Years	Team	Apps	(Gls)
2001–2004	Atletico Calcio	73	(7)
2004–2006	Nuorese	54	(20)
2006–2010	Villacidrese	113	(46)
2010–2011	Latina	20	(5)
2011–2012	Vigor Lamezia	37	(20)
2012–2015	Trapani	88	(55)
2015–2016	Bologna	26	(1)
2016	→ Carpi (loan)	15	(1)
2016–2018	Montreal Impact	61	(12)
2019–2021	Virtus Entella	77	(17)
- * Club domestic league appearances and goals

Matteo Mancosu (born 22 December 1984) is an Italian former professional footballer who played as a forward. A right-footed player, although he was usually deployed in the centre as a main striker, he was also capable of playing as a winger on either flank.

== Career ==
=== Atletico Elmas and Atletico Calcio ===
Born in Cagliari, Sardinia, Mancosu played in the youth team of the Scuola Calcio Johannes of Cagliari, and while he was not able to pass any of several trials with Cagliari, the main Sardinian football team, he managed to break into the squad of the Atletico Elmas in Serie D. Mancosu played 4 seasons in Serie D with Atletico Elmas, which was renamed Atletico Calcio in 2002, scoring 7 goals in 73 matches.

=== Nuorese ===
Mancosu moved down in Eccellenza in November 2004, to play with Nuorese. In his first year, he contributed to the promotion of the Sardinian club scoring 14 goals in 31 matches. He also played for Nuorese in Serie D the next season, scoring 6 goals in 23 matches.

=== Villacidrese ===
Mancosu moved to another Sardinian team in 2006. He will play the next 4 seasons for Villacidrese. In his first three seasons there, in 91 matches in Serie D Mancosu scored 43 goals, 18 of whose while leading them to promotion in 2008–09. Mancosu played the fourth and final season for Villacidrese in Seconda Divisione, scoring 7 goals in 22 matches.

=== Latina ===
Mancosu moved to his first team outside Sardinia only in 2010–11, at the age of 25. He played for one season for Latina in Seconda Divisione, scoring 5 goals in 20 matches.

=== Vigor Lamezia ===
Mancosu moved then to Vigor Lamezia in 2011–12. He played for the Calabrian side only that season, in Seconda Divisione, and he went to score 20 goals in 37 matches, a career best.

=== Trapani ===
Mancosu finally got the chance to debut in Prima Divisione when he joined Trapani in the summer of 2012. Specifically selected to improve a squad that had been very close to the promotion the previous year, Mancosu lead the Sicilian side to a historic first promotion in Serie B scoring 15 times in 29 matches. Mancosu has been leading the forward line of Trapani also during the 2013–14 Serie B season, scoring 19 goals in the first 27 matches, a record for a rookie. He finished the season as the top-scorer in Serie B with 26 goals in 40 appearances.

=== Bologna ===
On 26 January 2015, Mancosu was acquired by Bologna for €1.1 million in a 2 1/2-year contract. On 22 August 2015, he made his Serie A debut on the opening fixture of the 2015–16 Serie A season, a 2–1 defeat against Lazio at the age of 30, scoring his first goal in Serie A in the same match.

==== Loans to Carpi ====
On 12 January 2016, he was loaned out by Bologna to Carpi. Carpi also had a buy option and an obligation to purchase his contract outright if Carpi was not relegated. He scored his first goal for the team on his club debut, on 13 January, in a 2–1 away defeat to Milan in the quarter-finals of the Coppa Italia. At the end of season Mancosu returned to Bologna, as the conditional obligation was not achieved nor the option was activated.

=== Montreal Impact ===
On 7 July 2016, Mancosu was sent on loan once again, to Canadian side Montreal Impact in Major League Soccer on a one-year loan. The club was also owned by Joey Saputo, chairman of Bologna. Mancosu made his debut for the club coming on as a substitute in a 3–1 home defeat to New York City F.C. on 17 July.

On 2 March 2017, it was announced that Mancosu had signed a two-year deal with Montreal Impact.

=== Virtus Entella ===
Mancosu joined Virtus Entella of the Italian Serie C on 8 January 2019.

== Personal life ==
Mancosu has two younger brothers, Marco and Marcello, who are also footballers.

== Honours ==
Individual

- Serie B top scorer: 2013–14
