= SS Tavolara Calcio =

Italian association football club

Tavolara
- Full name: Associazione Sportiva Dilettantistica Tavolara Calcio 1954
- Nickname: I Verdi (The Greens)
- Founded: 31 May 1954; 72 years ago as, Gruppo Sportivo Tavolara; 1956; 70 years ago as, Società Sportiva Tavolara Calcio; 2019; 7 years ago as, Associazione Sportiva Dilettantistica Tavolara Calcio 1954 (refounded)
- Ground: Stadio Geovillage, Olbia, Italy
- Chairman: Damiano Brundu
- Manager: Michele Tamponi
- League: Prima Categoria
- 2010–11: Serie D/G, 17th (relegated)
Home colours	Away colours

Associazione Sportiva Dilettantistica Tavolara Calcio, also known as Tavolara, is an amateur football team from the Sardinian city of Olbia. It currently plays in Prima Categoria.

== History ==
=== Beginnings ===
The birth of Tavolara is linked to the Catholic church and the Italian Sports Centre (Centro Sportivo Italiano, CSI), which, on the tenth anniversary of its foundation, invited the local dioceses to create new sports groups. Through the parish priest of the San Paolo's Church, the city's main church, and Azione Cattolica, a group of young people founded the Gruppo Sportivo Tavolara in Piazza Santa Croce in 1954. The first president was Pinuccio Deiana, who, after a few years in the CSI championships, registered the newly formed club with the FIGC in 1956. In 1959, beating the highly rated Cagliari in the final, Tavolara won the regional junior championship, playing the national finals in Carrara, where they met teams such as Juventus, Inter, and Fiorentina.

=== Ups and downs ===
In the 1959–1960 season, entered the Prima Categoria, then the first tier of Sardinian football, Tavolara experienced its first relegation to the Seconda Categoria. After a quick ascent, alternating mid-table championships between the three first tiers of island football, the club won its first championship, the group C of the Seconda Categoria (then second tier), in 1977-1978 and was promoted to the newly created Promozione. It was, however, necessary to have a playoff between Tavolara and Berchidda, both of which came first, a playoff played on 4 June 1978 in Calangianus and ended 0–0 after extra time. The coin toss favored Tavolara.

After winning the championship, Tavolara was a regular presence in Promozione, then the highest regional tier, throughout the 1980s, with its best finish being fifth place in the 1989–1990 season.

The Promozione, which at the time was split into the North and South groups, became the second regional tier after the league's reform. Thirteen teams from both groups were admitted to the new Eccellenza, plus the Sardinians clubs relegated from Serie D. Tavolara was admitted to the new league after winning two play-offs. The first was against Macomer 4–2 to determine the 7th-ranked team in Group B. The second was against Sguotti Carbonia 2–1, who also finished 7th in group A.

Tavolara continued in Eccellenza for five seasons, only to relegate to Promozione (then the second regional tier) in the 1995–1996 season and return the following year as runners-up in Group B.

=== The golden age ===
After two seasons, finished mid-table in the 1999-2000 campaign Tavolara won the Eccellenza, obtaining the first Sardinian championship title in its history and being promoted to Serie D, the fifth tier of Italian football. After a good seventh place in the 2000–2001 season, the club was relegated the following year, finishing 17th in the B group.

The following seasons played at the highest regional tier are full of achievements, representing, in fact, Tavolara's golden age. In 2002-2003 it achieved the sixth-place finish, reaching the semi-finals of the Sardinian Cup. The following season it was eliminated in the Sardinian Cup second round but finished runner-up, playing the playoff in which won the first round with Bastia Umbra (1–0; 1–3) but lost in the second round with Forcoli (2–0; 2–4). Despite a disappointing ninth-place finish in the 2004–2005 season, Tavolara won the first Sardinian Cup in its history, beating Tharros 2–0 in Ghilarza in the final. The following season, again in Ghilarza, it repeated the previous year's success by beating Samassi (4-2 extra-time) and winning its second Sardinian Cup. On 26 January 2006, they beat Silanus (6–3) and won for the first time the Coppa Sant'Antonio, the 30th edition of a renowned Sardinian-friendly trophy. On May 27, 2006, it was awarded the "Sports Merit Award" (Premio di Benemerenza Sportiva) in Rome by the FIGC as a sports club with more than 50 years of activity. In the league, it will reach an excellent third place and improve the following season with the victory of the second Eccellenza and the consequent promotion to Serie D. In the Sardinian Cup, it will instead reach the semi-finals. The following season Tavolara reached third place, losing in the play-off against Alghero (1–2). It did even better the following year in being runner-up and gaining a new qualification to the play-off, lost this time with Arzachena (1–2).

=== Disappearance and revival ===
Finishing runner-up in the 2009–2010 season guaranteed qualification for the Coppa Italia the following season, which, however, they decided to withdraw from. The season ended with an 11th-place finish. In the 2010–2011 season, the team farewelled the Serie D, finishing 17th in the table and relegated to the Eccellenza after losing the play-out against Sanluri (1-2 extra time). The 2011-2012 Eccellenza, which ended in 9th place, will be the last played by the club in the highest regional tier, and at the end of the season, will disappear to be promptly re-founded as Gruppo Sportivo Tavolara 1954 and enrolled in the Terza Categoria in the following season, ended in 12th place.

In the 2013–2014 season, Tavolara began the campaign well, but a series of negative results led it to finish runner-up, which, however, guaranteed repechage to the fourth tier of regional football, the Seconda Categoria, also finishing runner-up, which, again, guaranteed repechage to the Prima Categoria where, in the 2015–2016 season, it ended in fifth place.

In 2016–2017, the club did not join the competition and, in fact, disappeared.

The absence from the fields lasted until the 2019–2020 season when, in September 2019, the club was reconstituted as Associazione Sportiva Dilettantistica Tavolara Calcio and enrolled in the group D of Terza Categoria (Olbia-Tempio) finishing eighth. Another stop was the following season due to the interruption of the amateur leagues due to the COVID-19 pandemic. In 2021–2022, still in Terza Categoria, they finished in seventh place.

The 2022–2023 season saw Tavolara's winning debut, beating Audax Padru 1–2 in group G of the Terza Categoria, finishing as a runners-up.

In the 2025–26 season, Tavolara were crowned champions of group H of the Seconda Categoria, earning promotion to Prima Categoria.

== Club badge and colors ==
The name chosen by the group of young people who founded the club was Tavolara, the island symbol of the city of Olbia. Since its foundation, the colors representing the club have been green and white because they refer, respectively, to the island's vegetation and to the color of the city's other leading club, Olbia, whose colors are white.

Tavolara has had three badges in its history, all with the island's image in the foreground. When the club was called Gruppo Sportivo Tavolara and, later, Società Sportiva Tavolara, the foundation date, 1954, was also added, as well as another city symbol, the stylized ship. The SS Tavolara put the red and blue to the traditional colors of green and white and a stylized eagle. The current Associazione Sportiva Dilettantistica Tavolara has eliminated both the foundation date and the stylized ship.

== Stadium ==
Throughout its history, Tavolara has played in various stadiums in the city, including the main Olbia stadium, Stadio Bruno Nespoli, Stadio Angelo Caocci, Stadio Oddone, and, currently, the Geovillage.

== Honours ==
Tavolara's list of honours include the following.

=== National titles ===
- Serie D (Tier 5):
  - Runners-up (1): 2008–09 Group G
  - Third-place (1): 2007–08 Group G

=== Sardinian titles ===
==== Leagues ====
- Eccellenza (Tier 1):
  - Winners (2): 1999–00, 2006–07
  - Runners-up (1): 2003–04
  - Third-place (1): 2005–06
- Prima Categoria / Promozione (Tier 2):
  - Winners (1): 1977–78 Group C
  - Runners-up (1): 1996–97 Group B
- Seconda Categoria (Tier 3):
  - Winners (1): 1976-77 Group G
- Seconda Categoria (Tier 4):
  - Winners (1): 2025-26 Group H
  - Runners-up (1): 2014–15 Group G
- Terza Categoria (Tier 5):
  - Runners-up (2): 2013–14 Group C, 2022-23 Group G

==== Cups ====
- Sardinian Cup:
  - Winners (2): 2004–05, 2005–06
  - Semi-final (2): 2002–03, 2006–07

=== Unofficial ===
- Coppa Sant'Antonio:
  - Winners (1): 2005–06

== List of seasons ==
=== Season-by-season ===
Season	Fed.	Level	League	Pos.	Cup
1955–56	SRD				-
1956–57	SRD				-
1957–58	SRD				-
1958–59	SRD				-
1959–60	SRD	I	Prima Categoria	13	-
1960–61	SRD				-
1961–62	SRD				-
1962–63	SRD	I	Prima Categoria Group A	7	-
1963–64	SRD	I	Prima Categoria Group A	8	-
1964–65	SRD	I	Prima Categoria Group A	8	-
1965–66	SRD	I	Prima Categoria Group A	7	-
1966–67	SRD	I	Prima Categoria Group B	8	-
1967–68	SRD	I	Prima Categoria Group B	13	-
1968–69	SRD	I	Prima Categoria Group B	11	-
1969–70	SRD	II	Prima Categoria Group Nord		-
1970–71	SRD				-
1971–72	SRD	II	Prima Categoria Group Nord	9	-
1972–73	SRD	II	Prima Categoria Group Nord	13	-
1973–74	SRD	II	Prima Categoria Group Nord	17	-
1974–75	SRD	III	Seconda Categoria Group E	13	-
1975–76	SRD	III	Seconda Categoria Group D	10	-
1976–77	SRD	III	Seconda Categoria Group G	1	-
1977–78	SRD	II	Prima Categoria Group C	1	-
1978–79	SRD	I	Promozione Group B	13	-
1979–80	SRD	I	Promozione Group B	7	-
1980–81	SRD	I	Promozione Group B	9	-
1981–82	SRD	I	Promozione Group B	7	
1982–83	SRD	I	Promozione Group B	13	
1983–84	SRD	I	Promozione Group B	11	
1984–85	SRD	I	Promozione Group B	13	
1985–86	SRD	I	Promozione Group B	10	
1986–87	SRD	I	Promozione Group B	12	
1987–88	SRD	I	Promozione Group B	6	
1988–89	SRD	I	Promozione Group B	6	
1989–90	SRD	I	Promozione Group B	5	
1990–91	SRD	I	Promozione Group B	7	
1991–92	SRD	I	Eccellenza	9	
1992–93	SRD	I	Eccellenza	12	
1993–94	SRD	I	Eccellenza	10	
1994–95	SRD	I	Eccellenza	11	
1995–96	SRD	I	Eccellenza	15	
1996–97	SRD	I	Promozione Group B	2	
1997–98	SRD	I	Eccellenza	13	
1998–99	SRD	I	Eccellenza	9	
1999–00	SRD	I	Eccellenza	1	
2000–01	ITA	5	Serie D Group G	7	R1
2001–02	ITA	5	Serie D Group B	17	R1
2002–03	SRD	I	Eccellenza	6	SF
2003–04	SRD	I	Eccellenza	2	R2
2004–05	SRD	I	Eccellenza	9	1
2005–06	SRD	I	Eccellenza	3	1
2006–07	SRD	I	Eccellenza	1	SF
2007–08	ITA	5	Serie D Group G	3	R3
2008–09	ITA	5	Serie D Group G	2	R2
2009–10	ITA	5	Serie D Group G	11	PR
2010–11	ITA	5	Serie D Group G	17	PR
2011–12	SRD	I	Eccellenza	9	R2
2012–13	SRD	V	Terza Categoria Group C	12	-
2013–14	SRD	V	Terza Categoria Group C	2	-
2014–15	SRD	IV	Seconda Categoria Group G	2	-
2015–16	SRD	III	Prima Categoria Group D	5	-
2016–17	-	-	-	-	-
2017–18	-	-	-	-	-
2018–19	-	-	-	-	-
2019–20	SRD	V	Terza Categoria Group D	8	-
2020–21	SRD	V	Terza Categoria Group D	-	-
2021–22	SRD	V	Terza Categoria Group D	7	-
2022–23	SRD	V	Terza Categoria Group G	2	-
2023–24	SRD	IV	Seconda Categoria Group F	8	-
2024–25	SRD	IV	Seconda Categoria Group H	5	-
2025–26	SRD	IV	Seconda Categoria Group H	1	-

== Rivalries ==
Tavolara historically represents the city's second team, behind the more distinguished Olbia. The two clubs have no real rivalry, mainly due to their participation in different leagues. Olbia has the advantage in direct clashes (played in the leagues, Coppa Italia Dilettanti, Sardinian Cup, and a friendly), having won 7 times against Tavolara's 2. There are 4 draws (although Olbia won the final of the Torneo San Simplicio at penalties), for a total of 13 matches between the two clubs. The match generally receives the name "Derby di Olbia."

=== List of derbies ===
Season	Num.	Tier	Home	Res.	Away	Competition
1963-64	1	1	Tavolara	0-3	Olbia	Prima Categoria Group A
1963-64	2	1	Olbia	4-1	Tavolara	Prima Categoria Group A
2000-01	3	5	Tavolara	2-1	Olbia	Coppa Italia Dilettanti
2000-01	4	1	Olbia	2-1	Tavolara	Serie D Group D
2000-01	5	5	Tavolara	0-0	Olbia	Serie D Group D
2001-02	6	5	Olbia	3-3	Tavolara	Coppa Italia Dilettanti
2001-02	7	5	Olbia	6-0	Tavolara	Serie B Group D
2001-02	8	5	Tavolara	0-0	Olbia	Serie D Group B
2009-10	9	-	Olbia	5-3	Tavolara	Friendly
2011-12	10	1	Olbia	0-1	Tavolara	Sardinian Cup
2011-12	11	1	Tavolara	0-3	Olbia	Eccellenza Sardinia
2011-12	12	1	Olbia	3-0	Tavolara	Eccellenza Sardinia
2024-25	13	-	Olbia	1-1	Tavolara	Friendly
