= Luca Tomasig =

Italian footballer

Personal information
- Date of birth: 11 March 1983 (age 43)
- Place of birth: Gorizia, Italy
- Height: 1.90 m (6 ft 3 in)
- Position: Goalkeeper

Youth career
- Atalanta

Senior career*
Years	Team	Apps	(Gls)
2001–2003	Atalanta	0	(0)
2001–2002	→ Pozzuolo (loan)	28	(0)
2002–2003	→ Belluno (loan)	15	(0)
2003–2005	Belluno	40	(0)
2005–2006	Cagliari	0	(0)
2006	→ Padova (loan)	6	(0)
2006–2007	Catanzaro	1	(0)
2007–2010	Reggiana	46	(0)
2010–2012	AlbinoLeffe	53	(0)
2012–2013	Reggiana	25	(0)
2013–2014	Novara	1	(0)
Total		215	(0)
- * Club domestic league appearances and goals

Luca Tomasig (originally Tomašić, born 11 March 1983) is an Italian former professional footballer who plays as a goalkeeper.

== Career ==
Tomasig started his senior career for Pozzuolo, then Belluno of Serie D. In summer 2003, he was signed by Belluno in co-ownership deal with Atalanta.

He joined Cagliari in January 2005 in co-ownership, in exchange with Davide Capello on loan, but he left for Padova in January 2006.

In August 2006 he terminated his contract with club and joined Catanzaro. In August 2007, he joined Reggiana, where he became first choice in the 2009–10 season.

On 26 July 2010, he left for Serie B side AlbinoLeffe which the club seek for a reliable keeper, for €10,000. In exchange, Daniel Offredi was sent to Reggiana on loan. On 21 June 2011, AlbinoLeffe bought half of the registration rights of Tomasig for €90,000. On 24 June 2012, Tomasig returned to Reggio Emilia, for just €1,250.

On 2 September 2013, Tomasig was signed by Serie B side Novara Calcio.

== Honours ==
Belluno

- Serie D Group C: 2003
