= Christian Arboleda =

Italian footballer (born 1997)

Personal information
- Date of birth: 20 February 1997 (age 29)
- Place of birth: Perugia, Italy
- Height: 1.78 m (5 ft 10 in)
- Position: Right-back

Team information
- Current team: COS Sarrabus Ogliastra
- Number: 23

Youth career
- –2015: Perugia

Senior career*
Years	Team	Apps	(Gls)
2015–2018	Perugia	0	(0)
2015–2016	→ Foligno (loan)	26	(0)
2016–2017	→ L'Aquila (loan)	21	(0)
2017–2018	→ Arzachena (loan)	29	(0)
2018–2019	Arzachena	27	(0)
2019–2020	Arzachena	8	(0)
2020–2022	Olbia	59	(0)
2023–2025	Olbia	82	(0)
2025–	COS Sarrabus Ogliastra	4	(0)
- * Club domestic league appearances and goals as of 8 March 2026

Christian Arboleda (born 20 February 1997) is an Italian footballer of Colombian descent who plays as a right-back for Serie D club COS Sarrabus Ogliastra.

== Club career ==
He made his Serie C debut for Arzachena on 27 August 2017 in a game against Arezzo.

After playing for the club in the 2017-18 on loan from Perugia, Arboleda joined Serie D club Arzachena permanently in October 2018. He left the club again the end of the season. However, he rejoined the club on 28 November 2019, signing a deal for the rest of the season.

On 7 August 2020 he signed with Olbia. Arboleda left Olbia in June 2022, and did not play in the first half of the 2022–23 season, before returning to the club on 3 January 2023.

On 3 August 2025 he joined Serie D side COS Sarrabus Ogliastra.
