= ASD Sevegliano =

Italian football club

Sevegliano
- Full name: Associazione Sportiva Dilettantistica Sevegliano Fauglis
- Nickname: Canarini (canaries)
- Founded: 1945; 81 years ago as, Unione Sportiva Sevegliano; 2004; 22 years ago as, Associazione Sportiva Dilettantistica Sevegliano; 2016; 10 years ago as, Associazione Sportiva Dilettantistica Sevegliano Fauglis (merged)
- Dissolved: 2026
- Ground: Campo Sportivo di via Vittorio Veneto, Sevegliano, Italy
- Chairman: Stefano De Lorenzi
- 2002–03: Serie D/C, 18th (relegated)
Home colours	Away colours

Associazione Sportiva Dilettantistica Sevegliano Fauglis, or simply Sevegliano, is an Italian association football club located in Sevegliano, a village in the municipality of Bagnaria Arsa, Friuli-Venezia Giulia.

The team decided to withdraw from the 2026–27 Prima Categoria competition due to a serious internal crisis, including the loss of financial resources, the absence of new leadership (management/board), and minimal enthusiasm from the local community.

As a result of this crisis, the team was forced to disband its senior team, leaving only its youth academy still operating.

== History ==
Unione Sportiva Sevegliano (it will become A.S.D. in 2004/05 for fiscal reasons) was officially born on 28 June 1945 by a group of sports enthusiasts. At the beginning it has three sections: tennis, athletics and football. These were the pioneering years of regional amateur football and the "canaries" play in Promozione, disputing various season in the Isonzo group, where high-ranking teams such as Monfalcone and Pro Gorizia ruled.
The team experiences alternating seasons, but in 1958–59, the formation led by captain Francesco Vidal, who counted in his ranks the late Maurizio Zamparini (former owner and president of Palermo F.C.), Carlo Tirelli, Dario Tirelli, Renato Sclauzero and Sergio Peressutti, won the Juniores title and disputes the regional final against U.S. Triestina. In the 1979–80 season comes the first success of regional importance: in the final played in San Canzian d'Isonzo, Sevegliano beat Rosandra (a club from Trieste) and captain Flavio Virginio can raise the Region Cup "M.G. Devetti". In the 1983–84 season, Maurizio Zamparini, one of the "Juniores '58", combines the "Mercatone Zeta" brand with the village association and inaugurates the first of many seasons of great yellow and blue success.
For six seasons, U.S. Sevegliano is the representative society of the smallest inhabited center of Interregionale. Attilio Tesser, in his debut on the bench, should be mentioned among the coaches of the period. Then the club must return to Eccellenza and subsequently to Promozione. There is another trophy on the bulletin board: on 6 January 2008, Sevegliano, led by Maurizio Trombetta, beats A.S.D. Manzanese on penalties and captain Giancarlo Conchione raises the Coppa Italia Dilettanti FVG.

Maurizio Trombetta, in the 2007–08 season was at the helm of A.S.D. Sevegliano in Eccellenza (7th Italian division). In the 2008–09 season he found himself at the helm of CFR Cluj in the 2008–09 UEFA Champions League.

In 2012 A.S.D. Atletico was born in Fauglis, a small village in the municipality of Gonars. The social colors are black and white and the team easily climbs from Terza Categoria to Prima Categoria.

In the summer of 2016, ASD Sevegliano finds itself with a weak team and has just been relegated from Promozione, while ASD Atletico has no stadium, in fact it plays home games in Palmanova; for this reason it seems natural a fusion between these two clubs: the yellow & blue put the sports facilities and the youth sector while the white & black put the players of the first team. Thus was born ASD Sevegliano Fauglis and the colors are white and blue.

=== Recent seasons ===
Season	League									Cups	
Season	Division	P	W	D	L	F	A	Pts	Pos	Cup	Round
1987–88	Prima Categoria, group B								1st ↑	Coppa Italia Dilettanti	Not allowed
1988–89	Promozione	30	8	13	9	30	34	29	11th	Coppa Italia Dilettanti	2nd round
1989–90	Promozione	30	14	10	6	32	21	38	1st ↑	Coppa Italia Dilettanti	1st round
1990–91	Interregionale, group E	34	10	16	8	37	32	36	7th	Coppa Italia Dilettanti	1st round
1991–92	Interregionale, group C	34	9	15	10	40	38	33	8th	Coppa Italia Dilettanti	?
1992–93	C.N.D., group D	34	10	19	5	44	29	39	5th	Coppa Italia Dilettanti	?
1993–94	C.N.D., group D	34	10	15	9	25	28	35	7th	Coppa Italia Dilettanti	?
1994–95	C.N.D., group D	34	5	20	9	22	28	30	12th	Coppa Italia Dilettanti	1st round
1995–96	C.N.D., group D	34	5	12	17	27	53	27	18th ↓	Coppa Italia Dilettanti	2nd round
1996–97	Eccellenza	30	11	12	7	27	23	45	5th	FVG Cup	2nd round
1997–98	Eccellenza	30	15	10	5	42	26	55	4th	FVG Cup	Semifinals
1998–99	Eccellenza	30	14	8	8	40	26	50	4th	FVG Cup	Semifinals
1999–00	Eccellenza	30	22	4	4	52	19	70	1st ↑	FVG Cup	1st round
2000–01	Serie D, group C	34	12	13	9	49	44	49	5th	Serie D Cup	1st round
2001–02	Serie D, group C	34	13	9	12	46	47	48	6th	Serie D Cup	1st round
2002–03	Serie D, group C	34	4	14	16	32	54	26	18th ↓	Serie D Cup	1st round
2003–04	Eccellenza	32	13	11	8	48	36	50	5th	FVG Cup	1st round
2004–05	Eccellenza	30	9	12	9	35	41	39	10th	FVG Cup	Semifinals
2005–06	Eccellenza	30	15	8	7	40	25	53	2nd	FVG Cup	1st round
2006–07	Eccellenza	30	9	8	13	30	30	35	9th	FVG Cup	2nd round
2007–08	Eccellenza	30	11	12	7	30	22	45	4th	FVG Cup	Winners
2007–08	Eccellenza	30	11	12	7	30	22	45	4th	Coppa Italia Dilettanti	Eighters
2008–09	Eccellenza	30	10	10	10	25	26	40	8th	FVG Cup	Semifinals
2009–10	Eccellenza	30	6	12	12	20	36	30	14th ↓	FVG Cup	1st round
2010–11	Promozione, group A	30	13	10	7	43	35	49	6th	FVG Cup	2nd round
2011–12	Promozione, group A	30	9	4	17	38	40	31	14th	FVG Cup	1st round
2012–13	Promozione, group A	30	12	5	13	45	46	41	8th	FVG Cup	1st round
2013–14	Promozione, group B	30	8	9	13	30	46	33	11th	Promozione Cup	Eighters
2014–15	Promozione, group B	30	9	11	10	31	37	38	9th	Promozione Cup	Semifinals
2015–16	Promozione, group B	30	4	2	24	19	65	14	15th ↓	Promozione Cup	1st round
2016–17	Prima Categoria, group C	30	9	10	11	40	30	37	10th	Prima Categoria Cup	1st round
2017–18	Prima Categoria, group B	30	12	11	7	55	41	35	4th	Prima Categoria Cup	Eighters
2018–19	Prima Categoria, group B	30	18	7	5	60	26	61	1st ↑	Prima Categoria Cup	Semifinals
2019–20	Promozione, group B	22	11	6	5	35	20	39	5th	Promozione Cup	Interrupted
2020–21	Promozione, group B	5	2	2	1	6	6	8		Promozione Cup	Interrupted
Source: Messaggero Veneto – Giornale del Friuli

=== Key ===
1st	2nd	↑	↓
Champions	Runners-up	Promoted	Relegated

== Honours ==
- Eccellenza Friuli-Venezia Giulia (1st regional level)

Winners: 1989–90, 1999–00

- Promozione Friuli-Venezia Giulia (2nd regional level)

Winners: 1987–88

- Prima Categoria Friuli-Venezia Giulia (3rd regional level)

Winners: 2018–19

- Coppa Italia Dilettanti Friuli-Venezia Giulia

Winners: 2007–08

- Supercup Friuli-Venezia Giulia

Winners: 2000

== Colors and badge ==
ASD Sevegliano colors were yellow and blue, while new club ones are white and blue.
