= US Venafro =

Italian football club

Venafro
- Full name: Unione Sportiva Venafro
- Founded: 1966
- Ground: Stadio Marchese A. del Prete, Venafro, Italy
- Capacity: 2000
- Chairman: Nicandro Patriciello
- Manager: Alberto Bernardi
- League: Eccellenza Molise
- 2020–21: Eccellenza Molise, 3rd
Home colours	Away colours

Unione Sportiva Venafro is an Italian association football club located in the Italian Comune of Venafro, Molise.

Venafro were one of nine teams excluded from the 2011–12 Serie D and relegated to Eccellenza Molise.
