= Eccellenza Molise =

- Organising body: Lega Nazionale Dilettanti
- Founded: 1991
- Country: Italy
- Confederation: UEFA
- Number of clubs: 16
- Promotion to: Serie D
- Relegation to: Promozione Molise
- League cup: Coppa Italia Dilettanti
- Current champions: Venafro (2025–26)
- Most championships: Isernia, Campobasso (5 titles each)
- Website: http://www.lnd.it

Eccellenza Molise is the regional Eccellenza football division for clubs in the southern Italian region of Molise. It consists of 16 teams competing in one group. The winning team is promoted to Serie D, the top level of Italian amateur football. The club that finishes second may also gain promotion by taking part in a two-round national play-off.

== Champions ==
The past champions of Eccellenza Molise were

- 1992–93 Campobasso
- 1993–94 Roccaravindola
- 1994–95 Interamnia
- 1995–96 Frenter Larino
- 1996–97 Campobasso
- 1997–98 Real Isernia
- 1998–99 Bojano
- 1999–2000 Termoli
- 2000–01 S.Giorgio Collathia
- 2001–02 Termoli
- 2002–03 Bojano
- 2003–04 Venafro
- 2004–05 Campobasso
- 2005–06 Petacciato
- 2006–07 Olympia Agnonese
- 2007–08 Atletico Trivento
- 2008–09 Bojano
- 2009–10 Venafro
- 2010–11 Isernia
- 2011–12 Termoli
- 2012–13 Bojano
- 2013–14 Campobasso
- 2014–15 Isernia
- 2015–16 Gioventù Dauna
- 2016–17 Macchia
- 2017–18 Isernia
- 2018–19 Vastogirardi
- 2019–20 Comprensorio Vairano
- 2020–21 Aurora Alto Casertano
- 2021–22 Termoli
- 2022–23 Campobasso
- 2023–24 Isernia
- 2024–25 Vastogirardi
- 2025-26 Venafro
