= Maurizio Trombetta =

Italian footballer (born 1962)

Personal information
- Date of birth: 29 September 1962 (age 64)
- Place of birth: Udine, Italy
- Position: Right-back

Team information
- Current team: AC Milan (assistant)

Senior career*
Years	Team	Apps	(Gls)
1981–1982	Udinese		
1982–1983	Catanzaro		
1983–1985	SPAL		
1985–1988	Giorgione		
1988–1992	Triestina		
1992–1993	Pistoiese		

Managerial career
- 2007–2008: Sevegliano
- 2008: CFR Cluj (assistant)
- 2008: CFR Cluj
- 2010: Reggina U19
- 2011: Târgu Mureș
- 2014–: Juventus (technical assistant)
- * Club domestic league appearances and goals

Maurizio Trombetta (born 29 September 1962) is an Italian football manager and former player. He was head coach of Romanian Liga I clubs CFR Cluj and Târgu Mureș, and youth team coach at Reggina.

== Playing career ==
Trombetta was born in Udine. A minor league player who played Serie A only in his first two professional seasons, respectively with Udinese and Catanzaro, he also played from 1989 to 1991 in Serie B with Triestina.

== Coaching career ==
Following his retirement as a player, Trombetta became Udinese's allievi (under-16) youth coach in 1994, being appointed as Giovanni Galeone's assistant coach with the zebrette. He then followed Galeone to Perugia and Napoli before returning to Udine, this time as Francesco Guidolin's assistant coach. From 1999 to 2004 he and Guidolin moved to Bologna, both working with the rossoblu.

In 2004, the duo returned to Ancona, and then at Udinese in 2006–07.

During the 2007–08 season, Trombetta chose to start a coaching career of his own and became head coach of amateur Eccellenza club Sevegliano after league Week 7. The team was at the bottom of the league table and led them to an impressive fourth place finish. In June 2008, he was appointed as the new assistant coach of Romanian Liga I outgoing champions CFR Cluj and was promoted to head coach in September as a replacement for dismissed boss Ioan Andone. Under his tenure as CFR Cluj coach, the club is also competing for their first time ever in the UEFA Champions League as Romanian champions; in his first game in the top European competition, which came only fifteen days after his appointment as head coach, Trombetta's team won 2–1 at Stadio Olimpico to Roma thanks to two goals by Emmanuel Culio in a historical victory against the renowned giallorossi team, who were taking part to the UEFA Champions League as Serie A runners-up.

He was dismissed in January 2009, after only four months in charge, leaving CFR Cluj in fourth place in the Liga I and only weeks after having been eliminated from the UEFA Champions League.

In February 2010, he was announced by Reggina as new head of the Primavera under-19 youth team, replacing Roberto Breda after he was promoted head coach days earlier.

In November 2011, he returned to Romania, signing a contract for a season with Târgu Mureș. He was released after two months.

== Coaching statistics ==
As of 17 December 2011

Team	Nat	From	To	Record						
Team	Nat	From	To	G	W	D	L	GF	GA	Win %
CFR Cluj	(Romania)	12 September 2008	4 January 2009	11	6	3	2	16	9	54.55
Târgu Mureș	(Romania)	4 November 2011	20 January 2012	6	2	2	2	5	4	33.33
Total				17	8	5	4	21	13	47.06
