= Andrea Peana =

Italian footballer (born 1986)

Personal information
- Date of birth: 12 February 1986 (age 40)
- Place of birth: Alghero, Italy
- Height: 1.76 m (5 ft 9 in)
- Position: Defender

Team information
- Current team: FC Alghero

Youth career
- –2005: Cagliari

Senior career*
Years	Team	Apps	(Gls)
2005–2006	Cagliari	0	(0)
2007–2008	Triestina	13	(0)
2008	→ Crotone (loan)	7	(0)
2008	Portogruaro	11	(1)
2009–2010	Alghero	25	(0)
2010	Castiadas	12	(2)
2010–2013	Alghero		
2013–2015	Olbia	72	(0)
2016	Grosseto	5	(0)
2016–2017	Nuorese	27	(0)
2017–2018	Arzachena	29	(1)
2018–2019	Torres	29	(0)
2019–2024	Arzachena	12	(0)
2024-	Fc Alghero	20	(1)
- * Club domestic league appearances and goals as of 14:38, 9 January 2020 (UTC)

Andrea Peana (born 12 February 1986) is an Italian footballer who currently plays as a defender for FC Alghero.

== Club career ==
Peana made his Serie B debut for Triestina in the 2007–08 season.

On 11 August 2019, he returned to Arzachena.
