= Maarten van der Want =

Dutch footballer

Personal information
- Date of birth: 15 January 1995 (age 31)
- Place of birth: Delft, The Netherlands
- Height: 1.91 m (6 ft 3 in)
- Position: Goalkeeper

Team information
- Current team: Tavolara Calcio
- Number: 22

Youth career
- –2014: ADO Den Haag

Senior career*
Years	Team	Apps	(Gls)
2014–2015	Virtus Entella	0	(0)
2015–	Olbia	61	(0)
- * Club domestic league appearances and goals as of 4 May 2024

Maarten van der Want (born 15 January 1995) is a Dutch footballer who plays as a goalkeeper for Italian club Tavolara Calcio

== Career statistics ==
=== Club ===
As of match played 22 December 2021

Club	Season	League			National Cup		League Cup		Other		Total	
Club	Season	Division	Apps	Goals	Apps	Goals	Apps	Goals	Apps	Goals	Apps	Goals
Olbia	2015–16	Serie D	12	0	0	0	–		2 (Note: Appearances in the 2015–16 Serie D promotion play-off)	0	14	0
Olbia	2016–17	Lega Pro	5	0	0	0	2 (Note: Appearances in the Coppa Italia Serie C)	0	0	0	7	0
Olbia	2017–18	Serie C	0	0	0	0	–		0	0	0	0
Olbia	2018–19	Serie C	14	0	0	0	–		0	0	14	0
Olbia	2019–20	Serie C	9	0	0	0	2	0	0	0	11	0
Olbia	2020–21	Serie C	1	0	0	0	0	0	0	0	1	0
Olbia	2021–22	Serie C	7	0	0	0	0	0	0	0	7	0
Career total			48	0	0	0	4	0	2	0	54	0
