= Attilio Tesser =

Italian football manager (born 1958)

Personal information
- Date of birth: 10 June 1958 (age 68)
- Place of birth: Montebelluna, Italy
- Height: 1.76 m (5 ft 9 in)
- Position: Full-back

Team information
- Current team: Reggiana (head coach)

Youth career
- Montebelluna

Senior career*
Years	Team	Apps	(Gls)
1974–1976	Montebelluna	43	(0)
1976–1978	Treviso	63	(6)
1978–1980	Napoli	37	(2)
1980–1985	Udinese	100	(6)
1985–1986	Perugia	34	(0)
1986–1989	Catania	85	(4)
1989–1991	Trento	34	(2)
Total		396	(20)

International career
1979–1980	Italy U-21	5	(0)

Managerial career
- 1992–1994: Sevegliano
- 1994–1996: Udinese (youth team)
- 1996–2001: Venezia (youth team)
- 2001–2003: Südtirol
- 2003–2005: Triestina
- 2005: Cagliari
- 2006: Ascoli
- 2007–2008: Mantova
- 2009: Padova
- 2009–2012: Novara
- 2012: Novara
- 2013–2015: Ternana
- 2015–2016: Avellino
- 2016: Avellino
- 2016–2018: Cremonese
- 2018–2021: Pordenone
- 2021–2023: Modena
- 2023–2024: Triestina
- 2024–2025: Triestina
- 2025–2026: Triestina
- 2026–: Reggiana
- * Club domestic league appearances and goals

Attilio Tesser (born 10 June 1958) is an Italian football manager and former player who is the head coach of Serie C Group B club Reggiana.

== Playing career ==
A full-back, Tesser started his playing career with Treviso. He moved to Napoli in 1978, where he played two seasons. He then played for Udinese from 1980 to 1985, and later for lower-league teams, including Perugia and Catania. He was also capped for the Italian U-21 side.

== Managerial career ==
After his retirement, Tesser began a coaching career in 1992 for Serie D side Sevegliano, and successively became a coach at the youth level for Udinese and Venezia. His first professional coaching job came in 2001, for Serie C2 side F.C. Südtirol. In 2003, he replaced Ezio Rossi at the helm of U.S. Triestina Calcio of Serie B.

After an excellent season, followed by a poorer one, Tesser moved to Cagliari Calcio of Serie A in 2006, but was fired just after the first league match by team chairman Massimo Cellino. In July 2006, he was named coach of Ascoli, replacing Marco Giampaolo. However, after a series of struggling results ended in a 1–0 home defeat to Empoli F.C. in the 11th matchday, Tesser was fired and replaced by Nedo Sonetti.

Tesser started the 2007–08 season at the helm of Serie B side Mantova, with the aim to fight for a promotion spot; however, results did not confirm the initial goals, and he was sacked on 24 February 2008, leaving Mantova in seventh place, seven points far from the fourth playoff spot.

In January 2009 he accepted a coaching offer from Lega Pro Prima Divisione club Padova; however, his stint with the patavini lasted only one month, as he was sacked later on February.

In June 2009, he was named manager of Novara. His tenure proved highly successful, as he led his club to the Lega Pro Prima Divisione title in his first season in charge.

In the 2010–11 season, Tesser repeated himself as he guided Novara to third place in the final table, then won a second consecutive promotion to Serie A after defeating Reggina and Padova in the playoffs. The Serie A comeback however proved to be particularly difficult for Novara, who only won 12 points after the first 20 games: this cost Tesser the job, as he was removed from his managerial duties on 30 January 2012 following a 2–0 away loss against Palermo; he was replaced by veteran coach Emiliano Mondonico.

On 6 March 2012, he was recalled by Novara as head coach, but on 31 October 2012 he was again sacked.

On 13 June 2015, Tesser was appointed as the head coach of Avellino, replacing Massimo Rastelli.

In the summer of 2016, he was hired by the Cremonese. He was dismissed from Cremonese on 23 April 2018.

On 4 July 2018, Tesser has been appointed as the new head coach of Pordenone Calcio. On his first season as Pordenone boss, he guided the small Friuli club to direct promotion to Serie B (the first in club history) as Serie C/B champions.

He was fired on 3 April 2021 after a 4–1 loss to Brescia that left Pordenone two points shy of relegation.

Tesser was subsequently named new head coach of ambitious Serie C club Modena for the 2021–22 season; under his guidance, the Canarini won the Group B title by the end of the campaign, thus ensuring themselves promotion to Serie B for the following season. After a mid-table finish in the 2022–23 Serie B campaign, Tesser was dismissed by the end of the season as Modena appointed Paolo Bianco at his replacement; successively, Tesser was appointed in charge of Serie C club Triestina.

On 4 February 2024, following a home loss against Pro Patria, Tesser was dismissed from his coaching post with immediate effect. On 27 November 2024, he accepted to return to Triestina, as the club was dead last in the league.

After guiding Triestina to safety, Tesser was not confirmed as the club's manager, largely due to financial issues that eventually led to a 20-point deduction just before the start of the new season. On 24 October 2025, just a day after the removal of interim head coach Geppino Marino, Tesser was reinstated as Triestina head coach for his fourth stint in charge of the Alabardati. On 21 January 2026, after failing to turn the club's fortunes, Tesser departed from Triestina by mutual consent.

On 5 June 2026, Tesser was hired by Reggiana in Serie C with a one-season contract.

== Managerial statistics ==
As of match played 4 February 2024

Managerial record by team and tenure
Team	From	To	Record							
Team	From	To	G	W	D	L	GF	GA	GD	Win %
Südtirol	1 July 2001	30 June 2003	86	37	31	18	125	85	+40	43.02
Triestina	1 July 2003	30 June 2005	96	32	32	32	106	113	−7	33.33
Cagliari	1 July 2005	29 August 2005	4	2	1	1	8	6	+2	50.00
Ascoli	20 May 2006	13 November 2006	13	1	4	8	11	16	−5	7.69
Mantova	11 June 2007	24 February 2008	28	12	6	10	40	34	+6	42.86
Padova	13 January 2009	22 February 2009	5	1	1	3	1	5	−4	20.00
Novara	11 June 2009	30 January 2012	114	47	40	27	165	123	+42	41.23
Novara	6 March 2012	31 October 2012	26	8	8	10	35	40	−5	30.77
Ternana	31 December 2013	13 June 2015	65	21	20	24	68	83	−15	32.31
Avellino	13 June 2015	22 March 2016	34	13	7	14	49	48	+1	38.24
Avellino	20 April 2016	31 May 2016	5	1	2	2	5	9	−4	20.00
Cremonese	31 May 2016	23 April 2018	83	35	25	23	119	97	+22	42.17
Pordenone	4 July 2018	3 April 2021	116	46	42	28	144	117	+27	39.66
Modena	22 June 2021	23 May 2023	84	45	18	21	136	90	+46	53.57
Triestina	11 July 2023	4 February 2024	27	16	4	7	47	25	+22	59.26
Total			786	317	241	228	1,059	891	+168	40.33

== Honours ==
=== Managerial ===
Novara

- Lega Pro Prima Divisione: 2009–10
- Supercoppa Lega Pro: 2010

Cremonese

- Lega Pro: 2016–17

Pordenone

- Serie C: 2018–19
- Supercoppa di Serie C: 2019

Modena

- Serie C: 2021–22

=== Individual ===
- Panchina d'Argento: 2010–11
