= Marcello Mancosu =

Italian footballer

Personal information
- Date of birth: 15 April 1992 (age 34)
- Place of birth: Cagliari, Italy
- Height: 1.77 m (5 ft 10 in)
- Positions: Right winger; striker

Team information
- Current team: Tuttocuoio

Youth career
- –2010: Cagliari

Senior career*
Years	Team	Apps	(Gls)
2010–2014	Selargius	72	(1)
2014–2015	Trapani	0	(0)
2014	→ Pavia (loan)	7	(1)
2014–2015	→ Gubbio (loan)	35	(5)
2015–2016	Lumezzane	26	(1)
2016–2017	Lupa Roma	18	(1)
2017	Catanzaro	12	(0)
2017	Nuorese	11	(2)
2017–	Tuttocuoio	9	(1)
- * Club domestic league appearances and goals as of 26 February 2018

Sadali

Marcello Mancosu (born 15 April 1992) is an Italian footballer who plays as a forward for Tuttocuoio.

== Career ==
Born in Cagliari, Sardinia, Mancosu started his career at Cagliari Calcio, where his elder brother Matteo was a member of the first team in 2007–08 season. Mancosu was a player for their under–17 team in 2008–09 season. He only able to play once for Cagliari's reserves in the next season, on 27 February 2010 (round 18).

Mancosu left for amateur club Selargius in 2010, where he played 3 1/2 seasons in the fifth tier. On 31 January 2014 Mancosu was signed by fellow Sardinian club Trapani. However, he was immediately farmed to Lega Pro Prima Divisione from the Serie B club, unable to play along with his eldest brother Matteo who was a member of Trapani's first team (until January 2015). On 23 July Marcello left for another Lega Pro club Gubbio. Mancosu brothers received call-up to 2014 pre-season camp on 12 July.

In July 2015 Mancosu was signed by Lumezzane, his third Lega Pro club.

On 22 August Mancosu remained in the third tier, signing for Lupa Roma.

== Personal life ==
Mancosu is the youngest brother of fellow footballers Matteo and Marco.
