= Gabriele Volpi =

Italian-born Nigerian businessman (born 1943)

- Born: 29 June 1943 (age 82); Recco, Italy
- Known for: Owner (former), Spezia Calcio; Owner (former), HNK Rijeka; Owner, Pro Recco
- Spouse: Rosi Volpi
- Children: 2

Gabriele Volpi (born 29 June 1943) is an Italian-born Nigerian businessman, active in various sectors in Nigeria and Angola, the former owner of Italian football club Spezia Calcio and Croatian football club HNK Rijeka.

== Early life ==
Gabriele Volpi was born in Recco, province of Genoa, Italy on 29 June 1943.

== Career ==
He moved to Nigeria in the 1970s, and became a naturalized citizen.

His holding company Orlean Invest Holding includes all of his Nigerian businesses including Intels Oilfield, Port Harcourt.

Gabriele Volpi (Male Residence Hall) at the American University of Nigeria is named after him.

== Sports clubs ==
Volpi owns the Italian water polo club Pro Recco. From September 2013 until December 2017 he was also the owner of the Croatian football club HNK Rijeka, and he also owned Italian football club Spezia Calcio from 2008 and 2021, and Italian football club Arzachena from 2019 to 2023.

== Personal life ==
He is married to Rosi Volpi, and has two sons, Simone and Matteo, who both work in his businesses.

Volpi owned a 60-metre yacht, Givi. Currently owns the 75-metre yacht "Reborn", ex-"Boadicea".
