= Francesco Indirli =

Italian footballer

Personal information
- Full name: Francesco Indirli
- Date of birth: 27 September 1987 (age 39)
- Place of birth: San Pietro Vernotico, Italy
- Position: Defender

Senior career*
Years	Team	Apps	(Gls)
2005–2006	San Marino Calcio	0	(0)
2006–2007	Russi	4	(0)
2006	→ Santarcangelo (loan)	14	(0)
2007–2008	San Marino Calcio	0	(0)
2008–2009	Manfredonia	1	(0)
- * Club domestic league appearances and goals as of 19:24, 23 April 2010 (UTC)

Francesco Indirli (born 27 September 1987 in San Pietro Vernotico, Italy) is an Italian footballer who plays as a defender. He is currently unattached.
