= Eccellenza Sardinia =

- Organising body: Lega Nazionale Dilettanti
- Founded: 1991
- Country: Italy
- Confederation: UEFA
- Number of clubs: 17
- Promotion to: Serie D
- Relegation to: Promozione Sardinia
- Domestic cup: Sardinian Cup
- League cup: Coppa Italia Dilettanti
- Current champions: Budoni (2024–25)
- Most championships: Ilvamaddalena (3 titles)
- Website: https://www.figc-sardegna.it/

Eccellenza Sardinia is the regional Italian Eccellenza football division for clubs in Sardinia and is the main football championship played on the island. Formerly called Prima Categoria and Promozione, it usually involves the participation of 17 teams. Whoever scores the most points wins the title of Regional Champion and is directly promoted to the Serie D, the highest amateur championship. The teams ranked second to fifth enter the play-offs (with a single final on a neutral field). The winner advances to the national phase, which includes inter-regional play-offs for a place in Serie D. The twelfth and thirteenth placed clubs face each other in the play-outs to decide the team that will participate in the inter-divisional play-offs against the winners of the promotion play-offs to avoid relegation. The last three placed teams (fourteenth, fifteenth, and sixteenth) are automatically relegated to the Promozione.

== History ==
Due to its insularity, the top regional football championship in Sardinia has developed differently from the rest of Italy. In particular, it evolved through friendly tournaments of an unofficial and U.L.I.C. until the first post-war period. It was only in 1922 that the regional committee announced the first regional championship of the Terza Divisione. However, this championship was never played due to the presence of only Cagliari, which was declared the first Sardinian champions automatically without ever taking the field. However, the red-blues lacked the necessary requisites for the national championship of the Seconda Divisione and had to enroll in the following Terza Divisione championship, which can be considered as the first federal championship officially played in Sardinia: the first official kick-off on the island was whistled on 21 April 1924, at the 'Stallaggio Meloni' in Cagliari, between S.G. Amsicora and Cagliari, and ended with a score of 3 to 0 for the rossoblù.

S.G. Amsicora, Cagliari, and Torres took part in the championship. Cagliari won the title in 1923–1924 and 1924–1925. It also almost won the 1925–1926 league but was canceled following riots between Amsicora (from Cagliari) and Torres (from Sassari). Alternating years followed, in which the Terza Divisione remained the only championship played on the island. Exceptions were the 1926–27, 1930–31, and 1935–36 seasons, in which there was no tournament, and the 1934–35 season, because the second division was not organized. From the 1936–1937 season, the Sardinian championship assumed the title of Prima Divisione and was played regularly until the 1942–1943 season, after which the official championships were suspended due to the Second World War.

The Prima Divisione restarted from the 1945–46 season and changed its name several times: The first name was Prima Categoria, then Promozione, Campionato Dilettanti Sardegna, and again Promozione, until it took on the definitive name of Eccellenza in 1991–1992.

== Sardinian champion titles per team ==
Below is the historical ranking of the teams that have won the top regional championship in Sardinia from 1924. From the 1981–82 season to the 1989–90 season, the title was awarded equally to the first classified teams of both rounds. There are 52 teams that have won the maximum Sardinian title from the 1922–23 season to the 2022–23 season, for a total of 94 championships played.

This is the list of all the clubs who won the Sardinian First Division winners until the establishment of Eccellenza in 1991–92:

- 1922–23 – Cagliari (1)
- 1923–24 – Cagliari (2)
- 1924–25 – Cagliari (3)
- 1927–28 – Cagliari (4)
- 1928–29 – Iglesias (1)
- 1929–30 – Torres (1)
- 1936–37 – Cagliari (5)
- 1938–39 – Olbia (1)
- 1938–39 – Ilva (1)
- 1940–41 – Medusa Bosa (1)
- 1941–42 – Medusa Bosa (2)
- 1945–46 – Cagliari (6)
- 1946–47 – Quartu (1)
- 1947–48 – Montevecchio (1)
- 1948–49 – Monreale (1)
- 1949–50 – Torres (2)
- 1950–51 – Torres (3)
- 1951–52 – CUS Cagliari (1)
- 1952–53 – Olbia (2)
- 1953–54 – Monreale (2)
- 1954–55 – Calangianus (1)
- 1955–56 – Tempio (1)
- 1956–57 – Olbia (3)
- 1957–58 – Nuorese (1)
- 1958–59 – Calangianus (2)
- 1959–60 – Calangianus (3)
- 1960–61 – Ilvamaddalena (2)
- 1961–62 – Ilvamaddalena (3)
- 1962–63 – Carbonia (1)
- 1963–64 – Olbia (4)
- 1964–65 – Sorso (1)
- 1965–66 – Quartu Sant'Elena (1)
- 1966–67 – Alghero (1)
- 1967–68 – Nuorese (2)
- 1968–69 – Iglesias (2)
- 1969–70 – Guspini (1)
- 1970–71 – Nuorese (3)
- 1971–72 – Iglesias (3)
- 1972–73 – Seunis Thiesi (1)
- 1973–74 – Tharros (1)
- 1974–75 – Sant'Elena (1)
- 1975–76 – Calangianus (4)
- 1976–77 – Alghero (2)
- 1977–78 – Carbonia (2)
- 1978–79 – Calangianus (5)
- 1979–80 – Isili (1)
- 1980–81 – Sorso (2)
- 1981–82 – Fertilia (1)
- 1982–83 – Gialeto (1) / S. Marco Cabras (1)
- 1983–84 – Fersulcis (1) / Ozierese (1)
- 1984–85 – Pirri (1) / Macomer (1)
- 1985–86 – Gonnesa (1) / Sprint Ittiri (1)
- 1986–87 – La Palma MU (1) / Ilva (4)
- 1987–88 – Iglesias (4)
- 1988–89 – Pirri (2) / Ozierese (2)
- 1989–90 – Selargius (1) / Terralba (1)
- 1990–91 Alghero (3)

== Eccellenza Champions ==
The past champions of Eccellenza Sardinia were:

- 1991–92 – Castelsardo (1)
- 1992–93 – Iglesias (5)
- 1993–94 – Fermassenti (1)
- 1994–95 – Ilvamaddalena (5)
- 1995–96 – Atletico Elmas (1)
- 1996–97 – Santa Teresa (1)
- 1997–98 – Arzachena (1)
- 1998–99 – Villacidrese (1)
- 1999–00 – Tavolara (1)
- 2000–01 – Atletico Elmas (2)
- 2001–02 – Calangianus (6)
- 2002–03 – Arzachena (2)
- 2003–04 – Alghero (4)
- 2004–05 – Nuorese (4)
- 2005–06 – Tempio (2)
- 2006–07 – Tavolara (2)
- 2007–08 – Budoni (2)
- 2008–09 – Sanluri (1)
- 2009–10 – Porto Torres (1)
- 2010–11 – Progetto Sant'Elia (1)
- 2011–12 – Torres (4)
- 2012–13 – Olbia (5)
- 2013–14 – Nuorese (5)
- 2014–15 – Muravera (1)
- 2015–16 – Sassari (1)
- 2016–17 – Tortolì (1)
- 2017–18 – Castiadas (1)
- 2018–19 – Muravera (2)
- 2019–20 – Carbonia (3)
- 2020–21 – Atletico Uri (1)
- 2021–22 – Ilvamaddalena (6)
- 2022–23 – Latte Dolce (2)
- 2023–24 – Ilvamaddalena (7)
- 2024–25 – Budoni (2)
