= ASD Termoli Calcio 1920 =

Italian football club

Termoli
- Full name: Associazione Sportiva Dilettantistica Termoli Calcio
- Founded: 1920
- Ground: Stadio Gino Cannarsa, Termoli, Italy
- Capacity: 3,300
- Chairman: Nicola Cesare
- Head coach: Domenico Giacomarro
- League: Serie D/F
- 2012–13: Serie D/F, 2nd
Home colours	Away colours

Associazione Sportiva Dilettantistica Termoli Calcio 1920 is an Italian association football club located in Termoli, Molise. The club currently plays in Serie D.

== History ==
The history of Termoli begins in the mid-1920s. The team played in amateur leagues Abruzzo. In 1951–52 he participated in Promozione Nazionale and the town at that time which had about 10,000 inhabitants hosted companies such as Ascoli, Pescara, Perugia and Terni.

For many years he played in the fields of Abruzzo and the end of the 1969–70 season, won the Series D (with a playoff victory against Avezzano). Since then, with mixed results, participates between Serie D and Eccellenza (first in Abruzzo (won in 1992) and next in Molise (won in 2000, 2002 and 2012).

After a tough corporate crises, culminating in relegation in the championship in 2010 Molise Promozione. Came back in Serie D thanks to an expansion of the company and the entrance to the New President Nicolas Caesar. On 15 February 2012 won the Coppa Italia Molise by beating Campobasso 1919 in the final.

In the season 2011–12 the club was promoted to Serie D after have won Eccellenza Molise.

== Colors and badge ==
The club colors are yellow, red and black.

== Rivals ==
The rivals are Isernia, Campobasso and Vasto.
