= ASD Bojano =

Italian football club

Bojano
- Full name: Associazione Sportiva Dilettantistica Bojano
- Founded: 1962; 2014 (refoundation)
- Ground: Stadio Adriano Colalillo, Bojano, Italy
- Capacity: 3,368
- Chairman: Domenico Di Conza
- Manager: Primo Berlinghieri
- League: Prima Categoria Molise
- 2013–14: Serie D/F, 18th (demoted)
Home colours	Away colours

Associazione Sportiva Dilettantistica Bojano is an Italian association football club located in Bojano, Molise.

== History ==
It played 2008–09 in Eccellenza Molise, which they won, therefore assuring promotion back to Serie D after their relegation in 2007–08. In the season 2010–11, from Serie D group F relegated and so back to Eccellenza Molise. The team returned to Serie D after winning Eccellenza Molise in 2012–13 season. In the 2013–14 Serie D season it was excluded by the LND after 29 match days for refusing to play four games. It was subsequently admitted to Prima Categoria Molisana in August 2014.

During their 2007–08 campaign, Zdenek Zeman's son Karel served as head coach for the club.

== Colors and Badge ==
Its colors are white and red.
