= Lorenzo De Grazia =

Italian football player

Personal information
- Date of birth: 1 April 1995 (age 31)
- Place of birth: Ascoli Piceno, Italy
- Height: 1.76 m (5 ft 9 in)
- Position: Midfielder

Team information
- Current team: L'Aquila
- Number: 21

Youth career
- –2014: Ascoli

Senior career*
Years	Team	Apps	(Gls)
2014–2017	Ascoli	2	(0)
2014–2015	→ Maceratese (loan)	33	(2)
2016–2017	→ Maceratese (loan)	36	(1)
2017–2019	Teramo	68	(6)
2019–2020	Modena	17	(4)
2020–2021	Ravenna	14	(0)
2021–2022	Piacenza	10	(0)
2022	Teramo	12	(2)
2022–2024	Floriana	34	(4)
2024–2025	Olbia	31	(8)
2025–2026	Union Clodiense Chioggia	20	(5)
2026–	L'Aquila	7	(0)
- * Club domestic league appearances and goals as of 22 March 2026

Lorenzo De Grazia (born 1 April 1995) is an Italian professional footballer who plays as a midfielder for Serie D club L'Aquila.

== Club career ==
He made his Serie B debut for Ascoli on 2 April 2016 in a game against Perugia.

For 2019–20 season, he joined Modena.

On 5 October 2020 he signed a two-year contract with Ravenna.

On 30 September 2021, he joined to Piacenza.

On 11 January 2022, he returned to Teramo.

On 20 September 2022, De Grazia signed with Floriana in Malta.

On 15 August 2024, De Grazia joined Olbia in Serie D, where he scored 8 goals in 31 appearances.

In July 2025, he moved to Union Clodiense Chioggia. After making 20 appearances and scoring 5 goals, he rescinded his contract.

On 23 January 2026, he subsequently signed with L'Aquila.
