= Città di Isernia San Leucio SSD =

Italian football club

Isernia
- Full name: Città di Isernia San Leucio; Società Sportiva Dilettantistica a r.l.
- Nicknames: Sanniti (Samnites); Pentri
- Founded: 1928; 2004 (refounded); 2009 (refounded)
- Ground: Stadio Mario Lancellotta, Isernia, Italy
- Capacity: 5,000
- Chairman: Francesco Paolo Traisci
- Manager: Domenico Farrocco
- League: Eccellenza Molise
- 2023–24: Eccellenza Molise, 1st (promoted)
Home colours	Away colours

Città di Isernia San Leucio Società Sportiva Dilettantistica, commonly known as Città di Isernia or just Isernia, is an Italian association football club based in the city of Isernia, Molise. The club currently plays in Eccellenza. Their nickname is "pentri" (this is the name of the most important tribe of the Samnites). They play their home matches at Stadio Mario Lancellotta.

== History ==
=== Foundation ===
Founded in 1928 as Samnium Isernia, the club spent the majority of its history in semi-professional and regional levels of Italian football. In the seasons 1984–85, 1985–86 and 2003–04, Isernia played in Serie C2 (currently Lega Pro Seconda Divisione), the 4th Italian professional football level.

=== Re-foundations ===
==== From Sporting Isernia to Sporting Aesernia ====
After going bankrupt in 2004, the club was immediately re-founded as A.S.D. Sporting Isernia and in 2007 was merged with A.S.D. Aesernia to form A.S.D. Sporting Aesernia.

=== From Real Isernia to Isernia F.C. ===
In the summer of 2009, the new club that played in Promozione was merged with A.S.D. Real Rocca d'Evandro 2006 of Scapoli, in Eccellenza Molise, founding A.S.D. Real Isernia.

First classified in 2010–11 Eccellenza Molise, in the summer 2011 the club was renamed Isernia F.C. playing from the 2011–2012 season in Serie D.

== Colours and badge ==
Its colours are white and sky blue.

== Stadium ==
The home ground is the Stadio Mario Lancellotta.
