= 2003–04 Serie C2 =

Fouth Italian football championship

The Serie C2 2003-2004 was the twenty-sixth edition of the minor professional competition of the present-day Serie C.

Rules

Three independent championships (North, Centre, South). In each group: first team promoted, last team relegated, one more promoted team in a playoff of four teams, two more relegated teams in a two-legged playoff.

== Group A (North) ==
		North	Pt	G	V	N	P	GF	GS
15px	1.	AC Mantova (P)	64	34	17	13	4	40	21
15px	2.	Cremonese (O,P)	60	34	16	12	6	47	23
	3.	Sudtirol-Alto Adige	58	34	14	16	4	40	22
	4.	Valenzana	54	34	13	15	6	32	22
	5.	AC Pizzighettone	50	34	13	11	10	35	29
	6.	AC Meda (E,R,R)	46	34	11	13	10	44	41
	7.	Ivrea	46	34	11	13	10	33	33
	8.	Calcio Monza	45	34	10	15	9	33	31
	9.	Pro Sesto	44	34	10	14	10	30	32
	10.	Biellese	44	34	11	11	12	28	30
	11.	Olbia	43	34	10	13	11	27	32
	12.	Belluno	42	34	11	9	14	41	40
	13.	Calcio Montichiari	41	34	9	14	11	30	28
	14.	Calcio Legnano	41	34	9	14	11	24	32
	15.	Pro Vercelli (T)	41	34	9	14	11	30	39
15px	16.	Savona (R)	38	34	9	11	14	29	34
	17.	Sassuolo	27	34	5	12	17	26	43
	18.	Pro Palazzolo (T)	21	34	5	6	23	27	64

Pro Vercelli re-elected instead of Meda.

== Group B (Centre) ==
    Squadra                    Punti
 1. GROSSETO                   64                Promoted to Serie C1
----------------------------------
 2. SANGIOVANNESE              62                Promoted to Serie C1 after playoff
 3. Gualdo                     56
 4. San Marino                 53
 5. Gubbio                     49
----------------------------------
 6. Ravenna                    46
 7. CuoioCappiano              45
 8. Forlì                      44
 9. Fano                       43
10. Tolentino                  43
11. Castelnuovo                40
12. Sansovino                  40
13. Aglianese                  39
----------------------------------
14. Rosetana                   38
15. Carrarese                  37
16. Imolese                    36                Re-elected
17. Bellaria                   36                Re-elected
----------------------------------
18. Montevarchi                34                Re-elected

== Group C (South) ==
    Squadra                    Punti
 1. FROSINONE                  64                Promoted to Serie C1
----------------------------------
 2. Brindisi                   63Bankruptcy
 3. VITTORIA                   53                Promoted to Serie C1 after playoff
 4. Fidelis Andria             53Promoted to C1 by the FIGC
 5. Giugliano                  52
----------------------------------
 6. Melfi                      52
 7. Igea Virtus                51
 8. Palmese                    48Bankruptcy
 9. Nocerina                   43
10. Lodigiani Roma             40
11. Gela                       40
12. Cavese                     40
13. Latina                     40
----------------------------------
14. Isernia                    39Bankruptcy
15. Ragusa                     37
16. Castel di Sangro           34                Re-elected
17. Tivoli                     33                Relegated to Serie D after playout
----------------------------------
18. Rutigliano                 30                Relegated to Serie D

== Play-off ==
- Gir. A:
  - Pizzighettone-Cremonese 1-3; 0-3
  - Valenzana-Südtirol-Alto Adige 0-1; 0-0
    - Südtirol-Alto Adige-Cremonese 1-2; 1-2
- Gir. B:
  - Gubbio-Sangiovannese 2-1; 0-1
  - San Marino-Gualdo 1-0; 2-3
    - Gualdo-Sangiovannese 1-1; 1-3
- Gir. C:
  - Fidelis Andria-Vittoria 0-0; 1-1
  - Giugliano-Brindisi 1-2; 0-0
    - Vittoria-Brindisi 3-0; 0-1

== Play-out ==
- Girone A
  - Sassuolo-Pro Vercelli 2-1; 1-1
  - Savona-Legnano 0-0; 1-1
- Girone B
  - Bellaria Igea Marina-Rosetana 0-0; 1-1
  - Imolese-Carrarese 0-0; 0-0
- Girone C
  - Castel di Sangro-Ragusa 0-1; 3-2
  - Tivoli-Isernia 1-1; 1-1

== References and sources ==
- Almanacco Illustrato del Calcio - La Storia 1898-2004, Panini Edizioni, Modena, September 2005

Specific
