= Paganese Calcio 1926 =

Italian football club

Paganese
- Full name: Paganese Calcio 1926
- Nickname: Azzurrostellati (Light-Blue Starred)
- Founded: 1926; 100 years ago
- Ground: Stadio Marcello Torre, Pagani, Italy
- Capacity: 5,981
- Chairman: Raffaele Trapani
- Manager: Gianluca Grassadonia
- League: Serie D Group H
- 2023–24: Serie D Group H, 7th of 18
- Website: www.paganesecalcio.com
Home colours	Away colours	Third colours

Paganese Calcio 1926 is an Italian association football club from Pagani, Campania. It currently plays in Serie D.

== History ==
The club was founded in 1926.

Paganese also took part in the Anglo-Italian Cup in 1978, achieving a single victory and three defeats.

The club won Serie D/H in 2005–2006 and have thus won promotion to Serie C2 for the 2006–2007 season. A second consecutive promotion in the Serie C2 competition of 2006–07, after defeating SPAL and Reggiana in the playoffs, gave Paganese the right to play in Serie C1 in the 2007–08 season, their first appearance in the division since 1979.

At the end of the 2010–11 Lega Pro Prima Divisione season the club was relegated to Lega Pro Seconda Divisione.

In the 2011–12 of Lega Pro Seconda Divisione season, the club was immediately promoted to Lega Pro Prima Divisione, beating Chieti 2–0 in the first round of final play-off followed by 0–0 in the return.

== Current squad ==
As of 22 December 2023

Note: Flags indicate national team as defined under FIFA eligibility rules; some limited exceptions apply. Players may hold more than one non-FIFA nationality.

No.	Pos.	Nation	Player
1	GK	ITA	Mario Pinestro
2	DF	ITA	Stefano Celentano (on loan from Juve Stabia)
4	MF	ITA	Christian De Gennaro
5	MF	ITA	Francesco De Feo
6	DF	ITA	Gioacchino Galeotafiore
8	MF	ITA	Matteo Langella
10	FW	ITA	Antonio Orefice
11	FW	ITA	Leonardo Trezza
13	MF	ITA	Simone Caruso
14	MF	ITA	Giuseppe Ianniello (on loan from Casertana)
15	MF	ITA	Antonio Del Gesso
16	DF	ITA	Carmine Setola
18	MF	ITA	Alessandro Criscuolo
19	MF	ITA	Giuseppe Faiello
20	FW	ITA	Andrea Mancino

No.	Pos.	Nation	Player
21	MF	ITA	Simone Mastrocinque
22	GK	ITA	Simone Esposito
23	MF	ITA	Umberto Seghetta
24	FW	ITA	Alessio Porzio
25	DF	ITA	Giovanni Parisi
26	DF	ITA	Simone Rocca
27	FW	ITA	Carmine Iannone
28	DF	ITA	Giuseppe Esposito
28	FW	ITA	Antonio Perulli (on loan from Salernitana)
30	FW	ITA	Felice Simonetti
31	FW	ITA	Nunzio Boiano
33	FW	ITA	Luca Matarese
52	DF	ITA	Gennaro Donnarumma
—	MF	ITA	Salvatore Montoro (on loan from San Marzano)

== Former players ==
- (New Caledonia) Vincent Taua
