= ASD Atletico Elmas =

Italian football club

Atletico Elmas
- Full name: Associazione Sportiva Dilettantistica Atletico Elmas
- Founded: 2010
- Ground: Stadio Edoardo Sanna, Elmas, Italy
- Chairman: Antonio Orrù
- Manager: Paolo Busanca
- League: Promozione Sardinia
- 2011–12: Eccellenza Sardinia, 15th
| Home colours | Away colours |

Associazione Sportiva Dilettantistica Atletico Elmas is an Italian association football club located in Elmas, Sardinia. It currently plays in Promozione Sardinia.

== History ==
A.S.D. Atletico Elmas was founded in the summer 2010 after the merger between A.S.D. Atletico Decimomannu (club of Eccellenza Sardinia) and Polisportiva Elmas (club of Prima Categoria Sardinia).

In the summer 2012 it didn't join 2012–13 Eccellenza and was relegated to Promozione.

=== The origins ===
The origins of the club go back to 1963 when was founded Atletico Cagliari that was renamed initially Atletico Sirio in 1996 and subsequently Atletico Elmas in 1998. The club has played a total of ten years in Serie D: from 1996–97 to 1999–2000 and from 2001–02 to 2006–07.

In the summer 2008 the former Atletico Elmas merged with Decimese Aurora & Decimo founding A.S.D. Atletico Decimomannu.

== Colors and badge ==
Its colors are white, yellow and green.

== Honours ==
- Eccellenza Sardinia:
  - Winner (2): 1995–96, 2000–01
- Coppa Italia Sardinia:
  - Winner (2): 1995–96, 2000–01
