= AC Belluno 1905 =

Italian football club

Belluno
- Full name: Associazione Calcio Belluno 1905 s.r.l.
- Nickname(s): Gialloblù (Yellow-Blue)
- Founded: 1905
- Dissolved: 2021
- Ground: Stadio Comunale Polisportivo, Belluno, Italy
- Capacity: 2,585
- Chairman: Alberto Lazzari
- Manager: Stefano De Agostini
- League: Serie D/C
- 2020–21: 9th
Home colours	Away colours

Associazione Calcio Belluno 1905 was an Italian association football club located in Belluno, Veneto.

== History ==
The club was founded in 1905.

=== Serie C ===
It has played 9 seasons in Serie C and 2 in Serie C2.

It was relegated from Serie C2 in 2003–04 to Serie D, where it played until 2021, when the club was dissolved.

== Colors and badge ==
Its colors are yellow and blue.
