= FBC Calangianus 1905 =

Italian football club

Calangianus
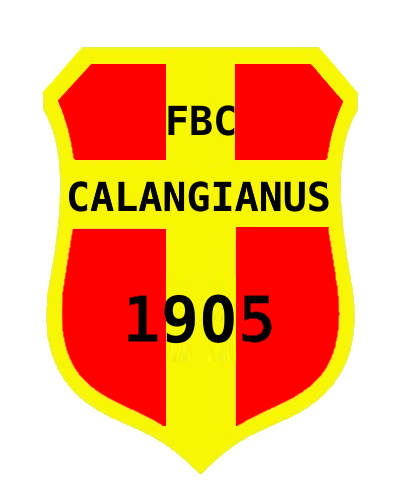
- Full name: Foot-Ball Club Calangianus; 1905
- Founded: 1905
- Ground: Stadio Signora Chiara, Calangianus, Italy
- Capacity: 3,500
- Chairman: Vittorio Lissia
- League: Eccellenza Sardinia
Home colours	Away colours	Third colours

Foot-Ball Club Calangianus 1905 is an Italian association football club located in Calangianus, Sardinia. They currently play in Eccellenza Sardinia and wear red and yellow.

== History ==
Football Club Calangianus 1905 is the Sardinian club with the most appearances in the fourth level of the Italian league (39). In addition, Calangianus is one of the oldest clubs in Italy and in Sardinia. It's considered the oldest in Sardinia, because it has never found a failure.

== Supporters ==
The group in support of Calangianus are "Brigate Giallorosse", it was born in 1987 and it is one of the main in Sardinia. The group, made up increasingly by hundreds of people, supports for two decades a twinning with the fans of Olbia and maintains friendships with the fans of Nuoro, Carbonia, La Maddalena and Cagliari. Now, the group "Gioventù Ultras Calangianus 2015" is the principal supporters' group in Calangianus. The main rivals of Calangianus fans are the fans of Tempio and Torres.
