= Olbia Calcio 1905 =

Italian football club

Olbia
- Full name: Olbia Calcio
- Nickname: I Bianchi (The All-Whites)
- Founded: 1905; 121 years ago
- Ground: Stadio Bruno Nespoli
- Capacity: 3,209
- Chairman: Guido Surace
- Manager: Giancarlo Favarin
- League: Serie D
- 2023–24: Serie C Group B, 20th of 20 (relegated)
- Website: www.olbiacalcio.com
Home colours	Away colours	Third colours

Olbia Calcio, commonly referred to as Olbia, is an Italian football club based in the city of Olbia. It plays in Serie D, the fourth division of the Italian football league system.

Founded in 1906 (although its birth is traditionally traced back to 1905), it was refounded in 2010 following the exclusion decreed by the Federal Council of the FIGC due to bankruptcy for financial reasons.

Since its foundation, it has won nine championships, including a Serie D Scudetto in 2002.

The club colour is white, while the identifying symbols are the ship and the island of Tavolara. It plays its home matches at the Stadio Bruno Nespoli.

== History ==
The white logo as Olbia Calcio

=== Foundation ===
The birth of the city's first football club has been uncertain. Still, according to local chronicles, it was conceived in 1905, more precisely towards the end of that year and the beginning of the following one, in the then Terranova Pausania. According to an article in La Nuova Sardegna of that day, it was founded on 12 January 1906 as the Società Ginnastica Olbia, founded by a Sassarese athlete, Egidio Serra. The article at the time, written by Franco Sardo, lists the first board of directors with Agostino Amucano as president.

According to the sources, the 20 June 1912, there was a match between the club's boys, refereed by Paolino Macera of Andrea Doria. The first official game was L.C. (Liberi Calciatori) Terranovese against Audax Calangianus, which ended 2–0 for Olbia on 24 August 1924. Then, in the 1924–25 season, the Galluresi were runners-up in the Torneo Sardegna. On 4 November 1924, it took place the first derby between Torres and the then Terranovese to celebrate the 21st anniversary of Torres. The Sassaresi won 2–1 The game between Olbia and Torres, known as the Derby del Nord Sardegna, is the most played derby on the island, with more than 100 matches. It is a fierce rivalry between both fans.

The official return to the fields and the competitive resumption at the federal level took place in the 1938–1939 season under the name G.I.L. Terranova, where the boys, led by coach-player Salvatore Satta known as "Menelik", obtained their first historic promotion to Serie C by winning the Sardinian First Division thanks to the goals of top scorer Flavio Piras and the other members of the team formed by: Spano A., Jodice, Piccaredda G.M., Dejana, Satta, Pulina, Piro C., Picciaredda F., Piras, Crola and Careddu, Aloia, Pittalis.

The fledgling G.I.L. Olbia's first season in Serie C, with Gesuino Sardo as president and Mario De Palma on the bench, was not too fortunate. In fact, after the first victory in Serie C (1–0) against Stabia, a series of defeats followed, which led to the Sardinian First Division, after just one year, remaining there for three consecutive seasons until the suspension of the championships due to the Second World War.

=== From after World War II to the 1970s ===
After suspending sporting activities because of the war, in the summer of 1947, the bianchi played again in Serie C, finishing in 6th place. Still, due to financial difficulties, they renounced registration at the end of the season, deciding to restart from the Sardinian First Division.

In the 1948–1949 Sardinian First Division, Olbia was relegated at the end of a season of passion, remaining agonistically inactive for two seasons. However, the football activity continued locally, thanks to a group of local youngsters represented by Mariano Spano, Tonino Varrucciu and Bruno Garrucciu.

After the period of inactivity, the turning point came at the end of the 1951–1952 Sardinian First Division with the arrival of Italian world champion Gino Colaussi. He ended his career as a player, playing seven matches and scoring one goal during the championship. Then he began his career as a coach. The following year, Olbia was promoted to Serie D. Thanks to Colaussi on the bench, young promises like Gustavo Giagnoni were launched. At Olbia, he played 77 matches with 23 goals before launching his successful career as a player and coach at the highest level.

Subsequently, Olbia reached first place in 1956–1957 and returned to the Interregional Championship, later renamed Serie D.

Fifteen years later, between Serie D and a brief, successful experience in the Sardinian First Division in 1963–1964, in 1968, Olbia played Serie C for the third time, under the presidency of Elio Pintus and Paolo 'Palleddu' Degortes on the bench. After winning the group F of Serie D, the club returned to the professional ranks after an absence of twenty years thanks to the goals of Benvenuto Misani, Selleri and the saves of Bettella.

=== From the 1970s to the bankruptcy and present day ===
In the 1985–1986 season, Olbia was promoted to Serie C2. During the years played in Serie C and then in the downgraded Serie C2, after the departure of Elio Pintus at the helm of the club in 1981 and the alternation of various presidents, the whites stabilised between the third and fourth professional divisions, achieving their best result with a 4th place in the 1993–1994 Serie C2. In the 2000–01 season, the club won its most important title, the Scudetto Dilettanti. Then, in the years to come, Olbia alternated between Serie D and Serie C before returning to the Eccellenza, the Sardinian First Division.

Olbia restarted from the Sardinian Eccellenza due to financial problems. It changed management and name after the coming of the Brescian entrepreneur Franco Rusconi, who took over the club in 2007, leading it to good results in Serie C2 and reaching the playoffs in 2008–2009.

After three seasons in the top regional division and a bankruptcy in 2010, and thanks to the restart in Eccellenza with a group of former players and Pino Scanu as president, Olbia returned to Serie D.

In the 2014–2015 Serie D, the club went close to promotion to the Lega Pro, finishing in 3rd place after Lupa Castelli Romani and Viterbese, losing with the latter the play-off final in the G group.

On 30 November 2015, after five years that Pino Scanu taking the club back to Eccellenza after financial problems, Alessandro Marino was appointed as the new president. Marino was a professor of strategy at LUISS University until the previous year in the CDA of Cagliari and vice president of the Fluorsid.

On the field, Olbia climbed from ninth to fifth place, ending the league with 62 points, tied with Rieti and Torres, respectively, fourth and third place by better positioning in the league. The Olbia thus detached the ticket for the play-off that won with authority by conquering the fields of Grosseto (semi-final) and Torres (final). The victory in Sassari, the first in 22 years, brought great enthusiasm to the city[9] and allowed Olbia to be admitted to the 2016–2017 Lega Pro.

On 4 August, following the decisions taken by the Federal Council of the FIGC, Olbia was officially reinstated in Lega Pro group A, thus returning to play a third-level after 38 years.

In the 2023–24 season, Olbia played in group B of Serie C, the third level of the Italian football league system. They were relegated after finishing last in the group.

== Players ==
=== Current squad ===
As of 1 February 2024

Note: Flags indicate national team as defined under FIFA eligibility rules; some limited exceptions apply. Players may hold more than one non-FIFA nationality.

No.	Pos.	Nation	Player
—	GK	NED	Maarten van der Want
—	GK	NED	Rosario Rizzitano
—	DF	ITA	Luca La Rosa
—	DF	ITA	Cristian Anelli
—	DF	ITA	Stefano Pani
—	DF	ITA	Federico Zanchetta
—	DF	ITA	Angelo Mameli
—	DF	ITA	Christian Arboleda
—	DF	ITA	Nicolas Rizzi
—	DF	ITA	Andrea Schiavone
—	MF	ITA	Simone Pastorello

No.	Pos.	Nation	Player
—	MF	ITA	Nicolò Costaggiu
18	MF	BAN	Fahamedul Islam
—	MF	ITA	Lorenzo De Grazia
—	MF	ITA	Alex Caddeo
—	MF	ITA	Exequiel Narese
—	MF	ITA	Gianmarco Staffa
—	MF	SUI	Stefano Guidotti
—	MF	ITA	Nicolò Maspero
—	MF	ITA	Cristian Totti
—	FW	ITA	Pasquale Costanzo
—	FW	ITA	Riccardo Santi
—	FW	ITA	Massimiliano Gennari

== Colours and symbols ==
=== Name ===
When the Società Ginnastica Olbia was founded, the town was still called Terranova. The name would only be changed in 1939 by royal decree. The choice of the name Olbia was part of a period of rediscovery and vindication of local identity, as exemplified by the birth of clubs such as Amsicora and Eleonora d'Arborea in Cagliari, Tharros in Oristano, SEF Torres 1903 or Iosto in Sassari.

=== Colours ===
The traditional colour of the Gallura-based club is white, from which the nickname Bianchi is taken to identify Olbia's footballers. On the occasion of the first derby with Torres - played in 1924 – Olbia wore a maroon shirt. Moreover, in the early 1920s, the U.S. Terranovese wore red and white shirts. The affixing of the four Moors, the symbol of the island, on the game uniforms also dates back to that period.

=== Coat of arms ===
The club's coat of arms, changed over the years, has always been characterised by the trireme ship and island of Tavolara, part of the municipality of Olbia in the Gallura sub-region. Occasionally, in some versions, the image of the four Moors has found its place.

The current logo debuted in February 2016. It is reminiscent of Cagliari's; a triangular shield encloses a ship, no longer a trireme, on whose sail the four Moors appear. In the emerald green background, the silhouette of Tavolara, black, stands out. The name 'Olbia' and the date of foundation, 1905, are also present. Although more suited to modern marketing canons, the coat of arms has met with disapproval from a fringe of fans as it deviates from past traditions.

=== Anthem ===
The first anthem made official was Olè, Olbia olè, which paid homage to an old battle chorus/hymn shouted by the warmest fans in the 1970s. In 2017 the new anthem, Terranoa, made its debut.

== Honours ==
=== Italian titles ===
==== Leagues ====
- Serie D (Tier 4):
  - Winners (2): 1967–68 Group F, 1974–75 Group F
  - Third-place (1): 2014–15 Group G
- Scudetto Dilettanti (Tier 5):
  - Winners (1): 2001–02
- Campionato Interregionale / Serie D (Tier 5):
  - Winners (3): 1982–83 Group N, 1985–86 Group N, 2001–02 Group B
  - Third-place (1): 1981–82 Group N

==== Cups ====
- Coppa Cossu-Mariotti:
  - Winners (1): 1966–67, 1974–75

=== Sardinian titles ===
==== Leagues ====
- Campionato Sardo ULIC / Prima Divisione / Promozione / Prima Categoria / Eccellenza (Tier 1):
  - Winners (6): 1930–31, 1938–39 Group B, 1952–53, 1956–57, 1963–64, 2012–13
  - Runners-up (4): 1941–42, 1942–43, 1954–55, 2011–12
  - Third-place (1): 1955–56 Group N

==== Cups ====
- Sardinian Cup:
  - Runners-up (1): 2012–13
