= Arzachena Academy Costa Smeralda =

Italian football club

Arzachena
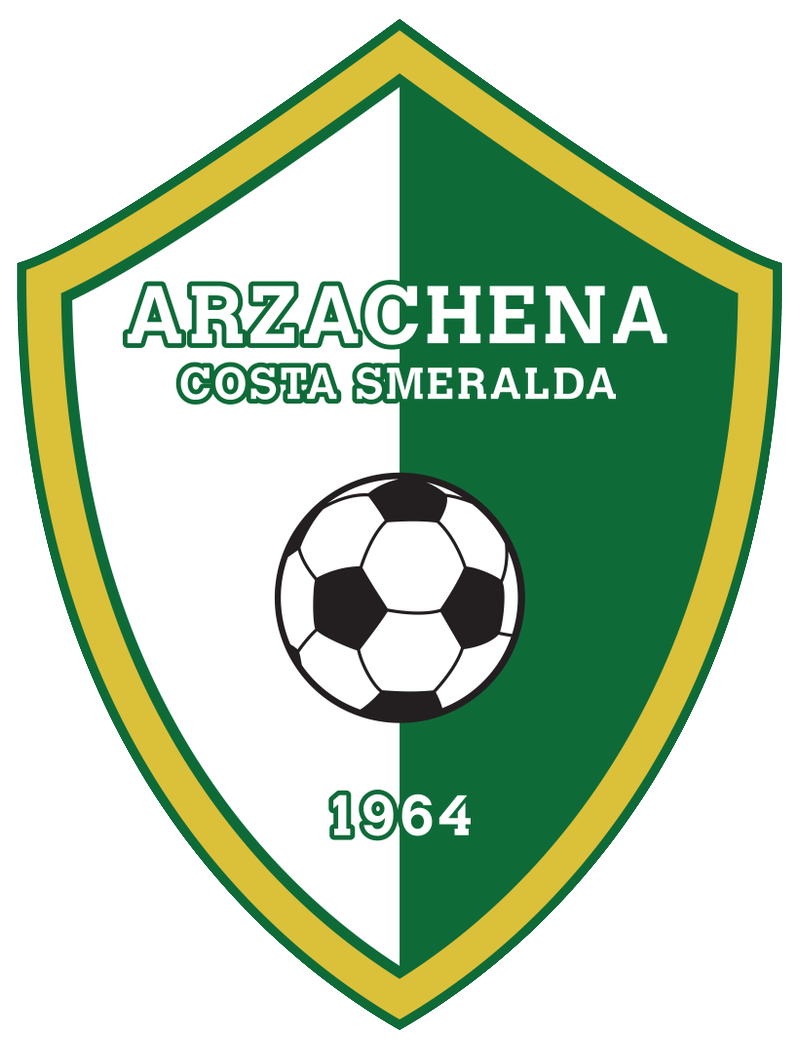
- Full name: Arzachena Academy Costa Smeralda
- Founded: 1964; 61 years ago
- Ground: Stadio Biagio Pirina, Arzachena, Italy
- Capacity: 3,100
- Chairman: Gabriele Volpi
- Manager: Mauro Giorico
- League: Promozione
- Website: http://www.arzachenacalcio.it/
| Home colours | Away colours |

Arzachena Academy Costa Smeralda is an Italian association football club located in Arzachena, Sardinia. The club currently play in Promozione, the sixth tier of Italian football.

== History ==
The club was founded in 1964.

In the season 2002–2003 the club was promoted to Serie D and won promotion to Serie C as Group G champions in the 2016–17 Serie D season.

The club was liquidated in 2019 due to financial issues, and refounded that same year under the ownership of entrepreneur and Spezia majority stakeholder Gabriele Volpi, restarting from Serie D. After four seasons in the fourth tier, the club voluntarily dropped out of that level and entered the seventh-tier Prima Categoria for the 2023–24 season, earning promotion to the sixth-tier Promozione for the 2024–25 season.

== Colours and badge ==
The colors of the club are white and green.
