= Polisportiva Alghero =

Italian football club

Alghero
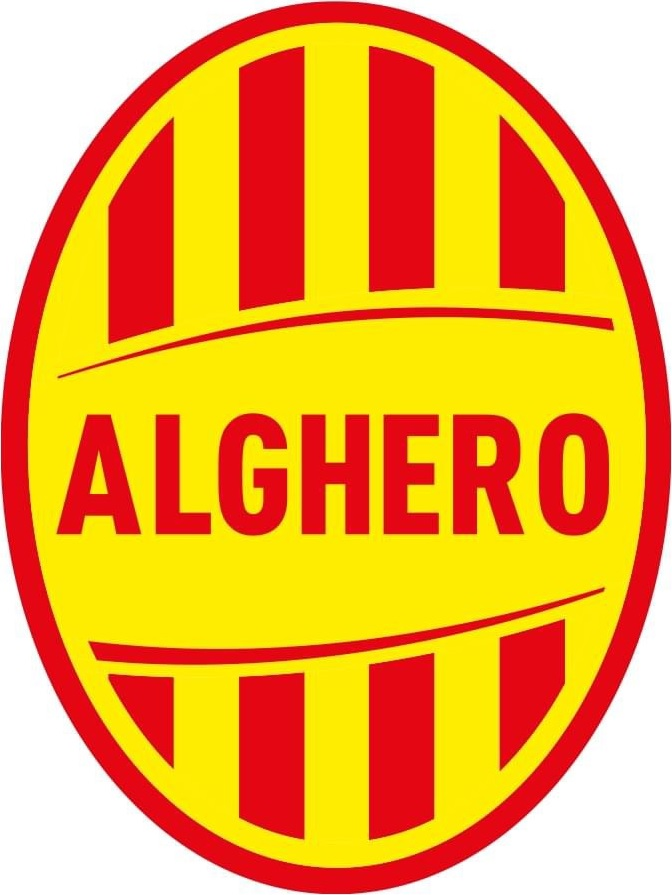
- Full name: Alghero Calcio
- Founded: 1945
- Dissolved: 2010
- Ground: Stadio Mariotti, Alghero, Italy
- Capacity: 5,000
- Chairman: Andrea Pinna
- Manager: Mario Fadda
- League: Eccellenza
Home colours	Away colours

Alghero Calcio is an Italian association football club located in Alghero, Sardinia. Its colours is red and yellow.

In the 2007–08 season of Serie D, Alghero finished 4th in Girone G, qualifying it for the promotional play-offs. As a playoff semi-finalist, the team won special promotion to Serie C2, now called Lega Pro Seconda Divisione, as one of the 5 top teams in the promotional play-offs.

In the Lega Pro Seconda Divisione 2008-09 season, the team finished tied with Montichiari for 13th position in Girone A, but avoided playing in the relegation play-offs by having the better head-to-head record.

Following bankruptcy in 2010, Alghero subsequently folded.

== Honours ==
- Eccellenza Sardinia: 2003–04
