= USD Nuorese Calcio 1930 =

Italian football club

Nuorese
- Full name: Unione Sportiva Dilettantistica; Nuorese Calcio 1930
- Nickname(s): Verdeazzurri (Greenblues)
- Founded: 1930; 2008 (refounded)
- Ground: Stadio Franco Frogheri, Nuoro, Italy
- Capacity: 7,000
- Chairman: Gianni Pittorra
- Manager: Luca Rusani
- League: Promozione Sardinia B
- 2022–23: Eccellenza Sardinia, 16th (relegated)
Home colours	Away colours

U.S.D. Nuorese Calcio 1930, commonly known as Nuorese, are an Italian association football club from Nuoro, Sardinia, founded in 1930. The club was known as A.S. Nuorese Calcio until 2006, and F.C. Nuorese Calcio from 2006 to 2008.

The colours of the team are blue and green.

== History ==
Nuorese has a long history of playing in Serie C2 and top amateur leagues and also featured a young Gianfranco Zola during the 1980s.

In 2004 the club, then playing in the Eccellenza league, was acquired by former Torino chairman Roberto Goveani, with the aim to lead the Verdeazzurri back into professionalism. Under Goveani, and under the captaincy of former Cagliari mainstay Gianluca Festa, Nuorese promptly won two promotions in a row, being crowned Eccellenza Sardinia champions in 2004–05 and Serie D – Girone B winners in 2005–06, thus returning to play in Serie C2 the following season.

Playing in Serie C2/A in 2006–07, Nuorese finished in fourth place, then losing the promotion playoff semifinal round to third-placed Pergocrema, 3–1 on aggregate.

Nuorese played again in Serie C2/A for the 2007–08 season, finishing the season in eighth place; however, due to its failure to present proper documentation to confirm their football membership, the club was dropped from professional leagues for the 2008–09 season. Nuorese was successively admitted to play amateur, regionally based Promozione league in 2008–09.

Noted players who spent days at Nuorese include Pietro Paolo Virdis, Gianfranco Zola and, more recently, Gianluca Festa and former Belgium international Luis Oliveira.
