= ASD Football Club Matese =

Italian football club

F.C. Matese
- Full name: Associazione Sportiva Dilettantistica Football Club Matese
- Nicknames: I Biancoverde (The White-and-Green); I Verdeoro (The Green-and-Golds); I Lupi Matesini (The Wolves of Matese)
- Founded: 6 June 2020; 6 years ago
- Ground: Stadio Pasqualino Ferrante
- Capacity: 1,500
- President: Carmine Matera
- Manager: Felice Rea
- League: Eccellenza Molise
- 2025–26: Eccellenza Molise, 2nd of 16
- Website: https://fcmatese.it
Home colours	Away colours

Associazione Sportiva Dilettantistica Football Club Matese, commonly referred to as F.C. Matese (Italian pronunciation: [assotʃatˈtsjoːne sporˈtiːva dilettanˈtistika ˈfutbol klab maˈteːze]; also stylised as FC Matese), is a football club based in Sepicciano, a frazione of Piedimonte Matese, in Campania, Southern Italy. The club competes in the Molise division of the Eccellenza, the fifth tier of the Italian football league system, following relegation from Serie D in the 2023–24 season.

== History ==
=== A History of Sport in Piedimonte Matese (Piedimonte d'Alife) ===
Sport in the modern era in Piedimonte Matese (known until 1970 as Piedimonte d'Alife) traces its roots back to Pro Piedimonte, a multi-sports club founded in 1928. Football was one of three sports practised by the club, alongside running and tug-of-war. The club’s first president was Erminio Tedesco. Spanning four decades, Pro Piedimonte remained active well into the 1960s.

== Founding of A.S.D. Football Club Matese ==
F.C. Matese was founded on the morning of 6 June 2020 from the merger of Eccellenza clubs A.S.D. Comprensorio Vairano (from Vairano Patenora) and A.S.D. Tre Pini Matese (from Piedimonte Matese). The team's name, Football Club Matese, is often shortened to F.C. Matese and is sometimes written as FC Matese. The new team was admitted to Serie D for the 2020–21 season, retaining the "Matese" part of its club name and making no acknowledgement of Comprensorio Vairano. Stadio Pasqualino Ferrante, formerly home to both Tre Pini Matese and fellow club F.W.P. Matese, was chosen as F.C. Matese's home venue.

=== Serie D ===
==== Inaugural campaign: 2020–21 season ====
F.C. Matese's first-ever league fixture was an away match at Olympia Agnonese on 27 September 2020. The visitors were off to a flying start when Portuguese forward Leonardo Abreu scored to break the deadlock after six minutes. Corrado Urbano's side took a commanding three-goal lead before the half-hour mark, scoring twice in the space of two minutes, with goals from Italian forward Antonio Negro, and Leo Abreu volleyed home his second to make it 0–3 at half-time. Italian midfielder Manél Minicucci netted F.C. Matese's fourth after 78 minutes to claim the club's first-ever win in Serie D. Following the club's comprehensive 0–4 away victory over Olympia Agnonese, F.C. Matese would lose their next two matches against Atletico Terme Fiuggi (2–3) and Montegiorgio Calcio (2–0), respectively. After a two-game losing streak, the club managed a 0–0 draw with Aprilia. Corrado Urbano's side then suffered a succession of defeats, losing 4–0 away to Città di Campobasso, 1–3 at home to Castelfidardo, 1–2 at home versus Castelnuovo Vomano, and 3–1 away to Cynthialbalonga. F.C. Matese returned to winning ways with a first home victory and only their second of the season, coming in a 3–0 win over Vastese at Stadio Pasqualino Ferrante, ending their four-game losing streak. However, the team's winning run lasted just one match, as F.C. Matese fell to a 3–1 away defeat against Notaresco. After ten matches, F.C. Matese had recorded two wins, one draw and six defeats, giving them just 7 points, leaving them in the bottom half of the table. However, a change in fortunes saw the club approach the midway point of the season in a steady position with 18 points, following three successive wins, two draws and one defeat, taking their tally to five wins, three draws, and eight losses for the first half of the season. F.C. Matese built upon their mid-season form, managing a 0–0 home draw against Rieti, a second win over Olympia Agnonese, and their first victory against Atletico Terme Fiuggi.

==== Promotion play-offs ====
In its inaugural season (2020–21), under the management of Corrado Urbano, F.C. Matese recorded a fifth-place finish in the league, amassing 56 points after 34 games, leaving them tied on points with two other teams: third-placed Pineto and fourth-placed Cynthialbalonga. It meant that F.C. Matese had qualified for the Serie D promotion play-offs. However, as all three sides had finished on the same number of points, the play-off matches were decided on "Head-to-head", with Pineto scoring 6, Cynthialbalonga 5, and Matese 4. Consequently, F.C. Matese were drawn against the second-placed team, Notaresco, with the match being played on 23 June 2021 at Notaresco's Stadio Comunale Vincenzo Savini. After trailing 1–0 at half-time, courtesy of a goal from Notaresco midfielder Mattia Frulla in the 21st minute, the Matesini were reduced to ten men after defender Luigi Setola was sent off for a second yellow card with just under 20 minutes left to play of regulation time. F.C. Matese lost the semi-final 1–0, sending Notaresco through to the play-off final against eventual winners Pineto.

==== 2021–22 season ====
On 7 August 2021, it was announced that F.C. Matese would participate in the 2021–22 edition of the Coppa Italia Serie D, thus making their debut in the competition. Making their debut in the competition, they were handed a home tie against Vastogirardi. Unfortunately for Matese, they would be eliminated in the first round of the Coppa Italia Serie D, losing 1–3.

==== 2022–23 season ====
On 21 August 2022, Matese were drawn away to Barletta in the preliminary round of the competition, losing 1–0.

==== 2023–24 season ====
On 3 September 2023, Matese were drawn away to Real Casalnuovo in the first round of the competition, losing 0–3. The first victory of the season came on matchday 4 at home against Atletico Ascoli, followed by wins against Tivoli and Roma City (formerly Atletico Terme Fiuggi) before away defeats against Alma Juventus Fano and Sora.

== Colours and crest ==
F.C. Matese's colours are green and gold, symbolising both the agricultural fields and the Matese mountains. The club's circular badge features a gold outer band, followed by a thinner white ring and a third green ring, resembling a ring doughnut. These rings encase a white centre depicting the silhouette of a howling wolf standing atop a summit and gazing up at a spherical object. There are also two gold (sometimes white) stars and the Latin inscription "Duc in Altum", which translates to "Put Out Into The Deep", and MCMXXXV (the year 1935), in Roman numerals.

== Sponsorship and kit manufacturers ==
Italian sportswear supplier Givova produces their kit. From 2020 to 2021 to 2022–23 their shirt sponsor was Ponte Reale, an Italian company that manufactures Buffalo mozzarella cheese. Since 2023–24, FAAM have sponsored the team's kits.

Period	Kit manufacturer	Shirt sponsor
2020–	Givova	FAAM (currently) Ponte Reale (formerly)

== Players ==
=== Current squad ===
As of 13 August 2026

Note: Flags indicate national team as defined under FIFA eligibility rules; some limited exceptions apply. Players may hold more than one non-FIFA nationality.

No.	Pos.	Nation	Player
—	GK	ITA	Ciro Vivace
—	DF	POL	Gracjan Szyszka
—	DF	ITA	Antonio Riccio
—	DF	ITA	Emilio Garzia
—	DF	GHA	Lord Joel Martey
—	MF	ITA	Emanuele Setola
—	MF	ITA	Alessio Langellotti

No.	Pos.	Nation	Player
—	MF	ITA	Mattia Carriola
—	MF	ITA	Christian De Rosa
—	MF	ITA	Roberto Del Mondo
—	FW	SEN	David Gueye
—	FW	ITA	Antonio Signorelli
—	FW	ITA	Daniele Napoletano
—	FW	ITA	Stefano Mone

=== Out on loan ===
Note: Flags indicate national team as defined under FIFA eligibility rules; some limited exceptions apply. Players may hold more than one non-FIFA nationality.

No. / Pos. / Nation / Player; — / / / (on loan at insert team name)	No. / Pos. / Nation / Player

=== Former players ===
- (Portugal) Léo Abreu
- (Italy) Edoardo Adamo
- (Ghana) Jonathan Adusa
- (Italy) Pellegrino Albanese
- (Argentina) Luis Alfageme
- (Italy) Alessandro Andreassi
- (Italy) Francesco Apredda
- (Italy) Angelo Azzara
- (Italy) Luciano Ballarino
- (Italy) Lorenzo Ballerini
- (Italy) Antonio Barbato
- (Italy) Mario Barone
- (Italy) Giovanni Blando
- (Netherlands) Chernet Boersma
- (Italy) Gennaro Boiano
- (Italy) Andrea Bracaglia
- (Italy) Stefano Bruno
- (Argentina) Santiago Budano
- (Italy) Raffaele Buonocore
- (Italy) Luigi Calemme
- (Italy) Antonio Calvanese
- (Italy) Daniele Camorani
- (Italy) Domenico Cantelmo
- (Italy) Alessandro Carnevale
- (Italy) Luca Cassese
- (Italy) Lorenzo Castaldo
- (Italy) Ciccio Catania
- (Argentina) Gaston Cesani
- (Italy) Pietro Ciaramella
- (Italy) Aniello Ciaravolo
- (Italy) Giancarlo Di Cillo
- (Italy) Nicola Ciotola
- (Italy) Alessandro Codella
- (Italy) Michele Collocolo
- (Italy) Andrea Congiu
- (Italy) Stefano Costantino
- (Italy) Alessandro Crispino
- (Italy) Alessio D'Andrea
- (Italy) Piergiorgio Delicato
- (Portugal) Carlos Djaló
- (Italy) Mario Esposito
- (Italy) Vittorio Esposito
- (Italy) Raffaele Fabiano
- (Italy) Salvatore Federico
- (Italy) Roberto Felici
- (Argentina) Juan Bautista Ferrer
- (Italy) Andrea Filosa
- (Italy) Antonino Fusco
- (Italy) Alex Gagliardini
- (Argentina) Luis Fabián Galesio
- (Italy) Antonio La Gamba
- (Italy) Marco Del Giudice
- (Senegal) Kalagna Gomis
- (Italy) Francesco Governali
- (Italy) Vincenzo Guarino
- (Morocco) Ayoub Hefiane
- (Italy) Filippo Iacovoni
- (Italy) Pasquale Iadaresta
- (Italy) Loris Iannetta
- (Portugal) Jardel
- (Slovakia) Aleksander Kuzmanović
- (Italy) Francesco Leonetti
- (Italy) Vincenzo Liccardi
- (Greece) Fialbi Lleshi
- (Italy) Francesco De Lucia
- (Italy) Giuseppe De Lucia
- (Italy) Pasquale Di Lullo
- (Italy) Salvatore Manfrellotti
- (Italy) Francesco De Marco
- (Italy) Alessandro Marcucci
- (Italy) Gianmarco Mariconda
- (Italy) Samuel Martino
- (Italy) Vincenzo Masi
- (Italy) Paolo Masotta
- (Italy) Raffaele Di Matteo
- (Italy) Pasquale Mauro
- (Italy) Raffaele Megaro
- (Albania) Qamil Mema
- (Italy) Aldo Minasi
- (Italy) Manél Minicucci
- (Italy) Damiano Modesto
- (Italy) Christian Mulè
- (Italy) Daniele Napoletano
- (Italy) Antonio Negro
- (Italy) Vittorio Nocerino
- (Italy) Luca Orlando
- (Italy) Badr El Ouazni
- (Italy) Mattia Palombo
- (Italy) Francesco Palumbo
- (Liberia) Abubaka Morris Passewe
- (Argentina) Fabricio Ponzo
- (Italy) Lorenzo Poverini
- (Italy) Alessandro Rabini
- (Italy) Antonio Reda
- (Italy) Vincenzo Ricamato
- (Italy) Walter Ricci
- (Italy) Luca Ricciardi
- (Italy) Paolo Riggio
- (Italy) Ruben Rinaldini
- (Italy) Vincenzo Rodi
- (Italy) Carmine Romano
- (Italy) Alessandro Rossi
- (Italy) Alessandro Russo
- (Italy) Liberato Russo
- (France) M'Paly Sacko
- (Italy) Cosimo Salatino
- (Italy) Gabriel Santoni
- (Italy) Gabriele Scacco
- (Italy) Gabriele Scaletta
- (Italy) Danilo Schettini
- (Italy) Luigi Setola
- (Albania) Klejvis Shiba
- (Italy) Francesco Siena
- (Italy) Luca Del Signore
- (Italy) Samuele Sorrentino
- (Italy) Andrea Straforini
- (Italy) Vincenzo Tommasone
- (Italy) Pompeo Tretola
- (Italy) Pietro Tribelli
- (Italy) Carlo Valentino
- (Italy) Nicola Vecchio
- (Italy) Nicola Del Vecchio
- (Canada) Damianos Verzamanis
- (Slovenia) Kristjan Vodopivec
- (Italy) Aka Yankey

=== Player records ===
Most goals Luis Fabián Galesio – 26 : 2020–21, 2021–22

Most goals in one season Luis Fabián Galesio – : 15 : 2020–21

=== Management and staff ===
Position	Name
President	(Italy) Carmine Matera
Vice president	(Italy) Marcellino Pepe
General director	(Italy) Carlo Loffreda
Secretary	(Italy) Simone Fiore
Sports director	(Italy) Raffaele Corsale
Team manager	(Italy) Antonio Di Tora
Manager	(Italy) Felice Rea
Assistant coach / Goalkeeping coach	(Italy) Silvano Romagnini
Assistant Goalkeeping coach	(Italy) Luigi Di Lullo
Athletic trainer	(Italy) Fabio Maglione

Position	Name
Press officer	(Italy) Ernesto di Girolamo
Team principal	(Italy) Cesare Salomone
Juniores Nazionali U19 manager	(Brazil) Elio Da Silva

==== Managers ====
- (Italy) Corrado Urbano (2020–2022)
- (Italy) Fabrizio Perrotti (2022)
- (Italy) Corrado Urbano (2022–2024)
- (Italy) Vincenzo Feola (2024)
- (Italy) Danilo De Rosa (2024–2025)
- (Italy) Roberto Savoia (2025–2026)
- (Italy) Felice Rea (2026–)

== Club records ==
Longest winning run

- 6 matches

Longest home winning streak

- 8 matches

Biggest wins

- Home
  - 4–1 against Trastevere, 5 May 2023 (Serie D)
  - 4–1 against Porto D'Ascoli (now U.S. Sambenedettese), 9 October 2022 (Serie D)
- Away
  - 4–0 against Olympia Agnonese, 27 September 2020 (Serie D)

Biggest losses

- Home
  - 3–0 against Recanatese, 8 May 2022 (Serie D)
- Away
  - 4–0 against Campobasso, 25 October 2020 (Serie D)
  - 4–0 against Recanatese, 12 December 2021 (Serie D)
