= Badr El Ouazni =

Italian footballer (born 1991)

Personal information
- Full name: Badr Eddin El Ouazni
- Date of birth: 13 November 1991 (age 34)
- Place of birth: Piedimonte Matese, Italy
- Height: 1.79 m (5 ft 10 in)
- Position: Forward

Team information
- Current team: Chieti F.C.
- Number: 14

Senior career*
Years	Team	Apps	(Gls)
2009–2010	Forza e Coraggio	20	(4)
2010–2011	Real Vortuno	10	(10)
2011–2013	Campania	35	(7)
2013–2015	Taranto	13	(3)
2013	Arzanese	7	(0)
2013–2014	San Severo	14	(1)
2014	Rieti	12	(2)
2014	Gelbison	1	(0)
2014–2015	Marcianise	13	(8)
2015–2018	Herculaneum	74	(47)
2018–2019	Juve Stabia	27	(6)
2019–2020	Cavese	14	(0)
2020	Foggia	7	(1)
2020–2021	Casarano	10	(0)
2021	Afragolese	2	(0)
2021	Lavello	16	(5)
2021	F.C. Matese	12	(6)
2021–	Chieti F.C.	??	(4)
- * Club domestic league appearances and goals as of 10:53, 1 May 2022 (UTC)

Badr Eddin El Ouazni (born 13 November 1991) is an Italian professional footballer who as a forward for Serie D club Chieti F.C. He is nicknamed Bruno, in Italy.

== Club career ==
El Ouazni has spent most of his career playing for professional and semi-professional teams in Serie D and Eccellenza. He began his career with Forza e Coraggio, followed by stints at Real Vortuno, San Severo, Rieti, Gelbison, Marcianise, and then Herculaneum where he spent three years and won the Eccellenza. He transferred to the Serie C club Juve Stabia in 2018. El Ouazni made his professional debut with Juve Stabia in a 4–0 Serie C win over Siracusa on 16 September 2018. He helped Juve Stabia win the Serie C title in his debut season. He thereafter transferred to Cavese, Foggia, and Casarano before a 2-week transfer to Afragolese that was terminated early after a change in directors. Shortly after he moved to Lavello on 5 February 2021. In July 2021, El Ouazni signed for hometown club F.C. Matese. El Ouazni was appointed captain of Matese ahead of the 2021–22 season, replacing Pellegrino Albanese, who joined Pineto in July. In doing so, he became the club's second-ever captain, following its founding in June 2020. El Ouazni registered 6 league goals for Matese, before moving to fellow Serie D side Chieti F.C. in December of that year.

== Personal life ==
Born in Italy, El Ouazni is of Moroccan descent.

== Honours ==
Herculaneum

- Eccellenza: 2015–16

Juve Stabia

- Serie C: 2018–19
