= 2020–21 Serie D =

Serie D
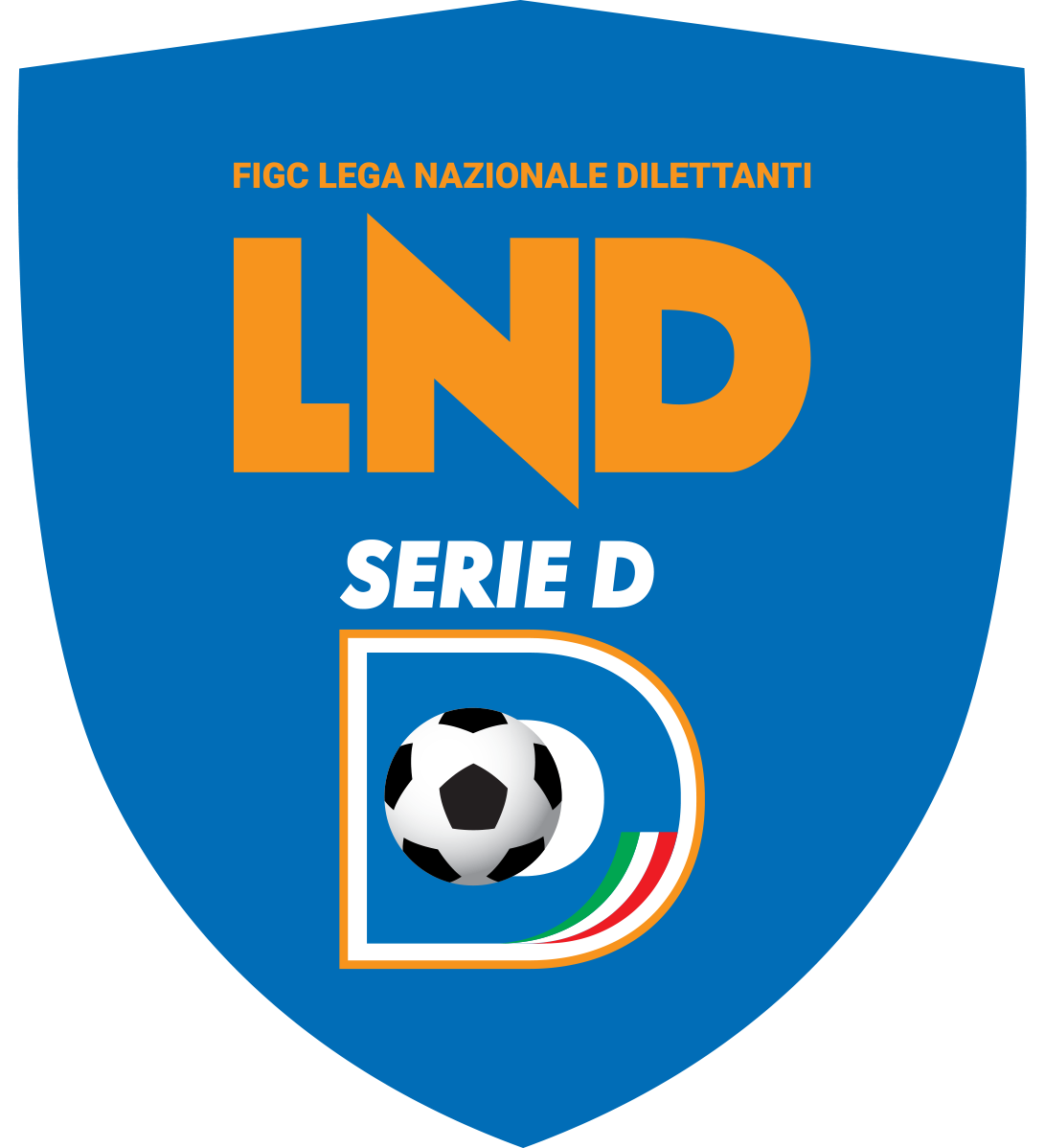
- Season: 2020–21
- Dates: 27 September 2020 – 10 July 2021
- Champions: not awarded
- Promoted: Seregno; Trento; Fiorenzuola; Montevarchi; Campobasso; Monterosi; Taranto; ACR Messina; Picerno (admitted); Siena (repechage); Latina (repechage); Fidelis Andria (repechage)
- Relegated: To Eccellenza: Scanzorosciate; Virtus Bolzano; Chions; Corticella; Grassina; Sinalunghese; Porto Sant'Elpidio; Olympia Agnonese; Puteolana; Marina di Ragusa; Roccella; Disbanded: NibionnOggiono; Real Giulianova; Savoia; Dattilo

The 2020–21 Serie D was the seventy-third edition of the top level Italian non-professional football championship. It represents the fourth tier in the Italian football league system.

== Changes from 2019–20 ==
A total 166 clubs were admitted to the season, including the new incarnation of former Serie A club Siena.

== Teams ==
The composition of the league will involve nine divisions, grouped geographically and named alphabetically.

=== Teams relegated from Serie C ===
A total of eight teams from the 2019–20 Serie C were admitted: Siena (phoenix club, admitted after the previous club's incarnation did not apply for membership), Picerno (relegated by office due to match-fixing) and the relegated teams Pianese, Gozzano, Arzignano, Rimini, Rende and Rieti.

=== Teams promoted from Eccellenza ===
Due to the COVID-19 related suspension of all amateur sports leagues in Italy, promotions were picked explicitly by the Italian Football Federation based on the leagues' provisional standings at the premature conclusion of the season. No promotion playoffs were held, nor was the final phase of the Coppa Italia Dilettanti (whose winning team is normally automatically admitted into Serie D).

Abruzzo

- Castelnuovo Vomano

Apulia

- Molfetta

Basilicata

- Lavello
- Rotonda

Calabria

- San Luca

Campania

- Afragolese
- Puteolana
- Santa Maria Cilento

Emilia Romagna

- Bagnolese
- Corticella
- Marignanese

Friuli Venezia Giulia

- Manzanese

Lazio

- Insieme Ausonia
- Montespaccato

Liguria

- Imperia
- Sestri Levante

Lombardy

- Busto 81^{1}
- Casatese
- Telgate^{2}
- Vis Nova Giussano

Marche

- Castelfidardo

Molise

- Comprensorio Vairano^{3}
- Tre Pini Matese^{3}

Piedmont & Aosta Valley

- Derthona
- PDHAE
- Saluzzo

Sardinia

- Carbonia

Sicily

- Dattilo Noir
- Paternò
- Sant'Agata

Trentino Alto Adige – Südtirol

- Trento

Tuscany

- Badesse
- Pro Livorno
- Sinalunghese

Umbria

- Tiferno Lerchi

Veneto

- Sona
- Union San Giorgio Sedico

- merged with Città di Varese
- merged with Grumellese under the new denomination of Real Calepina
- merged with Tre Pini Matese under the new denomination FC Matese

== Events ==
Due to the second wave of the COVID-19 pandemic in Italy, the Lega Nazionale Dilettanti, who is responsible for the organization of the league, decided on 5 November 2020 to suspend the regular Serie D programme until 29 November, instead using this prolonged break to reschedule all games that could not be played due to COVID-19 related health concerns.

== Girone A ==
=== League table ===
Pos	Team	Pld	W	D	L	GF	GA	GD	Pts	Promotion, qualification or relegation
1	Gozzano (C, D)	38	23	9	6	62	33	+29	78	COVID-19 extraordinary case (Note: Gozzano renounced promotion to Serie C due to financial issues. All players were released and the club was initially excluded, but was later readmitted to Serie D with a FIGC extraordinary pardon following the COVID-19 pandemic.)
2	Castellanzese (O)	38	21	8	9	83	66	+17	71	Qualification to promotion play-offs
3	PDHAE	38	20	10	8	61	41	+20	70	Qualification to promotion play-offs
4	Bra	38	20	9	9	62	36	+26	69	Qualification to promotion play-offs
5	Sanremese (Note: 2 point deducted for fielding an ineligible player during the previous season.)	38	18	13	7	57	41	+16	65	Qualification to promotion play-offs
6	Legnano	38	19	7	12	66	55	+11	64	
7	Sestri Levante	38	18	6	14	64	48	+16	60	
8	Folgore Caratese	38	15	12	11	50	43	+7	57	
9	Lavagnese	38	16	8	14	62	63	−1	56	
10	Caronnese	38	15	8	15	51	50	+1	53	
11	Imperia	38	14	7	17	43	48	−5	49	
12	Casale	38	12	12	14	42	41	+1	48	
13	Derthona	38	12	11	15	42	49	−7	47	
14	Arconatese	38	12	9	17	51	61	−10	45	
15	Chieri	38	10	14	14	45	42	+3	44	
16	Città di Varese	38	10	12	16	39	44	−5	42	
17	Saluzzo	38	8	13	17	31	51	−20	37	
18	Fossano	38	8	8	22	40	69	−29	32	
19	Borgosesia	38	8	6	24	47	77	−30	30	Readmitted (Note: Both Borgosesia and Vado were relegated to Eccellenza but were later readmitted to fill the vacancies created.)
20	Vado	38	6	8	24	36	76	−40	26	Readmitted

Source: Risultati e classifiche
(C) Champions; (D) Disqualified; (O) Play-off winners

== Girone B ==
=== League table ===
Pos	Team	Pld	W	D	L	GF	GA	GD	Pts	Promotion, qualification or relegation
1	Seregno (C, P)	34	21	6	7	54	36	+18	69	Promotion to Serie C
2	Fanfulla	34	19	7	8	60	36	+24	64	Qualification to promotion play-offs
3	NibionnOggiono (O)	34	15	10	9	48	38	+10	55 (Note: NibionnOggiono finished ahead of Casatese on head-to-head points: NibionnOggiono 1–1 Casatese, Casatese 0–1 NibionnOggiono.)	Club disbanded (Note: NibionOggiono were disbanded and gave their sports title to Sangiuliano City.)
4	Casatese	34	16	7	11	53	41	+12	55	Qualification to promotion play-offs
5	Crema	34	14	11	9	62	51	+11	53	Qualification to promotion play-offs
6	Desenzano Calvina	34	15	7	12	49	52	−3	52	
7	Brusaporto	34	15	4	15	52	53	−1	49 (Note: Brusaporto finished ahead of Breno on head-to-head points: Breno 1–2 Brusaporto, Brusaporto 2–2 Breno.)	
8	Breno	34	12	13	9	44	35	+9	49	
9	Sporting Franciacorta	34	12	12	10	47	37	+10	48	
10	Sona	34	13	7	14	49	52	−3	46	
11	Real Calepina	34	11	10	13	36	42	−6	43	
12	Virtus CiseranoBergamo	34	11	9	14	41	42	−1	42	
13	Pontisola	34	10	11	13	37	41	−4	41	
14	Vis Nova Giussano	34	11	6	17	43	62	−19	39	
15	Villa Valle	34	9	11	14	51	60	−9	38	
16	Caravaggio	34	10	8	16	48	61	−13	38	
17	Tritium	34	9	8	17	41	52	−11	35	Readmitted (Note: Tritium were relegated to Eccellenza but were later readmitted to fill the vacancies created.)
18	Scanzorosciate (R)	34	7	5	22	28	52	−24	26	Relegation to Eccellenza

Source: Risultati e classifiche
(C) Champions; (O) Play-off winners; (P) Promoted; (R) Relegated

== Girone C ==
=== League table ===
Pos	Team	Pld	W	D	L	GF	GA	GD	Pts	Promotion, qualification or relegation
1	Trento (C, P)	38	23	12	3	65	35	+30	81	Promotion to Serie C
2	Arzignano (O)	38	19	10	9	52	34	+18	67	Qualification to promotion play-offs
3	Manzanese	38	19	9	10	64	44	+20	66	Qualification to promotion play-offs
4	Union Clodiense Chioggia	38	17	11	10	51	41	+10	62	Qualification to promotion play-offs
5	Caldiero Terme	38	15	16	7	56	36	+20	61	Qualification to promotion play-offs
6	Mestre	38	18	6	14	58	49	+9	60	
7	Delta Rovigo	38	17	7	14	51	38	+13	58	
8	Luparense	38	15	9	14	52	48	+4	54	
9	Belluno	38	12	17	9	43	45	−2	53	Merged under a new denomination (Note: Belluno and Union San Giorgio didn't submit their application for the following season, thus being excluded from the league. Then they merged with Union Feltre under the new denomination of Dolomiti Bellunesi.)
10	Cjarlins Muzane	38	13	13	12	60	60	0	52	
11	Cartigliano	38	13	13	12	42	45	−3	52	
12	Union San Giorgio	38	13	10	15	48	48	0	49	Merged under a new denomination
13	Adriese	38	13	10	15	55	64	−9	49	
14	Ambrosiana	38	11	14	13	57	64	−7	47	
15	Este	38	9	16	13	45	53	−8	43	
16	Campodarsego	38	10	10	18	41	48	−7	40	
17	Union Feltre	38	10	9	19	41	59	−18	39	Merged under a new denomination
18	Virtus Bolzano (R)	38	10	8	20	46	52	−6	38	Qualification to relegation play-out (Note: Since Virtus Bolzano and Montebelluna finished tied on points, they played a relegation play-out game which was won 2–1 by Montebelluna, thus relegating Virtus Bolzano to Eccellenza.)
19	Montebelluna	38	10	8	20	41	67	−26	38	Qualification to relegation play-out
20	Chions (R)	38	3	12	23	30	68	−38	21	Relegation to Eccellenza

Source: Risultati e classifiche
(C) Champions; (O) Play-off winners; (P) Promoted; (R) Relegated

== Girone D ==
=== League table ===
Pos	Team	Pld	W	D	L	GF	GA	GD	Pts	Promotion, qualification or relegation
1	Fiorenzuola (P)	34	23	6	5	76	32	+44	75	Promotion to Serie C
2	Aglianese (O)	34	22	7	5	61	35	+26	73	Qualification to promotion play-offs
3	Lentigione	34	17	14	3	57	27	+30	65	Qualification to promotion play-offs
4	Prato	34	15	9	10	50	41	+9	54	Qualification to promotion play-offs
5	Rimini	34	14	10	10	56	44	+12	52	Qualification to promotion play-offs
6	Forlì	34	14	10	10	51	46	+5	52	
7	Pro Sorgenti Livorno	34	14	6	14	56	59	−3	48	
8	Correggese	34	13	8	13	53	58	−5	47	
9	Real Forte Querceta	34	12	10	12	45	47	−2	46	
10	Sammaurese	34	11	9	14	50	53	−3	42	
11	Ghivizzano Borgo a Mozzano	34	11	8	15	44	48	−4	41	
12	Bagnolese	34	9	13	12	40	41	−1	40	
13	Mezzolara	34	9	12	13	40	49	−9	39	
14	Progresso	34	9	9	16	41	56	−15	36 (Note: Progresso finished ahead of Seravezza Pozzi on head-to-head points: Seravezza Pozzi 1–2 Progresso, Progresso 1–0 Seravezza Pozzi.)	
15	Seravezza Pozzi	34	9	9	16	41	54	−13	36	
16	Sasso Marconi	34	8	9	17	36	57	−21	33	
17	Marignanese	34	6	11	17	42	57	−15	29	Readmitted (Note: Marignanese were relegated to Eccellenza but were later readmitted to fill the vacancies created.)
18	Corticella (R)	34	4	12	18	33	68	−35	24	Relegation to Eccellenza

Source: Risultati e classifiche
(O) Play-off winners; (P) Promoted; (R) Relegated

== Girone E ==
=== League table ===
Pos	Team	Pld	W	D	L	GF	GA	GD	Pts	Promotion, qualification or relegation
1	Aquila Montevarchi (C, P)	34	21	8	5	68	32	+36	71	Promotion to Serie C
2	Trastevere (O)	34	17	9	8	56	38	+18	60	Qualification to promotion play-offs
3	Sporting Trestina	34	15	11	8	48	33	+15	56	Qualification to promotion play-offs
4	San Donato Tavarnelle	34	14	12	8	48	40	+8	54	Qualification to promotion play-offs
5	Siena (Note: Siena were admitted to Serie C to fill the vacancies created.) (P)	34	15	8	11	48	40	+8	53	Qualification to promotion play-offs
6	Follonica Gavorrano	34	14	9	11	48	37	+11	51	
7	Pianese	34	13	12	9	41	34	+7	51	
8	Lornano Badesse	34	13	9	12	51	44	+7	48	
9	Tiferno	34	13	8	13	44	48	−4	47	
10	Cannara	34	12	11	11	41	48	−7	47	
11	Sangiovannese	34	12	9	13	42	43	−1	45	
12	Montespaccato	34	11	8	15	40	47	−7	41	
13	Ostiamare	34	8	15	11	50	54	−4	39	
14	Flaminia	34	9	12	13	44	57	−13	39	
15	Foligno	34	9	9	16	35	48	−13	36	
16	Scandicci (Note: 2 point deducted for fixing a match against Viareggio during the 2018–19 season.)	34	10	7	17	42	49	−7	35	
17	Grassina (R)	34	6	12	16	32	52	−20	30	Relegation to Eccellenza
18	Sinalunghese (R)	34	4	11	19	24	58	−34	23	Relegation to Eccellenza

Source: Risultati e classifiche
(C) Champions; (O) Play-off winners; (P) Promoted; (R) Relegated

== Girone F ==
=== League table ===
Pos	Team	Pld	W	D	L	GF	GA	GD	Pts	Promotion, qualification or relegation
1	Campobasso (C, P)	34	21	9	4	63	29	+34	72	Promotion to Serie C
2	San Nicolò Notaresco	34	18	10	6	59	34	+25	64	Qualification to promotion play-offs
3	Pineto (O)	34	15	11	8	45	33	+12	56 (Note: Head-to-head points: Pineto 6, Albalonga 5, Matese 4.)	Qualification to promotion play-offs
4	Albalonga	34	14	14	6	51	35	+16	56	Qualification to promotion play-offs
5	F.C. Matese	34	15	11	8	46	38	+8	56	Qualification to promotion play-offs
6	Castelfidardo	34	14	13	7	46	33	+13	55	
7	Recanatese	34	13	11	10	62	45	+17	50	
8	Castelnuovo	34	14	8	12	53	53	0	50	
9	Vastese (Note: 1 point deducted for not paying the salary to a player during the 2018–19 season.)	34	12	13	9	45	37	+8	48	
10	Montegiorgio	34	13	7	14	42	42	0	46	
11	Rieti	34	12	8	14	38	42	−4	44	
12	Racing Aprilia	34	11	11	12	43	49	−6	44	
13	Atletico Terme Fiuggi	34	8	16	10	40	41	−1	40 (Note: Head-to-head points: Atletico Terme Fiuggi 6, Tolentino 5, Vastogirardi 3.)	
14	Tolentino	34	9	13	12	52	53	−1	40	
15	Vastogirardi	34	10	10	14	46	51	−5	40	
16	Real Giulianova	34	7	10	17	33	50	−17	31	Club disbanded (Note: Real Giulianova were disbanded and gave their sports title to Nereto. Their football history continued under ASD Giulianova, club playing in Eccellenza.)
17	Porto Sant'Elpidio (R)	34	4	5	25	22	63	−41	17	Relegation to Eccellenza
18	Olympia Agnonese (R)	34	3	6	25	25	83	−58	15	Relegation to Eccellenza

Source: Risultati e classifiche
(C) Champions; (O) Play-off winners; (P) Promoted; (R) Relegated

== Girone G ==
=== League table ===
Pos	Team	Pld	W	D	L	GF	GA	GD	Pts	Promotion, qualification or relegation
1	Monterosi (C, P)	34	24	9	1	65	26	+39	81	Promotion to Serie C
2	Latina (Note: Latina were admitted to Serie C to fill the vacancies created.) (O, P)	34	19	8	7	60	29	+31	65	Qualification to promotion play-offs
3	Savoia	34	14	15	5	39	22	+17	57	Club disbanded (Note: Savoia were disbanded and gave their sports title to Giugliano.)
4	Vis Artena	34	16	5	13	50	43	+7	53 (Note: Vis Artena finished ahead of Nocerina on head-to-head points: Nocerina 1–2 Vis Artena, Vis Artena 0–0 Nocerina.)	Qualification to promotion play-offs
5	Nocerina	34	13	14	7	51	32	+19	53	Qualification to promotion play-offs
6	Insieme Formia	34	13	11	10	52	39	+13	50	
7	Lanusei	34	12	11	11	46	40	+6	47	
8	Muravera	34	13	8	13	42	40	+2	47	
9	Carbonia	34	12	10	12	56	55	+1	46	
10	Sassari Latte Dolce	34	11	11	12	45	42	+3	44	
11	Cassino	34	9	14	11	41	48	−7	41	
12	Gladiator	34	9	13	12	37	44	−7	40	
13	Nuova Florida	34	8	15	11	39	47	−8	39	
14	Arzachena	34	7	15	12	39	50	−11	36	
15	Torres	34	8	10	16	31	48	−17	34	
16	Afragolese	34	9	7	18	40	60	−20	34	
17	Nola (Note: 1 point deducted for delaying the salary payment to a player during the 2018–19 season.)	34	7	13	14	37	58	−21	33	Readmitted (Note: Both Nola and Giugliano were relegated to Eccellenza but were later readmitted. The former due to vacancies created, the latter was given the sports title of Savoia.)
18	Giugliano	34	5	5	24	29	76	−47	20	Readmitted

Source: Risultati e classifiche
(C) Champions; (O) Play-off winners; (P) Promoted

== Girone H ==
=== League table ===
Pos	Team	Pld	W	D	L	GF	GA	GD	Pts	Promotion, qualification or relegation
1	Taranto (C, P)	34	19	12	3	50	23	+27	69	Promotion to Serie C
2	Picerno (Note: Picerno were admitted to Serie C since Gozzano renounced promotion.) (O, P)	34	19	11	4	58	34	+24	68	Qualification to promotion play-offs
3	Fidelis Andria (Note: Fidelis Andria were admitted to Serie C to fill the vacancies created.) (P)	34	16	13	5	40	18	+22	61	Qualification to promotion play-offs
4	Bitonto	34	16	7	11	51	42	+9	55 (Note: Bitonto finished ahead of Casarano on head-to-head goal difference: Bitonto 1–3 Casarano, Casarano 0–3 Bitonto.)	Qualification to promotion play-offs
5	Casarano	34	15	10	9	49	39	+10	55	Qualification to promotion play-offs
6	Lavello	34	14	12	8	55	40	+15	54	
7	Audace Cerignola	34	14	10	10	62	39	+23	52	
8	Nardò	34	13	10	11	45	39	+6	49	
9	Team Altamura	34	12	11	11	49	42	+7	47	
10	Molfetta	34	11	9	14	54	60	−6	42	
11	Sorrento	34	10	11	13	41	54	−13	41	
12	Gravina	34	8	11	15	33	40	−7	35	
13	Fasano	34	8	11	15	38	50	−12	35	
14	Francavilla	34	7	13	14	34	48	−14	34	
15	Real Agro Aversa	34	9	7	18	40	57	−17	34	
16	Portici	34	10	4	20	50	73	−23	34	
17	Brindisi (Note: 2 point deducted for not paying the salary to four players during the 2019–20 season.)	34	8	11	15	27	45	−18	33	Readmitted (Note: Brindisi were relegated to Eccellenza but were later readmitted to fill the vacancies created.)
18	Puteolana (R)	34	5	11	18	23	56	−33	26	Relegation to Eccellenza

Source: Risultati e classifiche
(C) Champions; (O) Play-off winners; (P) Promoted; (R) Relegated

== Girone I ==
=== League table ===
Pos	Team	Pld	W	D	L	GF	GA	GD	Pts	Promotion, qualification or relegation
1	ACR Messina (C, P)	34	21	11	2	66	25	+41	74	Promotion to Serie C
2	FC Messina (O)	34	21	9	4	59	25	+34	72	Qualification to promotion play-offs
3	Gelbison	34	19	9	6	54	32	+22	66	Qualification to promotion play-offs
4	San Luca	34	17	7	10	46	38	+8	58	Qualification to promotion play-offs
5	Acireale	34	17	6	11	51	32	+19	57	Qualification to promotion play-offs
6	Dattilo	34	16	4	14	51	47	+4	52	Club disbanded (Note: Dattilo were disbanded and gave their sports title to Trapani.)
7	Rotonda	34	13	10	11	31	33	−2	49	
8	Santa Maria Cilento	34	10	15	9	43	29	+14	45	
9	Biancavilla (Note: 1 point deducted for not paying the salary to a club member during the previous season.)	34	14	4	16	43	47	−4	45	
10	Licata	34	11	10	13	36	39	−3	43	
11	Castrovillari	34	10	11	13	39	37	+2	41	
12	Paternò	34	10	9	15	28	35	−7	39	
13	Cittanovese	34	10	9	15	42	51	−9	39	
14	Sant'Agata	34	8	12	14	32	48	−16	36	
15	Troina	34	9	9	16	27	47	−20	36	
16	Rende	34	9	7	18	38	58	−20	34	
17	Marina di Ragusa (R)	34	8	9	17	38	58	−20	33	Club disbanded (Note: Marina di Ragusa were subsequently disbanded and gave their Eccellenza sports title to Città di Siracusa.)
18	Roccella (R)	34	5	5	24	25	68	−43	20	Relegation to Eccellenza

Source: Risultati e classifiche
(C) Champions; (O) Play-off winners; (P) Promoted; (R) Relegated
