= Stefano De Angelis =

Italian footballer

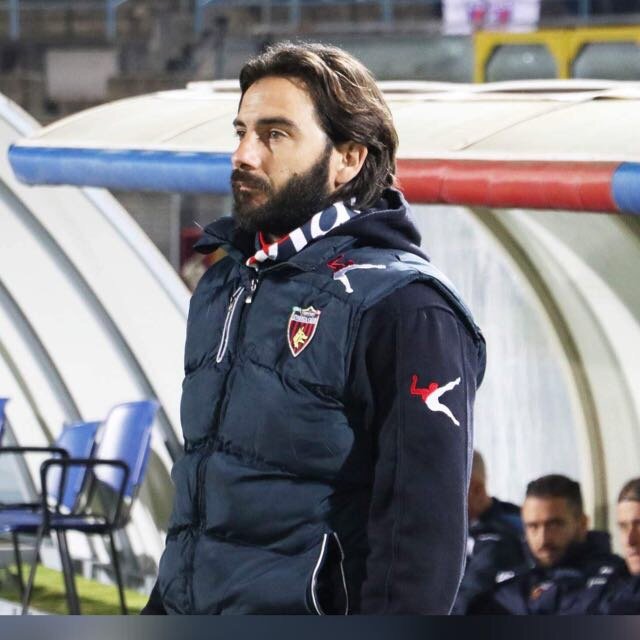
- De Angelis coaching Cosenza.

Personal information
- Date of birth: 23 May 1974 (age 52)
- Place of birth: Rome, Italy
- Height: 1.78 m (5 ft 10 in)
- Position: Defender

Senior career*
Years	Team	Apps	(Gls)
1991–1992	Siracusa	11	(0)
1992–1993	Atletico Acilia	29	(2)
1993–1997	Ischia	64	(1)
1997–1999	Gualdo	61	(2)
1999–2003	Cosenza	64	(0)
2001–2002	→ Cagliari	34	(1)
2003–2005	Salernitana	40	(0)
2005-2006	Genoa	13	(0)
2006	Catanzaro	12	(0)
2006–2008	Avellino	49	(10)
2008–2009	Aversa Normanna	11	(0)
2009–2011	Avellino	18	(1)
2011	Città di Marino	20	(4)

Managerial career
- 2011-2012: Città di Marino
- 2012-2013: Rende
- 2014: Cosenza (youth)
- 2014–2016: Cosenza (assistant)
- 2016–2017: Cosenza
- 2017–2018: Bari (youth)
- 2018–2019: Cosenza (youth)
- 2019: Avezzano
- 2020: San Luca
- 2020–2021: Ostiamare
- 2021–2022: Lavello (assistant)
- 2022–2024: Ħamrun Spartans (assistant)
- 2024–2025: Birkirkara
- * Club domestic league appearances and goals

Stefano De Angelis (born 23 May 1974) is an Italian football manager and a former player, who played as a defender.

== Coaching career ==
9 Years after playing his last match, he joined Serie D club Ostiamare on 30 October 2020.

On 13 November 2021 he was announced as technical collaborator of head coach Karel Zeman at Lavello.

He successively left Lavello to join Ħamrun Spartans as an assistant coach.

On 7 June 2024, he joined Birkirkara as a manager.
