= Luca Ricciardi =

Italian footballer

Personal information
- Date of birth: 7 August 1989 (age 37)
- Place of birth: Gaeta, Italy
- Height: 1.73 m (5 ft 8 in)
- Position: Midfielder

Team information
- Current team: Matese

Senior career*
Years	Team	Apps	(Gls)
2005–2007	Gaeta	40	(2)
2007–2015	Latina	131	(13)
2015	→ Pisa (loan)	6	(1)
2015–2016	Tuttocuoio	29	(0)
2016–2017	Racing Roma	38	(1)
2017–2018	Fondi	29	(0)
2018–2019	Olympia Agnonese	32	(7)
2019–2020	Fermana	21	(0)
2020–2021	Rimini	30	(2)
2021	Insieme Formia	12	(0)
2021–	Matese	20	(1)
- * Club domestic league appearances and goals as of 22 May 2022

Luca Ricciardi (born 7 August 1989) is an Italian footballer who plays as a midfielder for Matese.

== Club career ==
He made his Serie C debut for Latina on 4 September 2011 in a game against Siracusa.

On 25 September 2018, he joined Olympia Agnonese.

On 15 July 2019, he signed a 2-year contract with Fermana. On 20 August 2020 he moved to Rimini.

In December 2021, he moved to Matese.
