= Daniele Napoletano =

Italian footballer (born 1993)

Personal information
- Full name: Daniele Napoletano
- Date of birth: 20 April 1993 (age 33)
- Place of birth: Piedimonte Matese, Italy
- Height: 1.72 m (5 ft 8 in)
- Position: Forward

Team information
- Current team: F.C. Matese

Senior career*
Years	Team	Apps	(Gls)
2013–2014	S.S.D. Sesto Campano	??	(16)
2014–2016	Tre Pini Matese	51	(76)
2016	Sangiovannese	2	(0)
2016–2017	Tre Pini Matese	??	(43)
2017	A.S.D. Polisportiva Vastogirardi	3	(3)
2017–2018	Tre Pini Matese	2	(3)
2018	A.S.D. G.S. Felino	??	(??)
2018–2019	A.S.D. Comprensorio Vairano	??	(??)
2019	Borgo San Donnino	??	(??)
2019–2020	S.S.D. Puteolana 1902	??	(??)
2020–2021	U.S. Venafro	??	(??)
2021–2024	F.C. Matese	??	(??)
2024	U.S. Venafro	??	(??)
2024–	F.C. Matese	??	(??)
- * Club domestic league appearances and goals

Daniele Napoletano (born 20 April 1993) is an Italian footballer who plays as a forward for Eccellenza Molise club F.C. Matese.

== Career ==
Born in Piedimonte Matese, in the Province of Caserta, Campania, Italy, Napoletano spent the 2013–14 season with Sesto Campano, before signing for hometown club Tre Pini Matese during the following campaign. He stayed with Tre Pini for two seasons, after which he transferred to Serie D side Sangiovannese in the 2016–17 season. In his first spell at Tre Pini Matese, Napoletano recorded 93 goals over the course of three seasons. Having amassed 43 goals in 30 appearances for Tre Pini in the 2015–16 season, Napoletano's goalscoring feats were compared to that of Leicester City's Jamie Vardy and then-Napoli forward, Gonzalo Higuaín. After making just two appearances in Serie D, he left Sangiovannese and re-joined Tre Pini in September 2016. Napoletano departed Tre Pini Matese for the second time in September 2017, transferring to Vastogirardi. Having scored 3 goals in three matches for Vastogirardi, he re-signed for a third time with Tre Pini. Napoletano scored in his first game back at the Ferrante stadium. He scored a brace for Tre Pini, against Spinete, in a 1–5 away win for the Campanian side.
