= Barbella =

Barbella is an Italian surname. Notable people with the surname include:

- Costantino Barbella (1853–1925), Italian sculptor
- Emanuele Barbella (1718–1777), Italian classical composer
- Maria Barbella (1868–1902), the second woman sentenced to die in the electric chair

== See also ==
- Barbella (1954 film), a Bengali-language film directed by Kalpataru
