= Gioacchino Toma =

Italian painter

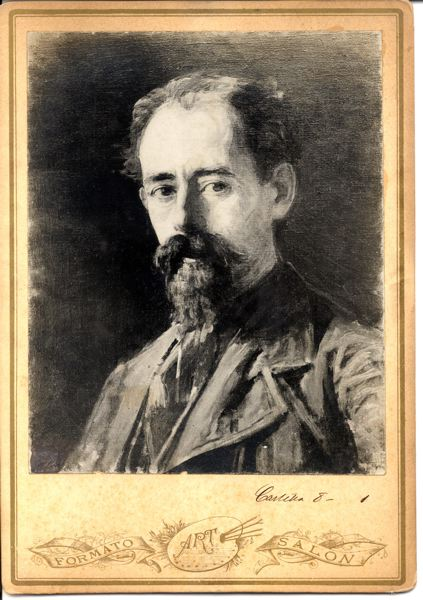
Gioacchino Toma (c.1880)

Gioacchino Toma (24 January 1836 – 12 January 1891) was an Italian art instructor and painter, noted primarily for historic, realistic and genre subjects in a Romantic style.

Toward the end of his life, Toma authored his autobiography, Memories of an Orphan (Ricordi di un Orfano, Giannini & Figli, 1886) relating a series of memories to his son, Gustavo: his difficult childhood; his tenacity; his desire for redemption; and his civil and political commitment. Together, Toma's experiences imbued his work with an overt melancholy – such that critics commonly described him as "il pittore del grigio", the painter of gray.

== Biography ==
Toma was born to a well-known doctor from Galatina – subsequently to be orphaned by his father at age six and by his mother at age eight. At age ten, he was entrusted to a paternal uncle and rejected – sent first to a convent and then to the free Hospice of Giovinazzo, a poorhouse. There, Toma learned to draw, making a number still life sketches. He was otherwise self-taught. After leaving the hospice, Toma severed ties with his family at age 18, and fled in 1855 to Naples. There, Toma apprenticed with painter Alessandro Fergola and Domenico Morelli, producing sketches and becoming proficient in ornamental paintwork.

From 1854 to 1855, he worked as an ornamental painter in Naples. In 1857, he was suspected of being an Anti-Bourbon conspirator and was exiled to Piedimonte d'Alife. While there, he first took up painting seriously, producing a portrait of the Duke of Laurenzana and noted still life works.

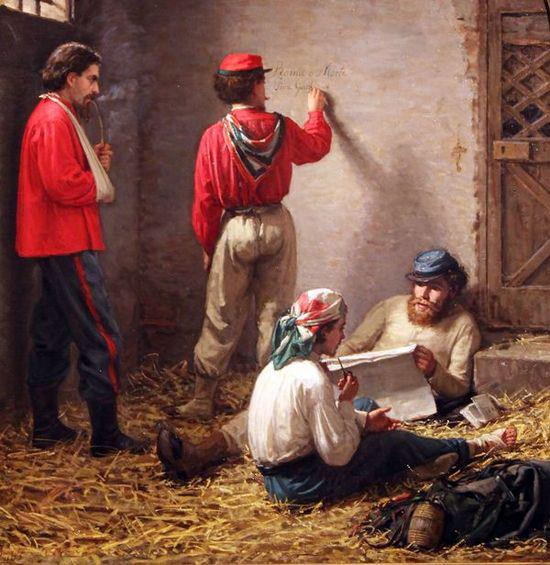
Rome or Death! (1863)

After 1859, he took part in revolutionary activities, fighting with Garibaldi and becoming a member of the Matese Legion in 1860. He held several exhibitions in Naples (1861–62) and Florence (1863), subsequently leaving public life to teach drawing in municipal schools. He began exhibiting again in 1874.

Toma became widely known as an art instructor, as professor at the Royal Academy of Fine Arts at Naples and honorary professor of the Accademia Ligustica and Director of the School of Applied Design. He was named a knight of the Order of the Crown of Italy.

Toma published collections of designs for the manufacture of lace, which were awarded silver medal at the Esposizione Generale Italiana of Turin in 1884. He published a text of elementary design, which included a collection of plant drawings and other drawings in twenty plates. Very near the end of his life, Toma authored his short autobiography, Memories of an orphan (Ricordi di un orfano).

Toma's pupils included the noted Neapolitan sculptor Giovanni de Martino and painter Lionello Balestrieri. Numerous streets across Italy are named Via Gioacchino Toma after the artist, including two in Naples – in Vomero and Guigliano in Campagnia.

Toma died on 12 January 1891, in Naples.

== Works ==
Toma painted a large canvas on the Eruption of Vesuvius, also called A Rain of Ashes (La pioggia di cenere di Vesuvio), which was displayed at the Turin Exhibition and donated to the Academy of Florence. It documents a tradition that locals from the areas at the foot of the volcano, during minor eruptions, would parade an icon of Saint Januarius and plead in prayer to be spared greater harm from an eruption. He also painted La confessione. Angelo de Gubernatis quotes a critic, remarking on the latter painting, who called Toma a painter of "...scenes of sacristy, convents, monks, schools, of scenes where the penumbra of the church choir enlivened by flashes of red light from candles and lamps; he is a master at gathering the ecclesiastical countenance in people and things, and of us getting us to gather the sense of the sacred place which spreads with the smell of incense and light governed by the large hanging lamps." While both works depict folk religious fervor, they highlight some of the more primitive and superstitious elements.

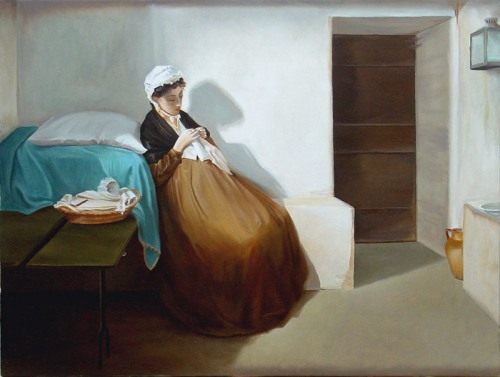
Luisa Sanfelice in Prison (1874)

Among other major works are Man Tortured by Inquisition, exhibited at Paris; Clemente VII che nasconde le gioie del Vaticano, exhibited at the Promotrice of Naples; La guardia alla rota dei trovatelli, bought by the Ministry of Public Education; Le orfane, awarded in Naples; La messa in casa, acquired by the City of Naples; l'onomastico della maestra, donated to the Academy of Naples.

His master work Luisa Sanfelice in carcere (Luisa Sanfelice in prison) is in the collection of the Capodimonte Museum in Naples, reproduced in the Illustrazione Italiana. This work depicts the former aristocrat in her jail cell in Castel Sant’Elmo, stitching a dress for the child she was expecting. Her decapitation was carried out by order of the restored Bourbon king for supporting the Parthenopean Republic of 1799.
