= Marcelo Tapia =

Uruguayan footballer (born 1992)

Personal information
- Full name: Marcelo Daniel Tapia Amarillo
- Date of birth: 26 September 1992 (age 34)
- Place of birth: Montevideo, Uruguay
- Height: 1.86 m (6 ft 1 in)
- Position: Attacking midfielder

Senior career*
Years	Team	Apps	(Gls)
2011–2014	Progreso	14	(1)
2014–2016	Club Oriental	14	(1)
2016–2019	Villa Teresa	49	(13)
2019–2021	Boston River	36	(0)
2021–2022	Villa Teresa	6	(0)
2022	Lavello	16	(7)
- * Club domestic league appearances and goals

Marcelo Daniel Tapia Amarillo (born September 26, 1992, in Montevideo, Uruguay) is a Uruguayan footballer.

== Career ==
After a career spent in the lower leagues of his native Uruguay, on 1 February 2022 Tapia moved to Italy to sign for Serie D club Lavello.
