= Minicucci =

Minicucci is a surname. Notable people with the surname include:

- Ben Minicucci (born 1967), Canadian-born American airline executive
- Christina Minicucci, American politician
- Dominick Minicucci (born 1969), American gymnast
- Manél Minicucci (born 1995), Italian footballer
- Matthew Minicucci (born 1981), American writer and poet
