= ASD Alliphae =

Italian football club

Alife
- Full name: Associazione Sportiva Dilettantistica Alife
- Founded: July 2007
- Ground: Stadio Marco Spinelli Via Napoli-Roma, Alife
- League: Prima Categoria Molise (Girone A)
- 2023–24: Prima Categoria Molise, 1st
Home colours

A.S.D. Alife is an Italian association football club based in Alife, Caserta, Campania, Southern Italy, that plays in the Eccellenza Molise.

== History ==
The club was founded in 2007 as A.S.D. Atletico Matese Alife ([aˈtlɛːtiko maˈteːze, -eːse]) They have been sponsored by Banca Capasso Antonio - S.P.A., Alife's local bank. They merged with Castello del Matese in the summer of 2023. The team plays in the Molise division of the Eccellenza, following promotion from Promozione in the 2024–25 season.

== Colours and badge ==
Alliphae's home colours are yellow and blue. The badge, which is derived from the town of Alife's 'Coat of Arms', depicts an elephant carrying a crenellated tower on its back whilst playing football.

== Stadio Marco Spinelli ==
Stadio Marco Spinelli is a municipal stadium in Alife. It is the home venue of Eccellenza Molise club ASD Alliphae/ASD Alife.

== Nearby clubs ==
Their closest rivals in terms of distance were Piedimonte Matese-based clubs Tre Pini Matese (defunct) and F.W.P. Matese (defunct). Alliphae also shares a rivalry with Caserta based outfit Casertana, which plays in Serie C (formerly Lega Pro). The distance between Alife and Piedimonte Matese is about 3.3 miles (5.5 km), whilst Caserta is approximately 24 miles (40 km) away.

== Squad ==
As of 5 August 2017

Note: Flags indicate national team as defined under FIFA eligibility rules; some limited exceptions apply. Players may hold more than one non-FIFA nationality.

| No. | Pos. | Nation | Player |
|---|---|---|---|
| — | GK | ITA | Vincenzo Ferrara |
| — | GK | ITA | Alfonso Mocci |
| — | GK | ITA | Antonio Paglia |
| — | DF | ITA | Salvatore Di Buccio |
| — | DF | ITA | Antonio Cecere |
| — | DF | ITA | Gabriele Farina |
| — | DF | ITA | Davide Fasulo |
| — | DF | ITA | Simone Iannotta |
| — | DF | ITA | Raffaele Di Nardo |
| — | DF | ITA | Francesco Romano |
| — | DF | ITA | Davide Santagata |
| — | DF | ITA | Domenico Vigliotti |
| — | MF | ITA | Simone Carpentino |
| — | MF | ITA | Sisto Cirioli |

| No. | Pos. | Nation | Player |
|---|---|---|---|
| — | MF | ITA | Francesco D'Elena |
| — | MF | ITA | Luca Ferrante |
| — | MF | ITA | Emiliano Gilardi |
| — | MF | ITA | Luca Iannelli |
| — | MF | ITA | Giuseppe Di Leone |
| — | MF | ITA | Marco Montone |
| — | MF | ITA | Agostino Natale |
| — | MF | ITA | Andrea Perrotta |
| — | MF | ITA | Augusto Salvatore |
| — | MF | ITA | Mario Santillo |
| — | FW | ITA | Piergiuseppe Ciaburro |
| — | FW | ITA | Francesco Grillo |
| — | FW | ITA | Giandomenico Iameo |
| — | FW | ITA | Vincenzo Manera |

== Non-playing staff ==
Staff

| Position | Name |
|---|---|
| Director | (Italy) Massimo Lombari |
| President | (Italy) Angelo Giammatteo |
| Vice president | (Italy) Luca Sasso |
| Manager | (Italy) Mario Morra |
| Assistant coach | (Italy) Vincenzo Panella |
