= Stadio Pasqualino Ferrante =

Italian football stadium

Stadio Comunale P. Ferrante
- Stadio di Sepicciano
- Interactive map of Stadio Comunale P. Ferrante
- Former names: Stadio Comunale
- Location: Sepicciano, Piedimonte Matese, Italy
- Coordinates: 41.349129°N 14.381653°E
- Owner: Municipality of Piedimonte Matese
- Capacity: 4,000 (seated)
- Surface: Artificial turf

Tenants
- Pro Piedimonte (1928–1958); G.S. Piedimonte 1988–???? A.G.C. Piedimonte; Tre Pini Matese (2012–2020); F.W.P. Matese (2013–2020); Tre Pini Matese Femminile; F.C. Matese (2020–present)

Stadio Comunale Pasqualino Ferrante di Piedimonte Matese, shortened to Stadio Pasqualino Ferrante and known locally as simply Stadio di Sepicciano, is a municipal stadium in Sepicciano, a frazione of Piedimonte Matese, Italy. It has served as the home venue of Tre Pini Matese, F.W.P. Matese and Femminile Reg. Calcio 5 club Tre Pini Matese Femminile. The stadium is now the home ground of F.C. Matese.

== History ==
The stadium, known today as "Stadio Pasqualino Ferrante", was built sometime during the early 20th century and played host to original tenants Pro Piedimonte (founded in 1928). Murals of past players and staff adorn the exterior walls of the stadium. In addition to championing the club's accomplishments, there is a separate mural dedicated to the country itself, celebrating the nation's footballing achievements at FIFA's 1934 (Italy), 1938 (France), 1982 (Spain), and 2006 (Germany) World Cups.

=== 2012, the Stadio Comunale Pasqualino Ferrante ===
In 2012, Stadio Comunale was renamed 'Stadio Comunale Pasqualino Ferrante di Piedimonte Matese'; to honour the town's municipal councillor, Pasqualino Ferrante.

The stadium's occupants from 2012 to 2020 were Tre Pini Matese; and F.W.P. Matese from 2013 to 2020. In addition to the men's team, the stadium hosted women's matches for Tre Pini Matese Femminile side.
