= Ave Gratia Plena, Piedimonte Matese =

Coordinates: 41°06′26″N 14°12′46″E

The church of Ave Gratia Plena is a baroque-style Roman Catholic church dedicated to the Virgin of the Annunciation located along via Angelo Scorciarini Coppola in Piedimonte Matese, in the Province of Caserta, in the region of Campania, Italy. The words "Ave gratia plena" translate into "Hail full of grace", the words uttered first by the Archangel Gabriel in the Annunciation. The church is also known as della Annunziata.

== History and description ==
The present site has housed a church since the 9th century. This building was reconstructed starting in the mid-1500s, but only reached reconsecration on 8 December 1640, under the Bishop of Alife, Pietro Paolo De Medici. The facade and bell-tower were built in 1694. Most of the interior decoration dates from the 18th century to present.

The facade has a marble portal with columns. The interior has three naves, decorated with baroque stucco by Domenico Antonio Vaccaro. Along the walls are six lateral altars. On the arch leading to the presbytery is a fresco of the Annunciation. The ceiling frescoes were completed in 1931–1945 by Gaetano Bocchetti. The choir stalls were carved in 1748 by Aniello Giordano. Above the choir is the large and crowded canvas depicting the Marriage of Canna (1732) by Nicola Maria Rossi. Further restorations began in 1990–1993 and again in 2015–2016, to repair the damage caused by the earthquake of 29 December 2013.

== See also ==
- 17th-century Western domes
