= Lionello Balestrieri =

Italian painter

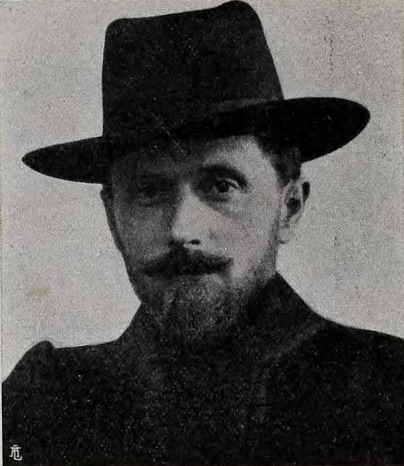
- Born: 12 September 1872, 1874; Cetona
- Died: 24 October 1958; Cetona
- Occupations: Painter, printmaker

Lionello Balestrieri (12 September 1872–24 October 1958) was an Italian painter and engraver, active in various styles mainly in Paris and Naples.

== Biography ==
He was born in Cetona in the province of Siena, Tuscany, to a mason of modest means. But his skills gained him admission first to the Institute of Fine Arts of Rome, then of Naples. In Naples, Balestrieri was forced to support himself as a decorative painter for rooms in private residences, but continued studying under Gioacchino Toma. Then briefly re-enrolled in the Institute of Fine Arts of Naples, then under the leadership Filippo Palizzi and Domenico Morelli. However, lured by the bohemian artistic circles of Paris, at the age of 20 years he moved there, working as an assistant to the Florentine engraver Osvaldo Tofani. Balestrieri contributed engravings for an edition of Dante's Divina Commedia published by Vittorio Alinari in 1900. He became friend and apartment-mate, with a violinist, Giuseppe Vannicola, whom he depicting in a canvas Waiting for the glory, exhibited at the 1897 Paris Salon.

Beethoven, 1900

Music continued to inspire his art for decades. In 1898, he painted the Death of Mimì (illustrated below) (Museum of the City, New York), for which Balestrieri painted himself as Rodolfo. In 1899, he painted a canvas depicting Beethoven (Kreutzer Sonata), This painting, which was awarded a prize at the 1900 Universal Exposition in Paris and in 1901 in Venice, brought him fame. The painting depicts a dimly lit garret-like apartment with a strand of listeners along the left wall, each in their own mood, while a violinist plays between them and a furnace. The face of the musician is hidden, and the wall has the empty gaze of a plaster mask of Beethoven. Numerous reproductions were made and sold of the painting.

By the 20th century he had come to know prominent composers such as Puccini, Giordano and Cilea. In 1902, when his mentor Morelli was dying, he travelled to Naples; from this encounter came another prominent work: The last days of Domenico Morelli, first exhibited in Monaco (1902), then in Venice (1903), and now on display at the Galleria Civica of Udine.

Balestrieri continued to paint Romantic subjects, tinged with emotion, specially referring to music. His style often changed with exposure to other currents such as Impressionism, the Macchiaioli style, but also styles compelled by a social realism. However, in 1914, he left Paris and settled in Naples, where he was recruited to direct the Institute of Fine Arts. In Naples, he often favored landscapes, but also painted many genre scenes and portraits.

He was briefly linked to a group of artists calling themselves the Gruppo degli Ostinati (Group of Obstinates); including Alberto Chiancone, Franco Girosi (1896-1987), Giovanni Brancaccio, Eugenio Viti, Manfredi Franco and Francesco Galante; meeting at the Caffè Tripoli at Piazza del Plebiscito; and urging the introduction of Modernist styles into the Neapolitan art circles. By the 1920s under the influence of Futurism, he painted works such as "Musical Sensations (1923), and also painted works celebrating Fascist power and Mussolini, such as Victorious March. In the 1950s, he experimented with modernist, cubist canvases. Late in life, he decided to return to Cetona, still painting landscapes when he died.

In his hometown of Cetona, a foundation named after the painter was established with the aim of fostering cultural events. It has organized, with the help of the comune, a number of retrospectives of the painter and his circle, including one in 2015 at the Palazzo Minutelli Ciolo (city hall).

== Partial anthology of works ==
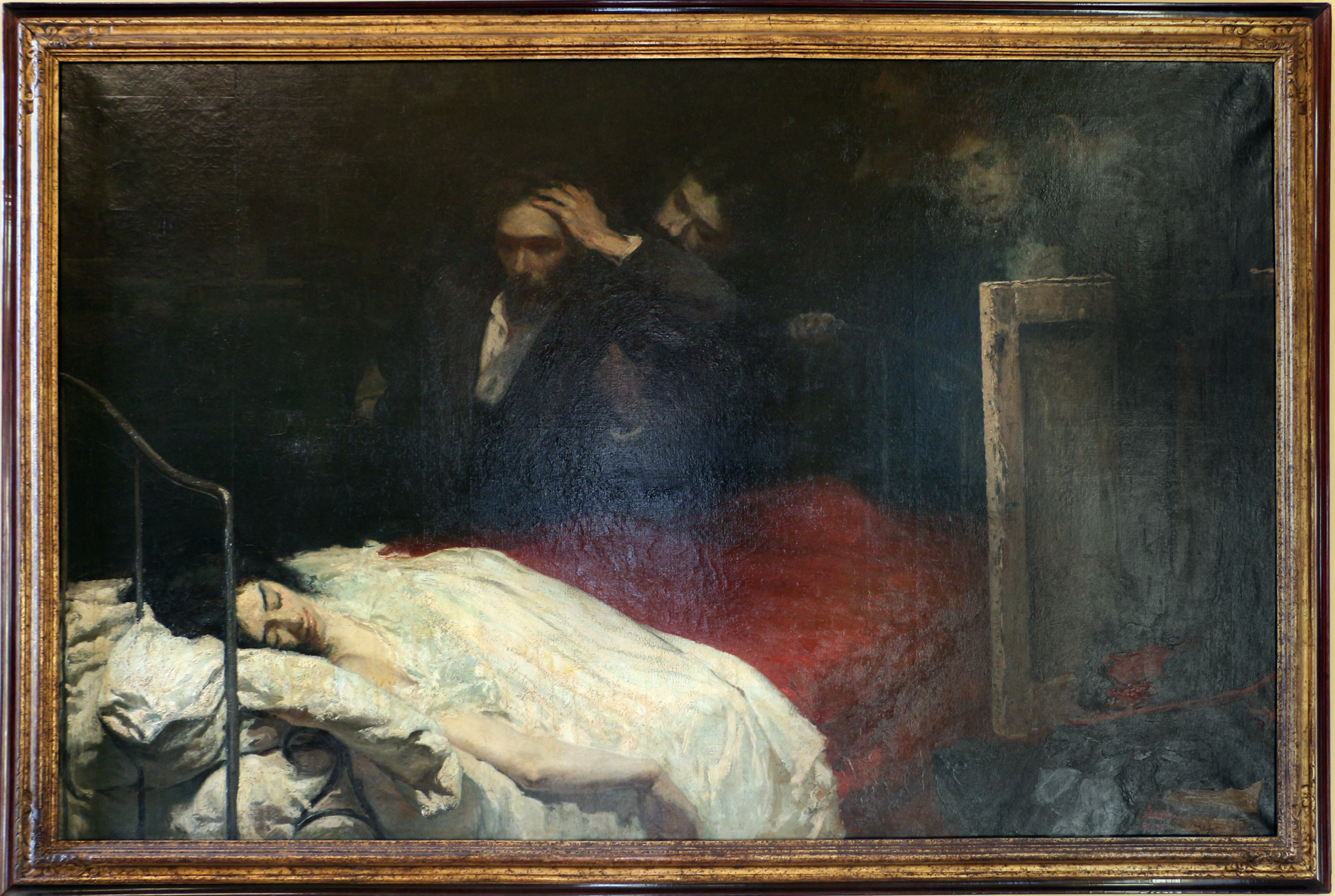
La morte di Mimì, 1898

- Lettrice, Luxembourg Museum, Paris
- Wife of the Poet, Galleria d'Arte Moderna, Palermo
- Mattutino, Galleria d'Arte Moderna, Palermo
- Lamartine, Gallerie Nazionale d'Arte Moderna, Rome
- Washerwomen on the Seine
- Signora che ricama in giardino
- Il pazzo e i savi (1912)
- Christ among the Peasants
- Mademoiselle Chiffon (1914)
- Cavalli in salita
- Graziella
- Tryptych La Glu (from the Romance of J. Richepin)
- Cyrano
- Glauco
- Penetration
- Orchestra
