= Alfonso Camorani =

Italian footballer (born 1978)

Personal information
- Date of birth: 21 February 1978 (age 48)
- Place of birth: Cercola, Italy
- Height: 1.79 m (5 ft 10 1/2 in)
- Position: Defensive midfielder

Youth career
- 1994–1997: Avellino

Senior career*
Years	Team	Apps	(Gls)
1997–1998	Campobasso	31	(4)
1998–1999	Ternana	2	(0)
1999–2000	Alzano Virescit	0	(0)
2000–2001	Teramo	43	(3)
2001–2004	Salernitana	66	(2)
2003	→ Lecce (loan)	17	(3)
2004–2005	Fiorentina	15	(2)
2004–2005	→ Siena (loan)	11	(0)
2005–2007	Lecce	37	(0)
2007–2008	Treviso	14	(0)
2007–2008	→ Spezia (loan)	35	(1)
2008–2011	Pescara	32	(0)
2009–2010	→ Cassino (loan)	17	(0)
2010	→ Nocerina (loan)	13	(0)
2011	→ Sorrento (loan)	3	(0)
2011	Casertana	9	(0)
2012–2013	Virtus Carano	24	(?)
2013–2014	Gelbison Cliento	26	(0)
2014–2015	Sessana	19	(3)
2015–2016	Afragolese	20	(?)
2016	Mondragone City	0	(0)
2016–2017	Nuova Ischia	24	(3)
2017–2018	A.S.C.D. Saviano	26	(8)
2018	Vitulazio Calcio	0	(0)
2018–2019	Tre Pini Matese	25	(?)
2020	Virtus Curti Camorani	?	(?)

Managerial career
- 2019–2020: Tre Pini Matese
- 2021–2022: Forza e Coraggio
- 2022–2023: Venafro
- 2023–2024: Virtus Gioiese
- * Club domestic league appearances and goals as of 18:55, 25 July 2026 (UTC)

Alfonso Camorani (born 21 February 1978) is an Italian football manager and former footballer who played as a midfielder.

== Playing career ==
=== Avellino ===
Camorani began his youth career with Avellino. In the 1995–96 season, aged 16, he helped the Campania side won their second Campionato Nazionale Dante Berretti title.

=== Campobasso ===
In 1997, Camorani joined Serie D club Campobasso, where he made 31 appearances and scored 4 goals in his only season with the side. With Campobasso, he won the Coppa Italia Dilettanti.

=== Ternana ===
Camorani transferred to Serie B club Ternana in 1998, where he made just 2 goalless appearances, before leaving in 1999.

=== Alzano Virescit ===
He joined newly promoted Serie B club Alzano Virescit in 1999, but left in 2000.

=== Teramo ===
Camorani signed for Serie C2's Teramo in 1999, where he made 43 appearances over the course of two seasons. He departed the club in 2001.

=== Salernitana ===
Camorani made his return to Serie B with Salernitana in 2001.

==== Loan to Lecce ====
Camorani spent the second half of the 2002–03 season on loan to Lecce.

=== Fiorentina ===
He joined fellow Serie B club Fiorentina in the second half of the 2003–04 season. With the club, he achieved promotion to Serie A. Fiorentina loaned him to fellow Serie A club Siena. Camorani made his league debut on 12 September 2004, against Palermo.

=== Lecce ===
Camorani returned to former club Lecce for a second stint, where he had previously been on loan during the 2002–03 season.

=== Treviso ===
Camorani moved to Treviso in January 2007, in a co-ownership deal for a peppercorn of €500, along with Martin Petráš (loan), in part exchange for Marcello Cottafava, Blažej Vašcák and Alberto Giuliatto's transfers. The following summer, he was signed by Spezia.

==== Loan to Pescara ====
He joined Pescara on loan in 2008.

==== Loan to Cassino ====
In August 2009, Camorani was loaned to Cassino.

== Honours ==
=== Player ===
==== Youth competitions ====
- Campionato Nazionale Dante Berretti

Avellino: 1995−1996

==== Interregional competitions ====
- Coppa Italia Dilettanti (Fase C.N.D.): 1

Campobasso: 1997−1998
