= Matese Legion =

- Disbanded: 1861
- Country: Italy
- Allegiance: Giuseppe Garibaldi Kingdom of Italy
- Branch: Redshirts (Italy)
- Type: militia
- Role: support the efforts of Garibaldi towards Italian unification
- Size: 240+ volunteers
- Engagements: Expedition of the Thousand: Battle of Caiazzo; Battle of Piedimonte; Batte of Volturnus; Battle of Isernia

Commanders
- Notable commanders: Beniamino Caso Salvatore Pizzi Giuliano Iannotta Giuseppe de Blasiis Major Guadagno Guadagni

The Matese Legion (Italian: Legione del Matese [maˈteːze]) was a group of 240 Italian volunteers that joined Giuseppe Garibaldi in the war for Italian unification in 1861. It was formed in Piedimonte D'Alife, now called Piedimonte Matese, in June 1860, and was officially established on 25 August of the same year. Membership in the legion gradually declined, and it broke apart on 3 March 1861.

== History ==
The Matese Legion was an unconventional legion in that it was created after a number of Garibaldian volunteers joined together with the aim of tearing down the Bourbon power in Piedmont and supporting the Southern Army of Garibaldi as it proceeded in its advance from Sicily to Rome. 1107 Garibaldian volunteers had left Genoa to reach Sicily on 5 May 1860, guided by Garibaldi and Nino Bixio, an Italian general, as second in command. Their aim was to gain the approval of the population in order to take away power from the various insurrectionary movements in the southern regions of the country.

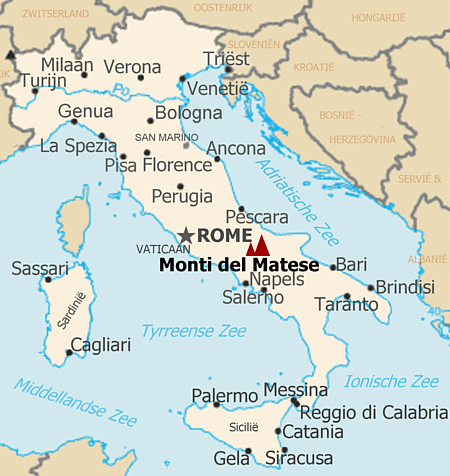
Location of Matese mountains

After seeing the success that the Garibaldian campaign was having in Sicily, Beniamino Caso realized the value in creating a military troop to rebel against the Bourbon power, and in June 1860 in Piedimonte he assembled a group of liberal volunteers with the aim of overthrowing it. Originally nameless, the group was soon dubbed the Matese Legion by individuals in Turin, and the name was eventually adopted by all.

On 18 August, Beniamino Caso and Pasquale Casella travelled to Naples to personally pick up the weapons and the flag of the newly born legion. The two entered Piedimonte Matese on the night of 24 August 1860 with the flag, 100 rifles and 12 boxes of ammunition, and the following morning the legion was officially constituted. The legion was organised into two different parties based upon the volunteers' area of origin, with the first party including the sections of Alvignano, Dragoni, S. Angelo d'Alife, Raviscanina e Piedimonte; the second one included the sections of S.Maria Capua Vetere, San Lorenzello and Calvi. From Piedimonte, the legion, under the command of Major De Blasiis, departed on 31 August for Benevento. He entered the city on 3 September, welcomed by the population after having been liberated from seven centuries of pontifical rule.

Throughout the period of unification, in addition to their participation in numerous battles, the legion was used to suppress brigandage and to provide public security alongside the authorities.

== Battles ==
=== Battle of Caiazzo ===
Between 19 and 21 September 1860, the Garibaldian armies fought against part of the Army of the Kingdom of the Two Sicilies in Caiazzo. The Battle began on 19 September, when the Garibaldian Column, guided by the Hungarian Csudafy, approached the town of Caiazzo. On 20 September, over 300 members of the Matese Legion joined Csudafy's Army. On 21 September the legion, under Csudafy, fought unsuccessfully alongside the Garibaldian Column against the Bourbon Army, which conquered and set fire to Caiazzo. This early defeat prepared the Garibaldian Army for the following battle.

=== Battle of Piedimonte ===
The Garibaldian Column, guided by Csudafy, entered Piedimonte Matese on the night of 22 September 1860 to assist the legion with this battle. The Bourbon army consisted of 3000 men and 3 cannons, while the Garibaldians had only approximately 200 men. The latter were forced to find refuge in the Matese mountains, leaving the city to the enemy, who successfully conquered it on 25 September.

=== Battle of Volturnus ===
The Battle of the Volturnus (1860) refers to a series of military clashes between Garibaldi's volunteers and the troops of the Kingdom of Two Sicilies. It occurred around the river Volturno, in Capua, situated in the province of Caserta in northern Campania, between 26 September and 2 October 1860. The success of the Garibaldian troops in liberating Piedimonte was evidenced in the battle, where 191 volunteers of the Matese Legion participated, under the command of Major Guadagni.

=== Battle of Isernia ===
Following the Battle of Volturnus, the 180 surviving members of the Matese Legion prepared to return to battle against some Bourbon troops that were based in Isernia. On 15 October, they joined an army led by the Colonel Francesco Nullo, which consisted of 1160 volunteers. They began to move towards Isernia with the aim of conquering the city and, in this way, being the advance guard of the Garibaldian army in the region. Colonel Nullo was confident in the power of his army, but on 17 October they were defeated by the enemy, with 64 dead and 95 prisoners. The Matese Legion lost approximately thirty soldiers.

== End of the Matese Legion ==
Following the end of the war for Italian Unification, all volunteers were released from service following a decree by Victor Emmanuel II. On 3 March 1861, the Matese Legion reunited for the last time in Caserta in front of the Mayor Giuliano Amato Giaquinto, in order to return their weapons. Colonel Francesco Materazzo asked the members to join the newly formed Italian army, but all declined the offer and disbanded.

== Significant People ==
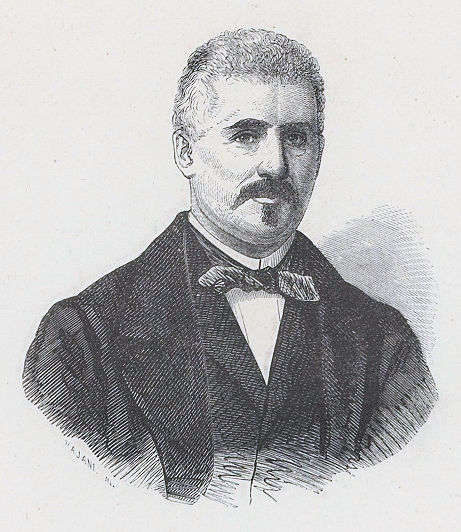
Beniamino Caso

The Matese Legion was founded by Beniamino Caso and Bonaventura Campagnano, who were in charge of recruiting all the volunteers in the district and in other localities within the province. The fighters recognized Beniamino Caso and Salvatore Pizzi as the leaders of the insurrectionary movement in Terra di Lavoro.

Giuliano Iannotta was the Capitan of the Matese Legion, while Giuseppe de Blasiis was the Duce sent from Comitato dell'Ordine, tasked with supervising the Matese Legion.

Giuliano Iannotta directed the volunteers during the Battle of Volturnus on 1 October 1860, and kept a journal detailing the events of the battle. During this battle, the legion was commanded by a Florentine officer, Major Guadagno Guadagni. The established young painter Gioacchino Toma was a member of the legion.

== The Matese Legion Today ==
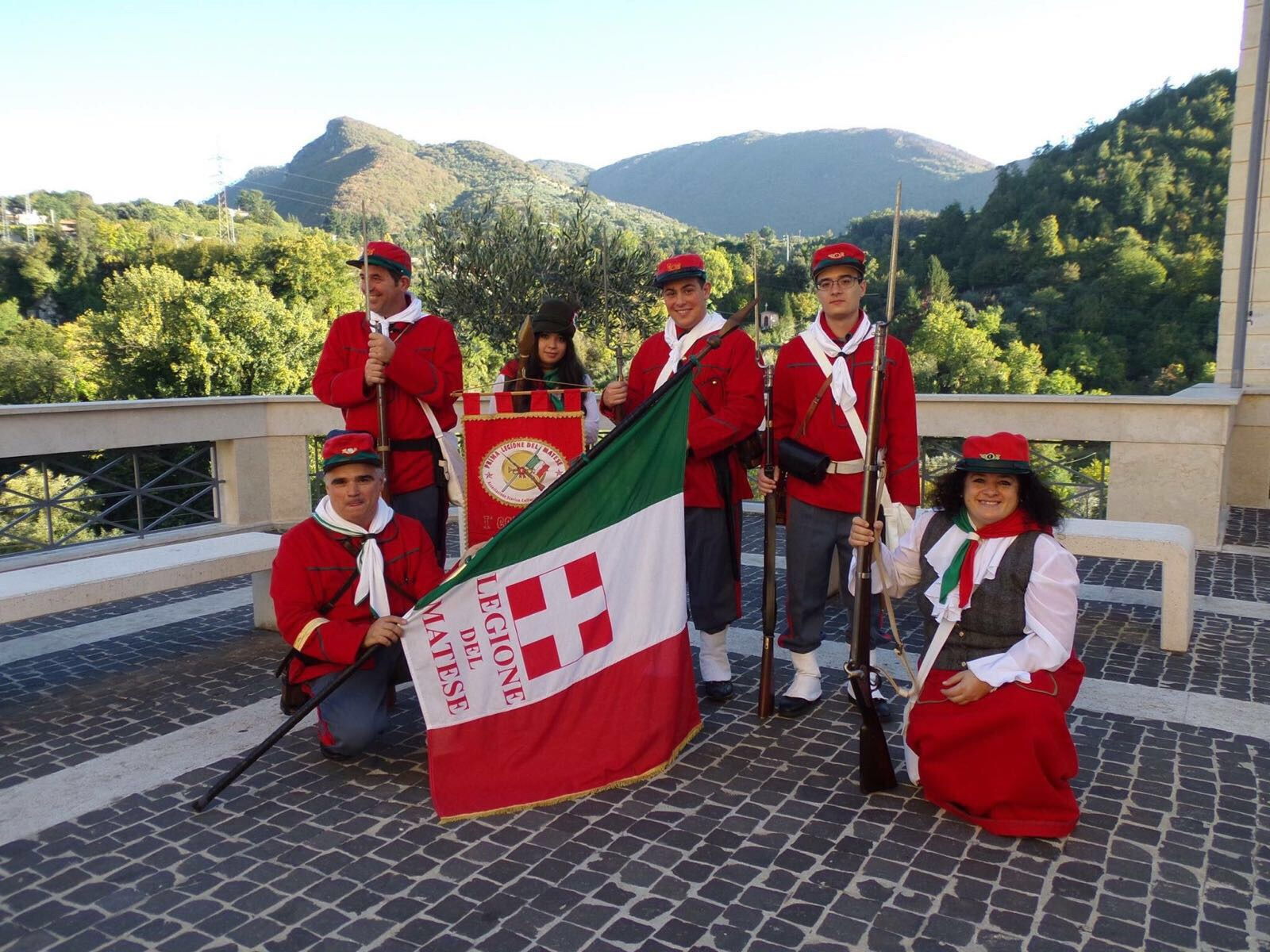
The Matese Legion Today

"First Matese Legion" is an historical Garibaldine association that commemorates the Legion by re-enacting important historical events.

They stage events in cities across Italy, particularly in Rome, in order to share the history and spread awareness and knowledge of the Matese Legion. The Matese Legion's flag was preserved and is stored in the museum of Piedimonte Matese. There is a commemorative tombstone with the names of the most important members of the legion. This is located in the town hall, and every year on 4 November the Mayor, followed by a parade, places a crown under the tombstone. The city of Piedimonte Matese is deeply entwined with the legion, with many streets named after important members, such as Pietro Romagnoli and the bishop Gennaro di Giacomo, both of whom played an important role in encouraging the formation of the legion. The founder of the legion, Beniamino Caso, is commemorated in Piedimonte Matese in various ways. There is a palace which carries his name, where an epigraph testifies to the formation of the legion in this particular palace on 25 August 1860. Additionally, in San Gregorio Matese, his native town, the major square is called "Piazza Beniamino Caso".

== See also ==
- Giuseppe Garibaldi
- Italian unification
- Victor Emmanuel II
- Camillo Benso, Count of Cavour
- Francis II of the Two Sicilies
- Francesco Nullo
- San Gregorio Matese
- Piedimonte Matese
- Matese
- Caiazzo
- Caserta
- Terra di lavoro
- Kingdom of Naples
- House of Bourbon
- Battle of Volturnus
