= Luis Alfageme =

Argentine footballer (born 1984)

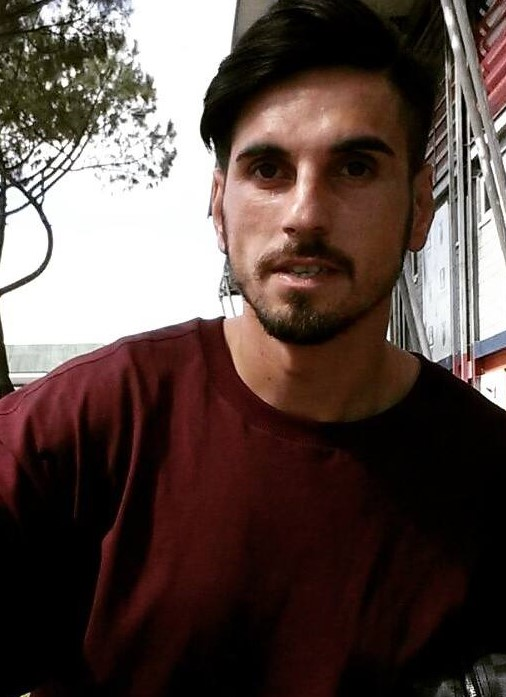

Personal information
- Full name: Luis Maria Alfageme
- Date of birth: 17 December 1984 (age 41)
- Place of birth: La Pampa, Argentina
- Height: 1.91 m (6 ft 3 in)
- Position: Forward

Team information
- Current team: F.C. Matese
- Number: 11

Youth career
- Cipolletti
- 2003–2004: Brescia

Senior career*
Years	Team	Apps	(Gls)
2004–2009	Brescia	6	(0)
2005–2006	→ Acireale (loan)	26	(5)
2007	→ Cremonese (loan)	10	(0)
2007–2008	→ Pescara (loan)	10	(1)
2008	→ Sambenedettese (loan)	6	(0)
2008–2009	→ Lanciano (loan)	28	(2)
2009–2012	Grosseto	73	(11)
2012–2014	Ternana	48	(6)
2014–2015	Benevento	31	(6)
2015–2016	Casertana	27	(10)
2016–2017	Padova	33	(3)
2017–2019	Casertana	46	(11)
2019–2020	Avellino	35	(3)
2020–2021	Taranto	0	(0)
2021–	F.C. Matese	0	(0)
- * Club domestic league appearances and goals as of 8 March 2020

Luis Maria Alfageme (born 17 December 1984) is an Argentine footballer who plays as a forward for F.C. Matese in Italy's Serie D.

== Club career ==
Alfageme was signed by Serie A club Brescia in June 2003. In the 2005–06 season, he was loaned to Acireale. In January 2007, he returned to Serie C1 with Cremonese (on loan), in the same season he was loaned out to Pescara. In January 2008, Alfageme joined Sambenedettese along with former Pescara teammate Gabriele Bartoletti and Axel Vicentini. In the 2008–09 season, he left for Lanciano along with Vicentini.

In August 2009, Alfageme was signed by Serie B side Grosseto in a co-ownership deal, for a peppercorn fee of €500. He played mainly as a substitute but also scored the winning goal for Grosseto in the Coppa Italia and helped the club advance to the third round.

On 15 January 2019, he was released by Casertana.

On 30 July 2020, he joined Taranto.

On 24 July 2021, he signed for F.C. Matese.
