= Alberto Chiancone =

Italian painter

Alberto Chiancone (26 December 1904–1988) was an Italian painter.

== Biography ==
He was born in Porto Santo Stefano in Tuscany to a family from Naples. They moved back to Naples when he was an adolescent. He enrolled at the Regio Istituto d’Arte, working under Lionello Balestrieri. He earned a diploma in Decorative Painting and Graphic Arts in 1923. That year, he also won an award at the Mostra Internazionale di Arti Decorative Biennale of Monza.

He was linked to a group of artists calling themselves the Gruppo degli Ostinati (Group of Obstinates); including Balestrieri, Franco Girosi, Giovanni Brancaccio, Eugenio Viti, and Francesco Galante; meeting at the Caffè Tripoli at Piazza del Plebiscito; and urging the introduction of Modernist styles into the Neapolitan art circles. In the 1929 he participates at the first Fascist Union's Show of Campania and at the International Exposition of Barcelona.

He became a teacher at Art Institute in 1932 as first assistant to Pietro Barillà, and later Professor of Decorative Painting from 1942 to 1976. Among his many pupils were Guido Tatafiore, Francesco Nazzaro, Albino Ottaiano, Benito Gallo Maresca, Rosario Mazzella, Corrado Morelli, Nicola Marotta, Giuseppe Desiato, and Alfonso De Siena.

He exhibited regularly at the Venice Biennale from 1930 to 1948.
