= San Giuseppe da Copertino, Osimo =

Church building in Osimo, Italy

Coordinates: 43°29′12″N 13°29′00″E

San Giuseppe da Copertino is a Roman Catholic basilica church in the town of Osimo, region of Marche, Italy.

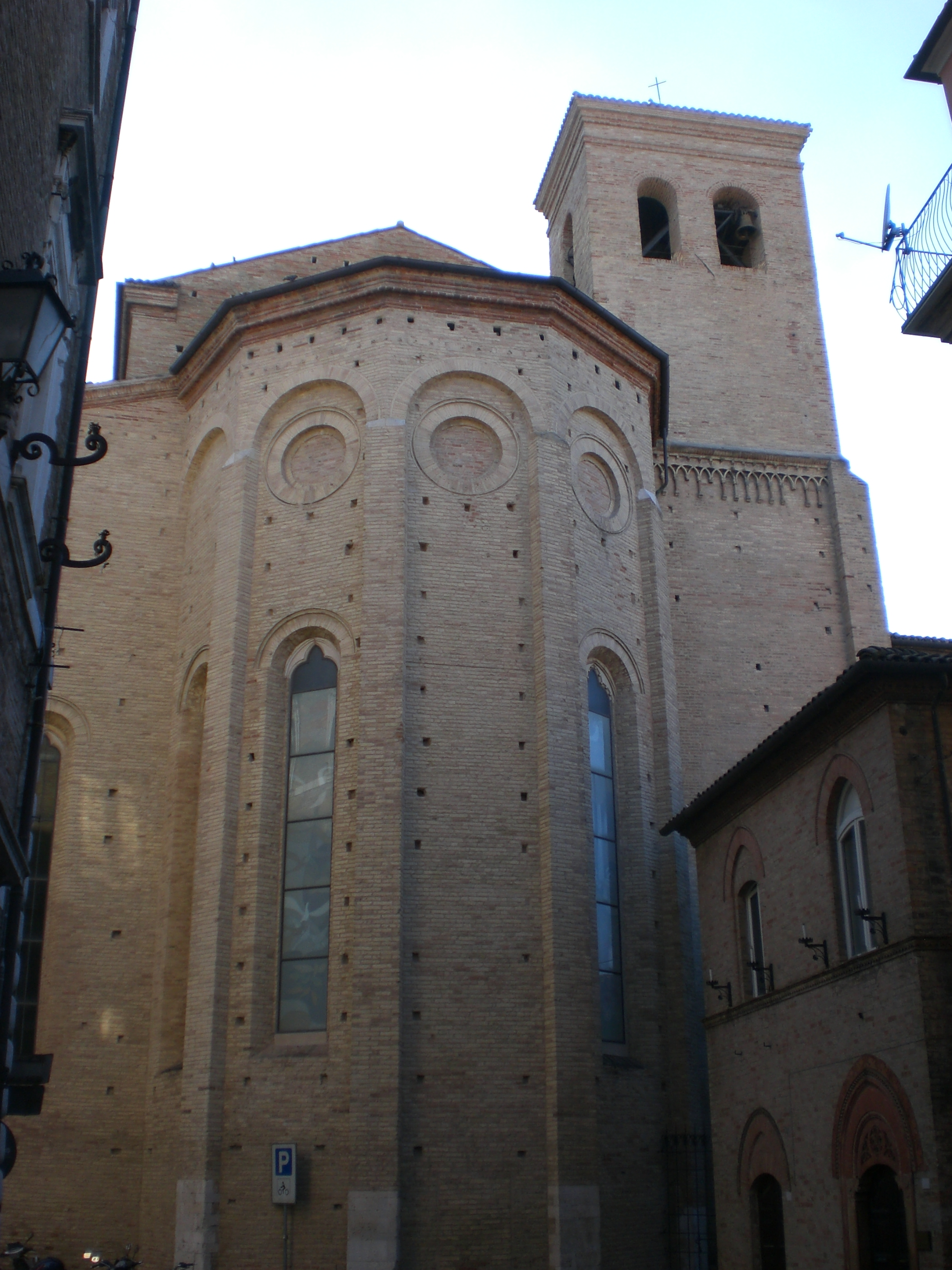
Apse of church

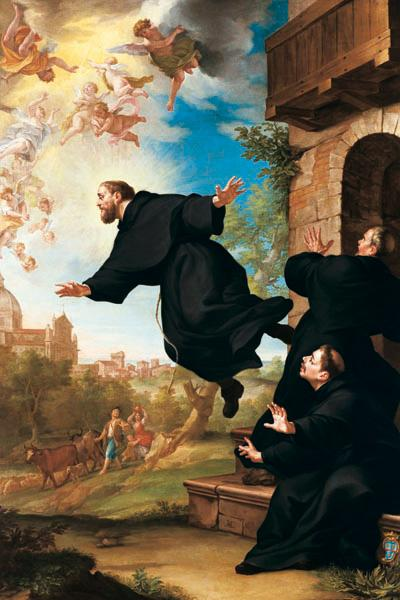
Ecstatic levitation of San Giuseppe at the site of Loreto by Bocchetti.

== History ==
A church at the site, dedicated to St Francis of Assisi, who had visited Osimo in 1215 and 1220, and was consecrated in 1234 in the Gothic-style seen on the outside.

St Joseph of Cupertino was a pious local Franciscan priest, said to have performed miracles, including levitation. He died in 1663 in Osimo, and was beatified in 1753, wherein the Frati Minori Conventuali who were affiliated with the church commissioned refurbishment of the interiors in a Neoclassical-style by the architect Andrea Vici. After canonization, his remains were placed under the main altar in 1771; they are now housed in a crypt constructed in 1963. Gilded angels hold aloft a glass sarcophagus with the Saint in a friar's garb.

The interior of the church houses an Enthroned Madonna and Saints by Antonio Solario, and a Crucifixion by Francesco Solimena. The latter painting was moved here in 1893 from the tower of Palazzo Comunale. The quarters of the saint in the adjacent monastery, where he resided from 1657 to 1663 and his adjacent oratory, are open to visitors. During 1933-1937, Gaetano Bocchetti frescoed the apse with a Glory of San Giuseppe, and other walls with Lives of Franciscan Saints. An altar holds the body of the Blessed Benvenuto Bambozzi (1809 -1875). The Sacristy retains frescoes from the 14th century and a canvas depicting the Ecstasy of San Giuseppe upon visiting the Santa Casa di Loreto (1781) by Mazzanti.
