= Karel Zeman (football manager) =

Italian football coach (born 1977)

Personal information
- Date of birth: 28 February 1977 (age 49)
- Place of birth: Palermo, Italy

Managerial career
- Years: Team
- 2007–2008: Bojano
- 2009: Toma Maglie
- 2010: Toma Maglie
- 2010: Manfredonia
- 2012: Fano
- 2014: Qormi
- 2014–2015: Selargius
- 2015–2016: Abano
- 2016–2017: Reggina
- 2018: Santarcangelo
- 2018: Gela
- 2019–2020: ACR Messina
- 2020–2021: Lavello
- 2021–2023: Lavello
- 2024: Nola
- 2024–2025: Nola
- 2026: Nocerina

Karel Zeman (born 28 February 1977) is an Italian football coach and the son of Czech-born manager Zdeněk Zeman.

== Career ==
Zeman took over at Serie D club Bojano in November 2007, at the age of 30. He resigned in March 2008 due to negative results, after achieving only 12 points in 17 games in charge.

In June 2009 he took over at Eccellenza amateurs Toma Maglie from Apulia. He was then dismissed in November 2009 only to be recalled in January 2010.

In August 2010 he moved to another Eccellenza Puglia club, Manfredonia, only to be sacked later on October.

In March 2012, he took over at Fano in his first role as head coach of a professional club. After guiding the team to safety and being confirmed for one more season, he was however removed from his managerial duties just after the very first game of the season, a 6–0 home loss to Alessandria.

In January 2014 he took over at the helm of Maltese Premier League club Qormi. After keeping the club in the Maltese top flight, he left to accept an offer from Serie D club Selargius; he resigned in May 2015, with the team deep in relegation trouble.

In December 2015, Zeman went back into management at the helm of another Serie D club, Abano. After a good season with Abano, he was offered the head coaching role of fallen giants Reggina; the club, originally scheduled to play in the Serie D, was successively readmitted to Lega Pro to fill a vacancy. He guided them to a safe season and to avoid relegation, and left the club by the end of the season.

He returned to management on 27 March 2018 as the new head coach of relegation-battling Serie C club Santarcangelo until the end of the season. He left the club by the end of the season after succumbing to Vicenza in the relegation playoffs.

In July 2018, he returned to his native Sicily, accepting a head coach role at Serie D club Gela. He resigned from his post on 7 December 2018, mentioning issues at the club level and the unavailability of the local football stadium since the beginning of the season as the reasons for his decision.

In November 2019, Zeman went back into management at the helm of another Sicilian Serie D club, ACR Messina. He resigned on 12 February 2020 due to disagreements with the board.

In July 2020, he took over the reins of newly-promoted Serie D club Lavello. After guiding Lavello to sixth place in the league, Zeman left Lavello by the end of the season. On 11 November 2021, he was rehired as head coach of Lavello.

Zeman parted ways with the club in July 2023 after failing to escape Lavello from relegation by the end of the 2022–23 Serie D season. He successively served as the head coach of Eccellenza Campania amateurs Nola from March to May 2024, and then again from December 2024 to February 2025.

In July 2026, Zeman was appointed new head coach of Serie D club Nocerina. On October 2026, he was dismissed.

== Style of management ==
Like his father Zdenek Zeman's coaching style and attacking football tactics, he supports the 4–3–3 formation.
