= Manél Minicucci =

Italian footballer

Personal information
- Date of birth: 13 May 1995 (age 31)
- Place of birth: Rome, Italy
- Height: 1.81 m (5 ft 11 in)
- Position: Midfielder

Team information
- Current team: Atletico Ascoli

Youth career
- –2010: Atletico Roma
- 2010–2013: Roma
- 2013–2014: Siena
- 2014–2016: Bari

Senior career*
Years	Team	Apps	(Gls)
2015–2016	Bari	1	(0)
2016	→ Hrvatski Dragovoljac (loan)	7	(0)
2016–2018	Fidelis Andria	43	(2)
2018	Monopoli	4	(1)
2018	Vis Artena	5	(0)
2018–2019	Latina Calcio	15	(1)
2019–2020	Agnonese	8	(2)
2020	Matese	5	(1)
2020–2021	Union San Giorgio	28	(3)
2021–2023	Recanatese	51	(6)
2023	Clodiense	8	(3)
2023–	Atletico Ascoli	10	(3)
- * Club domestic league appearances and goals as of 8 October 2023

Manél Minicucci (born 13 May 1995) is an Italian footballer who plays as a midfielder for Serie D club Atletico Ascoli. He also holds Spanish citizenship.

== Club career ==
He made his Serie B debut for Bari on 22 May 2015 in a game against Spezia.

In August 2021, he moved to Serie D club Recanatese. His contract was extended for the next season, on Serie C.

On 1 February 2023, Minicucci signed with Serie D club Clodiense.
