= Enrico Salvatori =

Italian sculptor

Enrico Salvatori (1852 in Naples – ?) was an Italian sculptor.

He studied at the Academy of Naples under the professor Stanislao Lista. In London he exhibited the following works: Diana the Hunter; Pastor fido; Plato; Narcisus; Homer; and Berenice, and obtained a diploma of second class with a silver medal. To a Rome Exposition, he sent Head of Dante which won a bronze medal. In 1885 Paris he exhibited; Brutus and Cicero which won bronze medal and honorable mention respectively. The bust of Cicero was once kept in the Hall of the Council of Lawyers in Naples. In 1888 at Copenhagen, he exhibits: Il Fauno sonante i piattini for which he was awarded diploma of honor, as well as winning awards at exhibitions of Liverpool and Paris. Lastly in 1884 at Turin, he obtained honorable mention for: Un Narciso Pompeiano and Two Cups.
