= Giovanni de Martino =

Italian sculptor

- Born: 3 or 13 January 1870; Naples, Italy
- Died: 3 March 1935; Naples, Italy
- Known for: sculptor
- Notable work: Scodella vuota

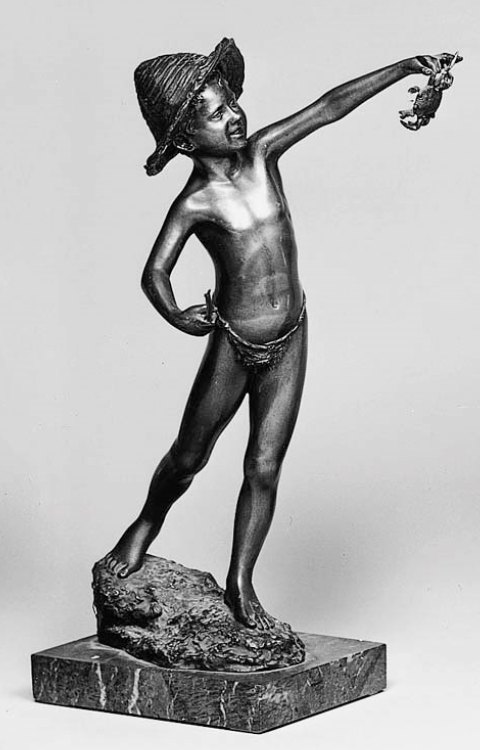
The Shepherd with a Crab, 1916

Giovanni de Martino (3/13 January 1870 – 3 March 1935) was an Italian sculptor. He made sentimental bronzes, often of street boys, fishermen or women.

De Martino was born in Naples on 3 or 13 January 1870, and studied at the Reale Istituto di Belle Arti there, under Gioacchino Toma and Stanislao Lista.

He spent some time in Paris, where he made small groups of figures. In 1900 he won a prize at the Salon de Paris for a bronze of a fisherman. After his return to Naples his work tended towards social realism.

He died in Naples on 3 March 1935.

== Art market ==
At a Sotheby's New York auction in 2008, Giovanni De Martino's Fishermen (1930), a bronze sculpture, was sold for 7.500 US Dollars plus auction fees.
