= Raffaele Armando Califano Mundo =

Italian painter (1857–1930)

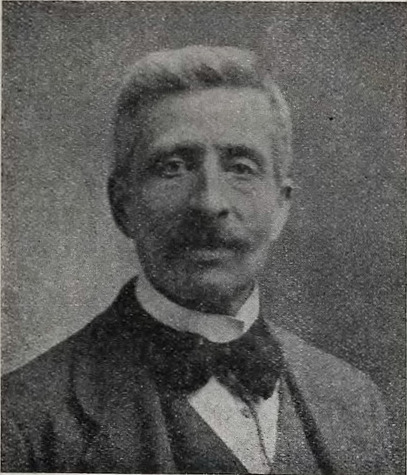
- Born: 23 December 1857
- Died: 1930 (aged 72–73)
- Occupation: Painter

Raffaele Armando Califano Mundo (23 December 1857 in Naples, Kingdom of the Two Sicilies – 1930 in Naples) was an Italian painter.

His first master was the watercolor artist Giovanni Giordano Lanza (1827–1889), then he briefly studied at the Academy of Fine Arts of Naples, then he went to work in the studio under Stanislao Lista. He specialized in interior vedute, including Interno di San Domenico Maggiore a Naples, displayed at the Exhibition of Fine Arts in Turin del 1880 and the 1881 exhibition at Naples. He also painted landscapes and genre. His painting of Mario canvas exhibited at the 1882 Italo-Spanish Exposition in Berlin; his painting Causeries was sold to Augusto Riccardi, Diplomatic Consul of Austria-Hungary in Naples: Cassetta Farnese exhibited at the 1889 Mostra Promotrice of Naples; Quiara and La preghiera nella Moschea displayed at the Mostra Permanente of Rome.

He was also known as an essayist, a career he developed from 1910 onward. He exhibited at the Neapolitan Promotrice until 1911. he was named honorary professor at the Accademia di Napoli in 1902, after which he wrote educational texts about painting.
