= Stanislao Lista =

Italian sculptor (1824–1908)

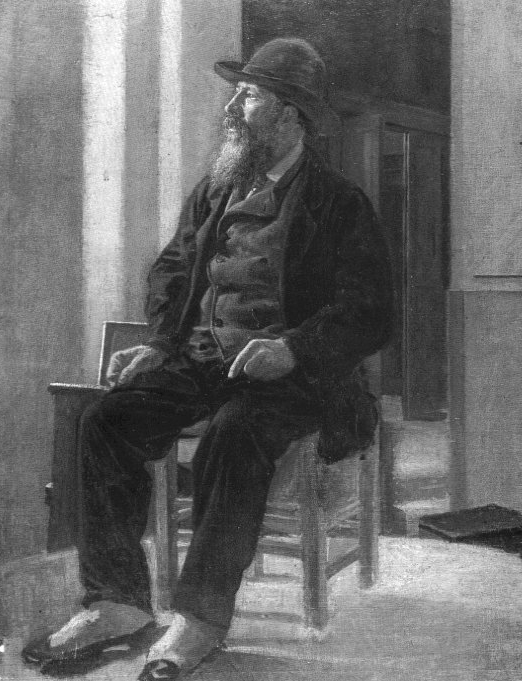
Portrait of Stanislao Lista

Stanislao Lista (8 December 1824 – 1908) was an Italian sculptor active in Naples.

== Biography ==
Stanislao Lista was born on 8 December 1824 in Salerno. He carved one of the four lions in marble in Piazza dei Martiri, Naples. The lion, hit by a sword, is dedicated to the Carbonari soldiers, who died in the wars of 1820. He is author of the angels in the facade of Naples Cathedral who carry the symbols of Saint Januarius, on the tower at the right side, and a large statue of Giovanni Paisiello located in the vestibule of the San Carlo Theater in Naples.

Lista studied design under Giovanni Tamburini of Bologna, and architecture and perspective with his father. After two years of study in Salerno, he traveled to Naples to study under Gaetano Forte, then in the Institute of Fine Arts of Naples. He first exhibited a painting La Phità (1845), which gained him a stipend. In 1852, he exhibited in Naples: David defeats Goliath, which was awarded a first class silver medal. In 1856 he won another prize for a bas-relief: Priam implores from Achilles the cadaver of Hector, which gained him a stipend to work in Rome.

In Rome he was liberated as an artist, focusing on sculpture. He next completed a bas relief of the Last Supper and also a large group: La guarigione del cieco nato; he was awarded a gold medal in Rome for these. He exhibited at the Naples Promotrice. He became Inspector in Naples for City Hall. In 1860 in 10 days he modeled a stucco sculpture of General La Marmora, raised to celebrated the entry of Vittorio Emanuele to Naples. He also completed Il Paisiello, for the theater of San Carlo. In 1869 he completed a wooden Putto for the Prince of Naples. He made a bust of his father, in an impressionist style, exhibited at the Promotrice of Naples, and at the Exhibition of Parma del 1871, then the Mostra internazionale of Paris and of Rome. In 1877 at the national Exposition of Naples he exhibited an Immaculate Conception in wood and designed a Monument to Lord Byron. In 1878, he was nominated Knight of the Order of the Crown of Italy. For the Cathedral of San Gennaro in Naples and for the tower of San Gennaro, he completed reliefs with angels. He completed busts of Raffaele Conforti and Stanislao Mancini for the Tribunal of Naples.

He was teacher at the academy of fine arts in Naples; among his pupils were Enrico Salvatori, Vincenzo Gemito, Francesco Jerace, Ettore Ximenes, Costantino Barbella, Raffaele Armando Califano Mundo, and Antonio Mancini.

His most famous pupil was the Neapolitan sculptor Giovanni de Martino.
