= FWP Matese =

Italian football club

F.W.P. Matese
- Full name: Associazione Sportiva Dilettantistica F.W.P. Matese
- Nickname: Wild Pigs
- Founded: 1 September 2013
- Dissolved: 2020?
- Ground: Stadio Pasqualino Ferrante, Sepicciano, Piedimonte Matese
- Capacity: 4,000 (seated)
- President: Maurizio Di Costanzo
- Manager: Massimo Rossi
- League: Promozione Molise (Girone A)
- 2018–19: Promozione Molise, 12th
Home colours

F.W.P. Matese was an Italian football club based in Sepicciano, Piedimonte Matese, Caserta, Campania. The club had played in both Prima Categoria Molise and Eccellenza Molise.

== History ==
Founded in 2011 as F.W.P. Piedimonte Matese, the club was renamed F.W.P. Matese in 2013. F.W.P. Matese played home fixtures at the Stadio Pasqualino Ferrante, a ground shared with neighbours Tre Pini Matese.

== Nearby clubs ==
Their closest rivals in terms of distance were A.S.D. Alliphae an Alife-based club and then the more established Caserta-based outfit Casertana. The distance between Alife and Piedimonte Matese is about 3.3 miles (5.5 km), whilst Caserta is approximately 24 miles (40 km) away.

== Sponsorship & Kit manufacturer ==
For the 2015–16 season the club's shirts sponsor was Mec.San. The team's home jersey was manufactured by Italian sports brand Givova. The away jersey was produced by Zeus Sport.

== Players ==
=== Non-playing staff ===
Staff

Position	Name
Director	(Italy) Emilio D'Auria
President	(Italy) Maurizio Di Costanzo
Vice president	(Italy) Giuseppe Mercorio
Administrator	(Italy) Gianmarco Ambra
Manager	(Italy) Giuseppe Panella
Assistant coach	(Italy) -
