= Mucirama =

- Interactive map of the Mucirama area

General information
- Type: Monastery / Museum
- Location: Piedimonte Matese, Caserta, Campania, Italy, Via Scalelle, 81016 Piedimonte Matese CE, Italy, Piedimonte Matese, Italy

Website
- http://www.mucirama.it/

The Civic Museum Raffaele Marrocco (Italian: Museo Civico Raffaele Marrocco) known as Mucirama; stylised MuCiRaMa or Mu.Ci.Ra.Ma is an archaeology and arts museum based in the town of Piedimonte Matese in the Province of Caserta, in the Region of Campania, Italy.

== History ==
The complex Dominican monastery which houses the museum was founded in the late 14th century at the foot of the village of San Giovanni. The structure was inserted near the urban fabric in compliance with the intentions of the Order to Participate in the life Town: because Papal Bulls of Boniface IX dating between 1389 and 1404 demonstrate the interest by far arrive in the foothill area the order of St. Dominic.

The convent and the church were built between 1394 and 1414 for Sveva Sanseverino initiative, wife of James II Caetani Eagle and Lady Piedimonte, great-grandson of St. Thomas Aquinas, saint to which they were entitled.

In 1414, the convent and the church was entrusted to the order of Dominicans who remained there until 1809, when the monastery was closed. After the convent was used as a sottintendenza Bourbon and then a sub-prefecture of the Kingdom of Italy. In 1905, he was sent to school building and build upon twenty years later.
