= Costantino Barbella =

Italian sculptor (1853–1925)

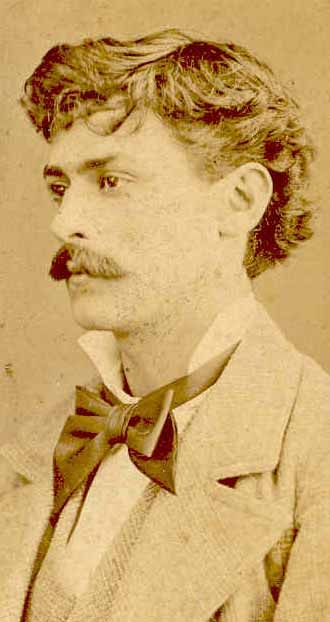
- Born: 31 January 1853; Chieti, Kingdom of the Two Sicilies
- Died: 5 December 1925 (aged 72)
- Education: Istituto di Belle Arti in Naples
- Notable work: La gioia dell ' innocenza, La Canzone d'amore, La Confidenza

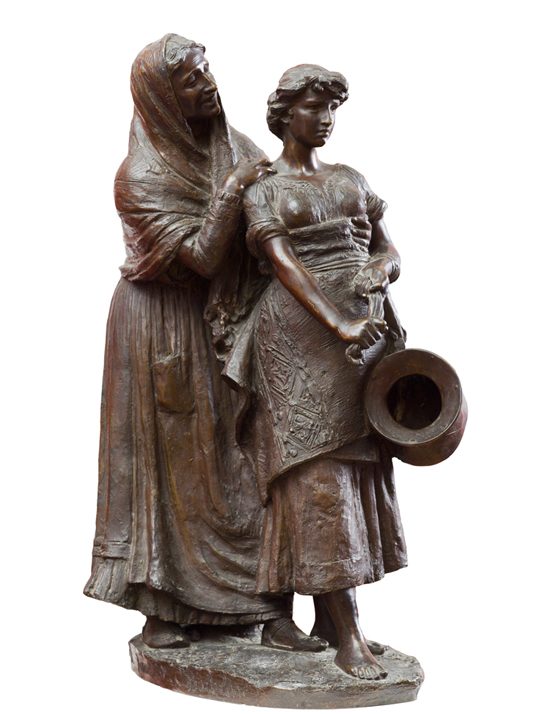
Sculpture made by Costantino Barbella

Costantino Barbella (31 January 1853, in Chieti – 5 December 1925) was an Italian sculptor, known as il Michetti della scultura.

He began his career by modelling terracotta figurines for churches and Nativity Scenes (Presepe). In 1872, Francesco Paolo Michetti encouraged him to use a stipend from the province to study at the Istituto di Belle Arti in Naples. He studied there with Stanislao Lista. He was highly prolific in creating small terracotta and bronze statuary, much of it depicting country folk dancing or in animated movement. He also made a few portraits, including of Pope Leo XIII. His work was exhibited throughout Europe, commonly winning awards. He was named cavaliere dell' Order of Leopold II of Belgium, honorary professor of the Istituto Reale di Belle Arti in Naples, and honorary academician at the Istituto di Belle Arti di Bologna.

Among his students was Argentinian sculptor Lola Mora.

The "Costantino Barbella" Museum of Art is located in the Palazzo Martinetti Bianchi in Chieti.

== Works ==
- La gioia dell ' innocenza
- La Canzone d'amore (Expositions of Naples, 1877; and Turin, 1884)
- La Confidenza (Exhibition of Paris,1879)
- Alla fontana
- Tentativo
- Bacio
- Storia amorosa
- Paciera
- The departure of the Conscript and The Return of a Soldier (Galleria Moderna di Roma, 1883)
- Aprile (Galleria Moderna di Roma)
- Contatrici
- Onomastico
- Canto d'amore (Song of Love)
- Partenza
- Ritorno
- Idyll
- Le amiche
- Su, su
- Soli
- Credi a me
