= Gaetano Bocchetti =

Italian painter (1888–1990)

Gaetano Bocchetti (10 August 1888 – 1990) was an Italian painter. He was born in Naples and studied at the Academy of Fine Arts of Naples. He participated in a number of exhibitions, including the 1920 Venice Biennale, the 1921 Quadriennale of Rome, and from 1923 at the national Biennale of Naples. He exhibited at a Florentine exhibition by Sembenelli, in 1926 at the Quadriennale of Turin, and gained the premio Cremona in 1935–36, the premio Michetti in 1965, and the premio Posillipo in 1965.

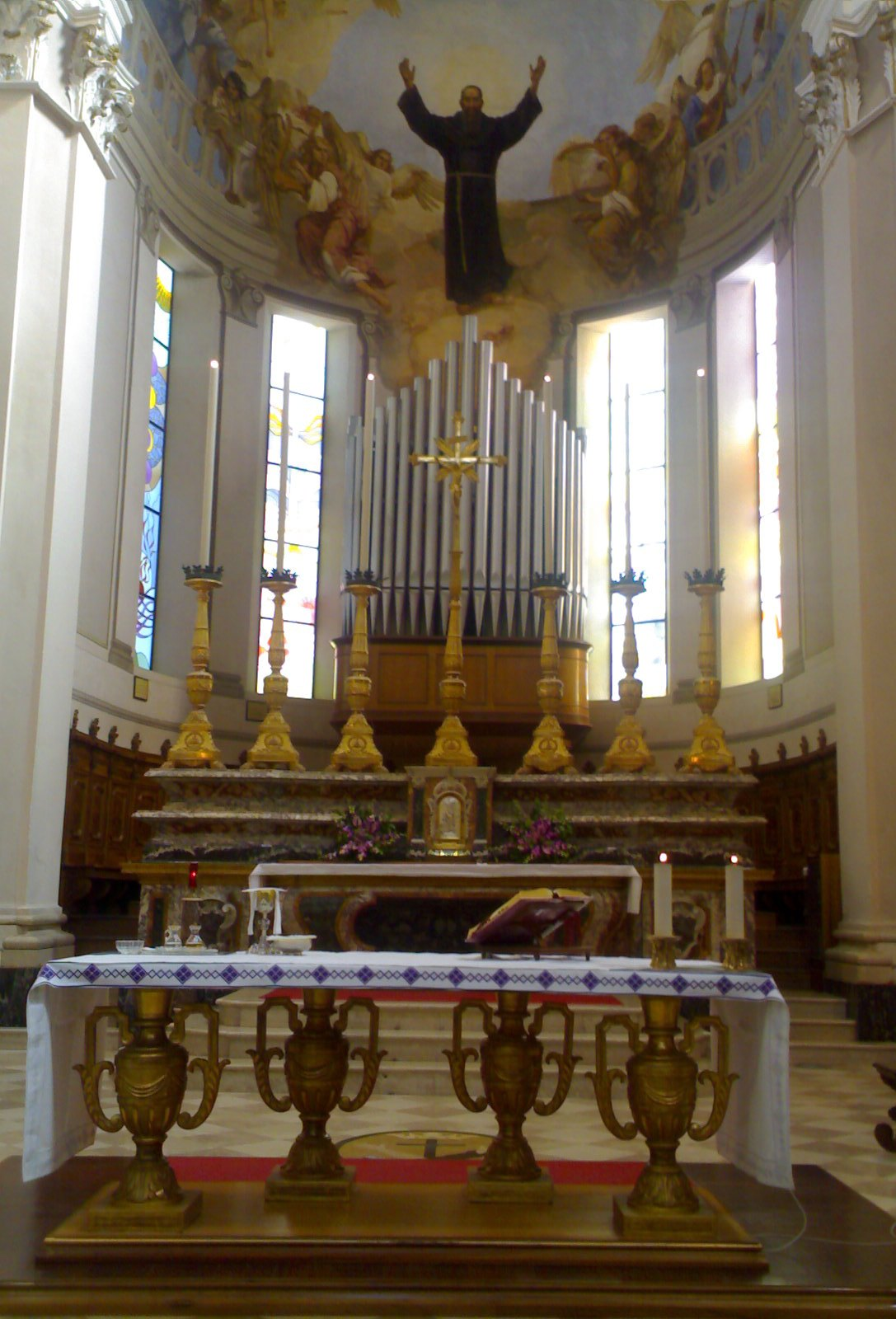
Glory of San Giuseppe da Copertino at apse of church

He frescoed the interior of the Basilica of Giuseppe da Copertino, Osimo.
