= Giovanni Brancaccio =

Italian painter (1903–1975)

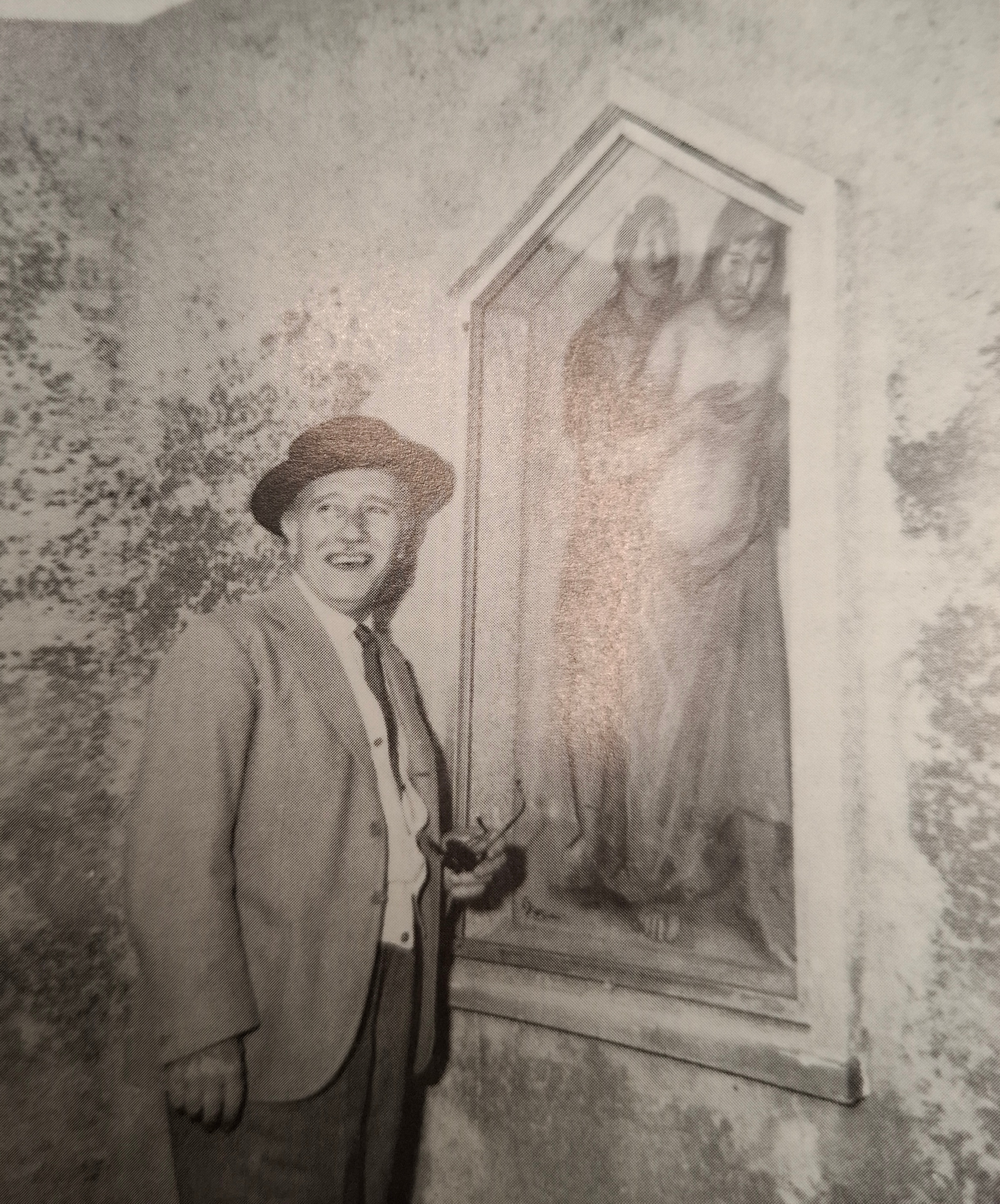
- Giovanni Brancaccio in Arcumeggia
- Born: 12 February 1903; Pozzuoli, Italy
- Died: 12 February 1975 (aged 72); Naples, Italy
- Occupation: Italian painter
- Spouse(s): Luisa Chiarazzo (1935), Diana Luise (1943)
- Website: http://www.giovannibrancaccio.it/

Giovanni Brancaccio (Pozzuoli, 1903 – Naples, 12 February 1975) was an Italian painter.

== Biography ==
After an apprenticeship as a mechanical draughtsman at the Armstrong armaments factory in Pozzuoli, he took Graphics and Decoration courses at the Academy of Fine Arts of Naples, gaining his diploma in 1923. He was the set designer and stage director for the De Filippo brothers’ theatre company from 1927 to 1939.

In the early 1920s, he affiliated himself with artists such as Biagio Mercadante, Vincenzo Ciardo, De Val, and Nicola Fabricatore, in a group known as the Gruppo Flegreo. Soon however he became linked to a group of artists calling themselves the Gruppo degli Ostinati (Group of Obstinates); including Balestrieri, Franco Girosi, Alberto Chiancone, Eugenio Viti, and Francesco Galante; meeting at the Caffè Tripoli at Piazza del Plebiscito; and urging the introduction of Modernist styles into the Neapolitan art circles.

He actively exhibited his paintings and engravings during the 1920s and 1930s, including the Venice Biennale in 1928 and 1938 (where a room was devoted to him) and the Rome Quadriennale (with his own room in 1943 and 1955). He also held many academic posts, including the Chair of Engraving, and later that of Set Design and Painting, at the Naples Academy of Fine Arts, of which he was director from 1950 to 1970. He won various awards, including the Bagutta and the Michetti Prizes in 1959.

In the thirties he completed sketches and large-scale works with provocative depictions of female nudes in landscapes rich immersed in water and scrub. Belong to this period: Country Scene (1939), Girl in the Mirror (1939) Naked (1940), Young girl playing the mandolin (1940) and Figures (1941). The theme of 'bathers', from 1940 onwards, the applicant becomes even during the war, there is a dramatic development.

== Bibliography ==
- Laura Casone, Giovanni Brancaccio, online catalogue Artgate by Fondazione Cariplo, 2010, CC BY-SA (source for the first revision of this article).
