= ASD Tre Pini Matese =

Italian football club

Tre Pini Matese
- Full name: Associazione Sportiva Dilettantistica Tre Pini Piedimonte Matese
- Nicknames: I Biancoverdi (The White-and-Greens)
- Founded: 2012
- Dissolved: 2020
- Ground: Stadio Pasqualino Ferrante, Sepicciano, Piedimonte Matese
- Capacity: 1,200 (seated)
- President: Marcellino Pepe
- Manager: Alfonso Camorani
- League: Eccellenza Molise (Girone A)
- 2019–20: Eccellenza Molise, 2nd
- Website: http://www.trepinimatese.it
Home colours	Away colours

Associazione Sportiva Dilettantistica Tre Pini Matese (Italian pronunciation: [assotʃatˈtsjoːne sporˈtiːva dilettanˈtistika tre ˈpiːni maˈteːze]) was an Italian association football club based in Sepicciano, Piedimonte Matese, Caserta, Campania. Although based in Campania, the club were members of Promozione Molise and Eccellenza Molise.

== History ==
The club was founded in 2012 as A.S.D. Tre Pini Sporting Matese, but would later drop the word "Sporting" from its name and become known as A.S.D. Tre Pini Matese. Tre Pini Matese played home fixtures at the Stadio Pasqualino Ferrante, a ground shared with neighbours F.W.P. Matese. Tre Pini Sporting Matese was admitted to Prima Categoria for the 2012–13 season, winning promotion to Promozione Molise after finishing as champions and recording a total of 76 points from 30 games. During the 2015–16 season, Tre Pini finished as runners-up to Polisportiva Gioventù Calcio Dauna in Eccellenza Molise. There was some controversy over Dauna and U.S. Venafro's involvement in a corruption scandal. As a result of this, several representatives of Gioventù Dauna received fines ranging from €5,000 to €10,000, while the other accused club, Venafro, was fined a sum of €4,000. Dauna's first-place finish was awarded, to second-placed Tre Pini, with the accused club; set to remain in Eccellenza for the subsequent campaign. Consequently, Tre Pini; was temporarily admitted to Serie D for the 2016–17 season. However, following this decision, a federal tribunal found Dauna innocent of any wrongdoing and its title and subsequent promotion; was restored, placing Tre Pini Matese back in Eccellenza.

== Cup run ==
The 2013–14 season saw the club compete in the Coppa Italia Dilettanti Molise for the first time in its history. Tre Pini failed to make it past the group stage. The following season, the team qualified for the semi-finals of the cup. And this was mirrored in the 2015–16 season. The 2016–17 season saw them top their group; and reach the quarter-finals of the tournament. However, Tre Pini would fall to a (6–5 aggregate defeat) after winning the home leg 3–2, then losing 2–4 away to Isernia.

== Colors and club crest ==
Tre Pini's home colours were green and white. The club's badge depicted three pine trees atop three peaks paid homage to the town Piedimonte Matese and the surrounding area in the mountainous region of Campania in Southern Italy.

== Nearby clubs ==
Their closest rivals in terms of distance were A.S.D. Alliphae, an Alife-based club, and then the more established Caserta-based outfit Casertana. The distance between Alife and Piedimonte Matese is about 3.3 miles (5.5 km), whilst Caserta is approximately 24 miles (40 km) away.

== Matches ==
Tre Pini Matese twice met local rivals Casertana in the same calendar year, with the first encounter coming on 11 February 2016, when they hosted a friendly against Casertana, which saw I Falchetti run out 10−0 winners. Following their crushing defeat back in February, a rematch was contested at Tre Pini's - Stadio Pasqualino Ferrante; on 21 August during the 2016−17 pre-season. Goals from Matmute and Giorno were enough to give the away side a second successive victory over their rivals.

== Sponsorship and kit manufacturers ==
Tre Pini Matese's home and away kits were produced by Italian international sports brand Zeus Sports and, their shirts sponsor was 'Città di Piedimonte Matese'.

== Players ==
=== Current squad ===
As of 20 February 2020

Note: Flags indicate national team as defined under FIFA eligibility rules; some limited exceptions apply. Players may hold more than one non-FIFA nationality.

No.	Pos.	Nation	Player
—	GK	ITA	Danilo Gallone
—	GK	ITA	Silvano Romagnini
—	GK	ITA	Giuseppe Napolitano
—	DF	ITA	Samuel Catapane
—	DF	ITA	Gianmarco Aldi
—	DF	ITA	Luigi Marocco
—	DF	ITA	Orlando Paolella
—	DF	ITA	Antonio Riccio
—	DF	ITA	Luigi Santomassimo
—	DF	ITA	Nicola Vecchio
—	DF	ITA	Giorgio Scognamiglio
—	MF	ITA	Alfonso Camorani
—	MF	ITA	Luca Ferrante
—	MF	ITA	Stanislao Iodice
—	MF	ITA	Davide Ianelli

No.	Pos.	Nation	Player
—	MF	ITA	Alessio Langellotti
—	MF	ITA	Liberato Di Nardo
—	MF	ITA	Calolgero Intorto
—	MF	ITA	Francesco Paolella
—	MF	ITA	Walter Ricci
—	MF	ITA	Alessandro Santagelo
—	MF	ITA	Nicola Vecchio
—	FW	ITA	Luigi Ciardiello
—	FW	ITA	Marco Di Matteo
—	FW	UKR	Sviatoslav Tudovshi

=== Former players ===
- (Italy) Marco Di Baia
- (Italy) Federico Barile
- (Italy) Nicolas Barone
- (Italy) Simone Carpentino
- (Italy) Guido Cinicola
- (Italy) Francesco Cristillo
- (Italy) Claudio Di Domenico
- (Italy) Vincenzo Fappiano
- (Italy) Luigi Rega
- (Italy) Simone Marra
- (Italy) Raffaele Di Nardo
- (Italy) Domenico D'Ovidio
- (Italy) Pietro Pacilio
- (Italy) Vittorio Pellegrino
- (Italy) Alessio Raucci
- (Italy) Gianmarco Raviele
- (Italy) Alessandro Ferrante
- (Italy) Daniele Napoletano
- (Italy) Stefano Di Sorbo
- (Italy) Vincenzo Varricchione
- (Italy) Giuseppe Zotti

=== Player records ===
Most goals Daniele Napoletano – 119 : 2014–15, 2015–16, 2016–17

Most goals in one season Daniele Napoletano – : 43 : 2015–16, 2016–17

=== Non-playing staff ===
Staff

Position	Name
Director	(Italy) Carlo Loffreda
President	(Italy) Marcellino Pepe
Vice president	(Italy) Maurizio Costarella
Manager	(Italy) Alfonso Camorani
Assistant coach	(Italy) Ciro Gomma
Goalkeeping coach	(Italy) Silvano Romagnini
Physiotherapist	(Italy) Massimo Buonpane

== Club honours ==
=== Domestic ===
==== League ====
Prima Categoria (Girone A)

- Winners: 2012−13

Promozione Molise

- Winners: 2013−14

Eccellenza Molise

- Runners-up: 2015–16

==== Cup ====
- Coppa Italia Dilettanti Molise

- Winners (2): 2018–19, 2019–20

Period	Kit manufacturer	Shirt sponsor
2012–	Kappa / Zeus	Città di Piedimonte Matese / Mobili Sparaco

=== Managers ===
- (Italy) Mario Morra (2014–2016)
- (Italy) Alessandro Cagnale (2016–2017)
- (Italy) Marco Palazzo (2016–2017)
- (Italy) Ernesto Geloso (2017)
- (Italy) Silvano Romagnini (2017–2019)
- (Italy) Alfonso Camorani (2019–2020)

== Club records ==
Longest winning run

- 10 matches

Longest home winning streak

- 14 matches

Biggest wins

- Home
  - 8–1 against Cliternina, 18 December 2016 (Eccellenza Molise)
  - 8–1 against Turris Santangiolese, 10 March 2013 (Prima Categoria)
  - 7–0 against Forulum, 16 December 2012 (Prima Categoria)
  - 6–0 against Cerro Al Volturno, 24 March 2013 (Prima Categoria)
  - 6–1 against Aurora Pizzone, 14 October 2012 (Prima Categoria)
  - 5–2 against Spinete, 3 December 2016 (Eccellenza Molise)
  - 5–1 against Atletico Sant. Agapito, 13 January 2013 (Prima Categoria)
  - 4–0 against Pesche, 20 January 2013 (Prima Categoria)
  - 4–0 against Civitanova, 14 April 2013 (Prima Categoria)
  - 4–1 against San Pietro Avellana, 21 October 2012 (Prima Categoria)
  - 4–2 against Atletico Sanniti, 4 November 2012 (Prima Categoria)
- Away
  - 1–5 against Bagnolese, 9 December 2012 (Prima Categoria)
  - 0–5 against Alliphae, 14 January 2017 (Eccellenza Molise)

Biggest losses

- Home
  - 0−10 against Casertana, 11 February 2016 (pre-season friendly)
- Away
  - 4–0 against Montenero, 21 April 2013 (Prima Categoria)
  - 4–2 against Forulum, 5 May 2013 (Prima Categoria)
