= ASD Forza e Coraggio =

Italian football club

- Full name: Associazione Sportiva Dilettantistica Forza & Coraggio Bn
- Founded: 1972
- Ground: Stadio Mellusi, Benevento, Italy
- Chairman: Massimo Taddeo
- Manager: Antonello Mauro
- League: Promozione Campania 2022-2023
- Promozione Campania, 4th
Home colours	Away colours

Associazione Sportiva Dilettantistica Forza e Coraggio is an Italian association football club, based in Benevento, Campania.

Forza e Coraggio currently plays in Promozione Campania.

== History ==
The club was founded in 1972.

=== Serie D 2010–11 ===
In the season 2010–11, the team qualified for the national finals play-off for promotion to the Lega Pro Seconda Divisione but was eliminated.

=== Seconda Categoria 2011–12 ===
On 14 June 2011, President Massimo Taddeo announced the termination of participation in Serie D, but the team didn't lose titles won in the Seconda Categoria Campania for the 2011–12 season.

=== Prima Categoria 2012–13 ===
In the 2012–13 season, Forza & Coraggio participated in the championship of the first category (group B), winning with a goal to advance their group and move up in the league table.

=== Promozione 2013–14 ===
After the victory in the championship of the first category, in the 2013–14 season, Forza & Coraggio is preparing to play in the League for Promotion. Return the various big, including Filippo Tortora, Alessio Befi and Raffaele Capone. After a slow start not entirely positive, the team Beneventana gleaned more points from Sporting Guard, Montesarchio and St. Thomas and with three days in advance won the same championship. The pair of attack Tortora-Befi struck 60 goals in the whole season, a season record.

=== Eccellenza 2014–15 ===
In June of the same year, President Thaddeus threw in the towel and announced that he couldn't enter the team to the championship of Excellence. After a long afterthought, the patron Giallorossi, recharge the batteries and start again stronger than before. A Benevento, at the court of Antonello Mauro new coach (former coach of the Forza youth sector) land-caliber players, such as various Lepre, Zotti, Monticelli and Russo. The preparation part 4 August on synthetic Mellusi. In contemporary is set up a good team pearl Juniores Regionale, coached by the duo Cioffi-Errico.

Promozione 2022-23

Actually the team is playing in promozione, sixth Italian League

== Colors and badge ==
The team's colors are red and yellow.

The first mesh used by Forza & Coraggio was a yellow and red striped uniform. As for the away shirt, the uniform is white with red shorts and white socks. The third split of the game is entirely black, red and yellow with a vertical strip.

=== Sponsor ===
MASS
