= Polisportiva Olympia Agnonese =

Italian football club

Olympia Agnonese
- Full name: Polisportiva Olympia Agnonese
- Founded: 1967
- Ground: Stadio Comunale, Agnone, Italy
- Capacity: 4,000
- Chairman: Antonio Melloni
- Manager: Mauro Marinelli
- League: Serie D/F
- 2017–18: 13th
Home colours	Away colours

Polisportiva Olympia Agnonese is an Italian association football club, based in Agnone, Molise. Olympia Agnonese currently plays in Serie D.

== History ==
The club was founded in 1967.

== Colors and badge ==
The team's colors are all-dark red.
