= Piedimonte Matese =

- Comune
- Comune di Piedimonte Matese
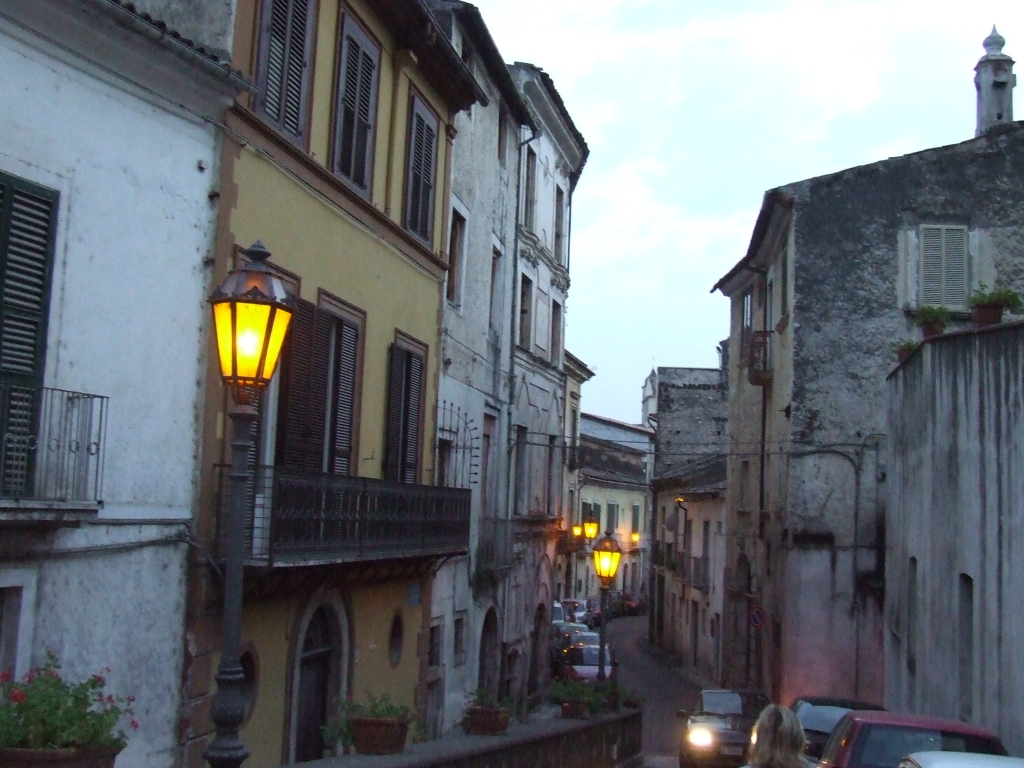

- Coat of arms

- Location within Italy Location within Campania
- Coordinates: 41°21′N 14°21′E
- Country: Italy
- Region: Campania
- Province: Caserta (CE)
- Frazioni: Sepicciano

Government
  - Mayor: Vittorio Civitillo

Area
  - Total: 41.3 km^{2} (15.9 sq mi)
- Elevation: 165 m (541 ft)

Population (31 March 2017)
  - Total: 11,117
  - Density: 269/km^{2} (697/sq mi)
- Demonym: Piedimontesi
- Time zone: UTC+1 (CET)
  - Summer (DST): UTC+2 (CEST)
- Postal code: 81016
- Dialing code: 0823
- Patron saint: St. Marcellino
- Saint day: 2 June
- Website: Official website

Piedimonte Matese (pronounced [ˌpjɛdiˈmonte maˈteːze, -eːse]) is a comune (municipality) in the Province of Caserta in the Italian region of Campania, located about 82 km north of Naples and about 40 km north of Caserta.

== Geography ==
Piedimonte Matese borders the following municipalities: Alife, Campochiaro, Castello del Matese, Cusano Mutri, Guardiaregia, San Gregorio Matese, San Potito Sannitico and Sant'Angelo d'Alife. Up until 1945, Piedimonte Matese was located within the Province of Benevento. Before 1970, Piedimonte was known as Piedimonte d'Alife.

== History ==
The Matese Legion was a group of 240 Italian volunteers that joined Giuseppe Garibaldi in the war for Italian unification in 1861. It was formed in the Piedimonte D'Alife district, now called Piedimonte Matese, in June 1860, and was officially established on 25 August in the same year.

== Main sights ==
The church of San Biagio (15th century) houses late-Gothic frescoes with scenes from the Old and New Testament and histories of St. Blaise. The church of St. Thomas (or St. Dominic) was built in 1414. The Baroque church of San Salvatore was designed by Cosimo Fanzago. The Ducal Palace of Gaetani d'Aragona has kept some late Renaissance details. Its patron saint is San Marcellino. The church of Ave Gratia Plena, also known as the Church of the Annunciation (Chiesa dell’Annunziata), retains much of its Baroque decoration.

The Civic Museum Raffaele Marrocco is an archaeology and arts museum in Piedimonte Matese.

== Sports ==
=== Association football ===
Based in the Sepicciano area of Piedimonte Matese is the 4,000-seater Stadio Pasqualino Ferrante, a municipal stadium and home of Serie D (Girone F) club A.S.D. Football Club Matese. It was formerly the home of Eccellenza (Molise) club A.S.D. Tre Pini Matese and Promozione (Molise) side F.W.P. Matese.

== International relations ==
Piedimonte Matese is twinned with:

- Cervinara, Italy, since 2013
- Seligenstadt, Germany, since 2010
