= Sepicciano =

- Frazione
- Interactive map of Sepicciano
- Coordinates: 41.3491°N 14.3817°E
- Country: Italy
- Region: Campania
- Province: Caserta (CE)
- Comune: Piedimonte Matese
- Demonym: Sepiccianari
- Time zone: UTC+1 (CET)
  - Summer (DST): UTC+2 (CEST)
- Dialing code: (+39) 0823

Sepicciano is a frazione of the municipality of Piedimonte Matese, in Campania, Southern Italy.
