= USD Lavello =

Italian association football club

Lavello
- Full name: Polisportiva Football Club; Lavello
- Nicknames: Gialloverdi, Ofantini
- Founded: 1932
- Ground: Stadio Franco Pisicchio, Lavello, Italy
- Capacity: 1,200
- Chairman: Vincenzo Caputo
- Manager: Massimo Gallo
- League: Eccellenza Basilicata
- 2023–24: Eccellenza Basilicata, 5th
Home colours	Away colours

Unione Sportiva Dilettantistica Lavello is an Italian association football club located in Lavello, Basilicata. It currently plays in Eccellenza Basilicata. Its colors are green and yellow.
