= Greco (surname) =

Greco (Italian pronunciation: [ˈɡrɛːko]) is a common Italian surname, ranking 10th among the most widespread surnames in Italy, and it literally means "Greek". Historically, its popularity is due to the frequent relationships between Italy and Greece.

Variants of the surname include Del Greco, Della Greca, Greci, Grego, Grieco, La Greca, Lagreca, Lo Greco, Logreco, Logrieco, Greca, Grech, Grecco, etc.

== Geographical distribution ==
As of 2014, 62.6% of all known bearers of the surname Greco were residents of Italy (frequency 1:715), 17.7% of the United States (1:14,906), 6.1% of Argentina (1:5,090), 4.2% of Brazil (1:35,328), 2.4% of Canada (1:11,050) and 2.0% of France (1:24,844).

In Italy, the frequency of the surname was higher than the national average (1:715) in the following regions:

1. Calabria (1:155)
2. Apulia (1:198)
3. Sicily (1:282)
4. Molise (1:377)

In Argentina, the frequency of the surname was higher than the national average (1:5,090) in the following provinces:

1. Buenos Aires (1:2,234)
2. Tierra del Fuego Province (1:2,603)
3. Buenos Aires Province (1:3,163)
4. Santa Fe Province (1:4,827)

== List of persons with the surname ==
- Alberto Greco (1931–1965), Argentine conceptual artist
- Anthony Greco (born 1993), American ice hockey player
- Antonio Greco, Bolivian footballer
- Buddy Greco (1926–2017), American singer and pianist
- Charles Pasquale Greco (1894–1987), American prelate of the Roman Catholic Church
- Charles R. Greco (1873–1963), American architect
- Christian Greco (born 1975), Italian Egyptologist
- Cosetta Greco (1930–2002), Italian film actress
- Daniel Greco (born 1979), Swiss footballer
- Daniele Greco (born 1989), Italian triple jump athlete
- Daniele Greco (footballer) (born 1988), Italian footballer
- Demetrio Greco (born 1979), Italian footballer
- Dick A. Greco (born 1933), American politician
- Don Greco (born 1959), American football player
- Edgar Pérez Greco (born 1982), Venezuelan footballer
- Emidio Greco (1938–2012), Italian film director
- Emilio Greco (1913–1995), Italian sculptor
- Emma Greco (born 1995), Canadian ice hockey player
- Eric Greco (born 1975), American bridge player
- Francesco Greco (1942–2018), Italian lawyer and politician
- Francesco Maria Greco (1857–1931), Italian Roman Catholic priest
- Gaetano Greco (c. 1657 – c. 1728), Italian Baroque composer
- Gennaro Greco (1663–1714), Italian vedute painter
- Gerardo Greco (born 1966), Italian journalist
- Gioachino Greco (c. 1600 – c. 1634), Italian chess player and writer
- Giovanni Greco (born 1990), Italian badminton player
- Giuseppe Greco (1952–1985), Italian member of the Sicilian Mafia
- Giuseppe Greco (footballer, born 1958), Italian footballer
- Giuseppe Greco (footballer, born 1983), Italian footballer
- Jacquie Greco (born 1991), American ice hockey player
- James J. Greco (born 1958), American businessman and entrepreneur
- Jessica Greco (born 1980), Canadian comedian
- Jim Greco (born 1977), American skateboarder
- Joey Greco (born 1972), American television producer
- John Greco (born 1985), American football player
- John Greco (philosopher) (born 1961), American philosopher
- Johnny Greco (1923–1954), Canadian boxer
- José Greco (1918–2000), American flamenco dancer and choreographer
- José Vicente Grecco (1929–2008), Argentine football player and manager
- Joseph Greco (born 1972), American writer
- Joseph A. Greco (1919–2006), American politician
- Juliette Gréco (1927–2020), French chanson singer and actress
- Leandro Greco (born 1986), Italian footballer
- Leo Greco (1921–2011), radio personality
- Marco Greco (born 1963), Brazilian motorcycle racer
- Marco Greco (actor), American actor
- Maria Greco (born 1964), Italian electrical engineer
- Mario Greco (born 1959), Italian businessman
- Michael Greco (disambiguation), several persons
  - Michael Greco (actor) (born 1970), British actor and poker player
  - Michael Greco (police officer), United States Marshal for the Southern District of New York
  - Michael S. Greco (born 1942), former president of the American Bar Association
- Michele Greco (1924–2008), Italian member of the Sicilian Mafia
- Nicolás Del Grecco (born 1993), Argentine footballer
- Orazio Greco, Italian Roman Catholic prelate
- Paige Greco (1997–2025), Australian Paralympic cyclist
- Paul Greco (1955–2008), American actor
- Perlita Greco (1906–2001), Argentine-American actress
- Peter Greco (born 1946), Canadian soccer player
- Phil Greco (born 1948), American football coach
- Ralph S. Greco (1942–2019), American surgeon
- Renato Greco (born 1969), Italian footballer
- Richard Greco Jr., American politician
- Roberto Greco, Italian artist
- Rosemarie Greco, banker
- Salvatore Greco (disambiguation), several persons
  - Salvatore Greco (violinist) (born 1964), Italian violinist
  - Salvatore "Ciaschiteddu" Greco (1923–1978), Sicilian Mafia boss
  - Salvatore "The Engineer" Greco (1924–?), Sicilian Mafia boss
  - Salvatore "The Senator" Greco (1927–1999), member of the Greco Mafia clan
  - Salvatore Greco (actor), featured on the German TV series Alles was zählt
  - Salvatore Greco (politician), leader of the Italian political party Apulia First of All
- Sam Greco (born 1967), Australian full contact karateka
- Sebastiano Greco (born 1953), Italian volleyball player
- Stephen R. Greco (1919–2000), American politician
- Suzanne Greco (born 1957/58), American businesswoman of the Subway fast food chain
- Thomas H. Greco Jr. (born 1936), economist
- Vicente Greco (1888–1924), Argentine composer

== See also ==
- Greco
- Grego
