= Ayana Jordan =

American addiction psychiatrist

Ayana M. Jordan
- Born: Ayana Martina Jordan; Pittsburgh, Pennsylvania
- Education: Albert Einstein College of Medicine (PhD, MD, MS); Hampton University (BS)
- Scientific career
- Fields: Addiction psychiatry, immunopathology
- Workplaces: NYU Langone Health; Yale School of Medicine; Yale University

Ayana Jordan is an American addiction psychiatrist and immunopathologist. She researches treatments for substance use disorders in marginalized communities. She is the Barbara Wilson Associate Professor of Psychiatry at NYU Langone Health and was a professor at Yale School of Medicine. She served as an attending psychiatrist in the Yale University Department of Psychiatry. She was elected to the Board of Trustees of the American Psychiatric Association in 2018. She attended Hampton University and received her MD and PhD from the Albert Einstein College of Medicine.

== Early life and education ==
Ayana Jordan was born in Pittsburgh, Pennsylvania, and grew up in Pittsburgh's Hill District. Her family moved to a white neighbourhood when she was 12. She won the Pennsylvania Junior Academy of Science multiple times.

Jordan attended Hampton University, a historically Black university, graduating with a BS in biology in 2001. She earned her MS in pathology from the Albert Einstein College of Medicine of Yeshiva University in 2006. She received her PhD in immunopathology in 2009 and her MD in 2011, both from the Albert Einstein College of Medicine. She was a member of the Delta Sigma Theta sorority and served as president of the Einstein chapter of the Physicians for a National Health Program.

== Medical career ==
In 2011, Jordan joined the faculty of Yale School of Medicine as an assistant professor and addiction psychiatrist. During her residency, she established an internship program for students from Common Ground High School in New Haven. She became the chief resident in psychiatry in 2014. At Yale School of Medicine, Jordan served as the director of Social Justice and Health Equity curriculum for the department of psychiatry. For a time she was the faculty's sole Black woman psychiatrist.

She is double board certified, as well as a psychiatry professor at NYU. She runs the Jordan Wellness Collaborate Research Lab, which helps get access to Black and Latine people who use drugs.

In 2016, Jordan was honored as a fellow and became an attending psychiatrist at the Yale University Department of Psychiatry. In 2017, she joined the Yale University Department of Psychiatry as the director of their Social Justice and Health Equity Curriculum. She was hired by the Connecticut Mental Health Center as director of their Medication for Addiction Treatment Consultation Center in 2018. She became the Associate Psychiatry Residency Program Director at Yale in 2020. Jordan was hired as the Barbara Wilson Associate Professor of Psychiatry at NYU Langone Health in 2021.

== Research and projects ==
Jordan specializes in addiction, global mental health, and mental health in marginalized communities. Her research centers on treatment for substance use disorders, especially in underserved communities.

In 2017, Jordan joined Yale School of Medicine psychiatry professor Chyrell Bellamy to design the Imani Breakthrough Project. The project collaborated with Latino and Black churches in Connecticut as venues for the treatment of substance abuse. The program included 12 weeks of classes and wellness coaching for its participants. Patients were connected with providers of medication-assisted treatment prescriptions.

In 2018, Jordan published a study with Keturah James demonstrating that the frequency of deaths from opioids was increasing with white people less than it was with Black people. She received her first NIH R01 grant in 2020.

In 2020, Jordan worked with U.S. Representative Rosa DeLauro to secure funding for a program addressing racial disparities in the treatment of drug and alcohol addiction. The program, "Computer Based Training for Cognitive Behavioral Therapy", targeted the Black community in New Haven, Connecticut, and was hosted by the Dixwell Avenue Congregational United Church of Christ. Jordan provides treatment for methadone users in Connecticut and studied rule changes allowing methadone users to administer the medication at home during the COVID-19 pandemic.

Jordan was a senior author of a 2021 study published in Lancet Psychiatry that found that minority patients suffering from depression or anxiety had unmet needs for healthcare practitioners who were culturally competent.

Jordan was part of a team of researchers who conducted analyses of data collected on overdoses in California during the COVID-19 pandemic. She was a lead author in a 2022 study published in JAMA Psychiatry examining racial disparities in the impact of the pandemic. Jordan's research group also conducts studies of drug use and holds training sessions for the use of naloxone.

== Science communication and advocacy ==
Jordan has studied mental health in Sierra Leone. In a 2015 deportation trial for a former child soldier from the country, she told the judge that returning him to Sierra Leone would likely result in him being stigmatized and suffering a psychotic episode. She has also participated in faith-based summits on mental health.

As a science communicator, Jordan has written articles and provided commentary on subjects relating to mental health and addiction. Topics she has addressed include fentanyl, cannabis use disorder, treatments for methamphetamine users, Narcan use, the portrayal of addiction in the television series Euphoria, the link between suicide and substance abuse disorders, follow-up care for patients who screen positive for depression, excited delirium, the viability of SPECT scans for assessing alcohol-related brain damage, and racial disparities in the prescription of addiction treatments and overdose deaths. As part of the #ShareTheMic campaign in 2020, Jordan took over the Twitter account of bariatric surgeon Arghavan Salles.

In 2020, Jordan reviewed an analysis of racial disparities in prescription drug use published in JAMA Psychiatry for The New York Times. She cited corporate marketing strategies and physician bias as factors that contribute to attributed racial disparities in the duration of treatment for buprenorphine.

In 2024, her advocacy work became more prominent as she voiced the importance of White psychiatrists in being more mindful of how to treat their black patients, due to the history of racism and the trauma which ensues.

== Awards and honors ==
Jordan was elected to the Board of Trustees of the American Psychiatric Association as its Early Career Psychiatrist Trustee-at-Large in 2018. She received the Yale School of Medicine's Psychiatry Residents' Association Faculty Diversity Award in 2021. In 2025 Jordan was recognized by President Joe Biden under the White House Office of Science and Technology Policy, for her dedicated research and leadership in her field and received the Presidential Early Career Award for Scientists and Engineers (PECASE).

== Personal life ==
Jordan is Christian. During the COVID-19 pandemic, she hosted virtual Black Trivia Nights with music from live DJs.

== Selected publications ==
- Jordan, Ayana; Mathis, Myra L.; Isom, Jessica (September 2020). "Achieving Mental Health Equity: Addictions". Psychiatric Clinics of North America. 43 (3): 487–500. doi:10.1016/j.psc.2020.05.007. PMID 32773076. S2CID 221098371.
- Jordan, Ayana; Shim, Ruth S.; Rodriguez, Carolyn I. (March 1, 2021). "Psychiatry Diversity Leadership in Academic Medicine: Guidelines for Success". American Journal of Psychiatry. 178 (3): 224–228. doi:10.1176/appi.ajp.2020.20091371. PMID 33641375.
- Friedman, Joseph; Beletsky, Leo; Jordan, Ayana (February 2022). "Surging Racial Disparities in the U.S. Overdose Crisis". American Journal of Psychiatry. 179 (2): 166–169. doi:10.1176/appi.ajp.2021.21040381. PMC 8820266. PMID 35105165.
- Krawczyk, Noa; Jordan, Ayana; Cerdá, Magdalena (February 13, 2023). "Optimizing Opioid Settlement Funds To Save Lives: Investing In Equitable Solutions". Health Affairs Forefront. doi:10.1377/forefront.20230210.535750.
