= Greca =

Greca may refer to:

- Greca (clothing), a clerical item of clothing
- Greca (name), an Italian given name and surname
- Greca (insignia), an item of military insignia
- Greca, another name for a Moka pot stove-top coffee maker
- Greca (politician), Brazilian
- Saint Greca, a Sardinian saint
