= Greco =

Greco may refer to:

== People ==
- Greco (surname), a list of people with this surname
- a masculine variant of Greca (given name), an Italian feminine given name
- Greco Mafia clan, one of the most influential Mafia clans in Sicily and Calabria
- Greco Belgica, Filipino politician

== Wine and grapes ==
- Greco (grape), an Italian grape variety of ancient origins
- Vino Greco, a generic term for Roman wine made from grapes of Greek origins

== Other uses ==
- Greco-Bactrian Kingdom, Hellenistic-era Greek kingdom (256–100 BCE)
- Greco (district of Milan)
- Cape Greco, a headland in the island of Cyprus
- Group of States Against Corruption, the Council of Europe's anti-corruption monitoring body
- Greco guitars, a Japanese guitar manufacturer
- Greco Pizza Restaurant, a food chain in Eastern Canada
- Greco Defence, a chess opening
- Greco (Chrono Cross), a playable character from Chrono Cross
- Greco, an abbreviation for the Greeks
- Greco, a character from the 2010 video game James Bond 007: Blood Stone
- a Greek style one-piece swimsuit

== See also ==
- El Greco (disambiguation)
- Greco Player Tracker, an advanced AI-based casino security system in Ocean's Thirteen, named for its inventor, Greco Montgomery
