= Judge Bright =

Judge Bright may refer to:

- John Bright (judge) (1884–1948), judge of the United States District Court for the Southern District of New York
- Myron H. Bright (1919–2016), judge of the United States Court of Appeals for the Eighth Circuit
