= Grego =

Grego may refer to:

- Grego (footballer) (born 1993), Spanish footballer
- Grego (surname), a surname
- Grego Anderson (born 1967), American musician
- Grego Rossello (born 1991), Argentine actor, comedian
- DJ Grego (1956–2010), Brazilian DJ and producer
- 95935 Grego, minor planet
