= Kloštar =

Kloštar may refer to:

- Kloštar, Istria County, a village near Vrsar, Croatia
- Kloštar Ivanić, a village and municipality in Zagreb County, Croatia
- Kloštar Podravski, a village and municipality in Koprivnica-Križevci County, Croatia
- Kloštar Vojakovački, a village near Križevci, Croatia

== See also ==
- Pavlin Kloštar
- Klošter
