= Francesco Attesti =

Italian pianist

- Born: 6 June 1975 (age 51); Cortona, Italy
- Instrument: Piano

Francesco Attesti (born 6 June 1975) is an Italian classical pianist.

== Biography ==
He began practicing the piano at the age of 6 and gave his first concert at 11.

In 1998, studying with Maestro Luigi Tanganelli at the Luigi Cherubini Conservatory of Florence, Francesco Attesti earned the highest grades in piano bestowed by that institution. Soon thereafter, he attended masterclasses with Jacques Rouvier (1998), Hector Moreno (1999, 2000) and Sergio Perticaroli (1996, 2000, 2003) at the Mozarteum Salzburg.

Attesti quickly established an international reputation after winning several prizes in International Competition and receiving honorary citizenship in cities such as Diamante (Argentina), McAllen, Edinburg and Levelland (USA).

He is very interested in contemporary music and he performed several works by Bruno Bettinelli, Fabio Mengozzi, Biagio Putignano and others.

Currently, Francesco Attesti performs regularly in internationally prestigious concert halls like: Philharmonia Hall of Saint Petersburg, Tchaikovsky Conservatory of Moscow, Mozarteum of Salzburg, Philharmonie Essen, International Piano Festival of Warsaw, Sarajevo Winter Festival, Cambridge University, Leicester University, Columbia University in New York, University of Denver in Colorado, and the Conservatory Giuseppe Verdi in Milan.

Since June 2019 he is Counsellor of Culture and Tourism for the city of Cortona.

== Recordings ==
- In 1998, Francesco Attesti recorded a CD with Rugginenti Editore label with contemporary works and poems by Edoardo Sanguineti.
- In 2003 for Agorà with works by Alessandro Grego;
- In 2006 for Max Research with mezzo-soprano Annika Kaschenz.
- In 2007, with organist Matteo Galli, he published with Le Voci della Città label the first recording of Verdi's Requiem for piano and organ.
- In 2008 for Drycastle he released a CD dedicated to Frédéric Chopin.
- In 2012 for Drycastle he produced a CD called Virtuoso Sentimento with works by Johann Sebastian Bach, Franz Schubert and Ludwig van Beethoven.
- In 2014, with Drycastle label, he records a CD for clarinet and piano ("'900, French Music for clarinet and piano") with clarinet player Pietro Tagliaferri.
- In 2016, with Drycastle label, he records a DVD with piano concertos KV 449 and KV 488 by Mozart.
- In 2020 for Drycastle label, together with AB&C trio he released a jazz/progressive CD dedicated to Johann Sebastian Bach.

== Prizes ==
- 1996: F.I.D.A.P.A. Valdichiana Competition - Sommerakademie Mozarteum
- 1998: National Competition "Città di Racconigi (CN)"
- 1999: National Competition "Città di Grosseto"
- 1999: National Competition "Migliori Diplomati"
- 1999: National Competition "Terme di S. Giuliano"
- 1997 - 1998: International Competition "Rovere d’Oro"
- 2003 - 2005: Ursula Ströher Stiftung of Basel (Suisse) sponsorship
- 2005: Paul Harris Fellow of Braintree Rotary Club (Massachusetts - United States)
- 2009: Paul Harris Fellow of Beverly Rotary Club (Massachusetts - United States)
- 2011: Key to the City, Levelland (Texas, USA)
- 2011: Artist Changes Lives, Edinburg (Texas, USA)
- 2011: Honorary Citizenship, Diamante, Argentina
- 2012: Paul Harris Fellow of Burlington Rotary Club (Vermont - United States)
- 2013: Key to the City, McAllen (Texas, USA)
- 2015: Key to the City, Hornell (New York, USA)
- 2018: Ars Contemporanea Prize, Castiglione del Lago (Italy)
- 2019: Cortona Città del Mondo, Cortona (Italy)
- 2022: Bulli ed Eroi Award for Musical Excellence, Montepulciano (Italy)
- 2023: Il Giovane Dardano Award for youth promotion given by Cauthamente Festival 2023, Cortona (Italy)
- 2024: Roberto Marcolongo Prize for Musical Excellence given by A.Ma.Re.C. - A.T.Ma.R. - A.L.A., Siena (Italy)
- 2024: YouRise Price for Musical Excellence Houston (TX - USA)

--
