= Grieco =

Grieco is an Italian surname. Notable people with the surname include:

- Andrea Grieco (born 1991), Italian football player
- Gaetano Grieco (born 1982), Italian footballer
- Joseph Grieco, political scientist
- Joseph V. Grieco (1915–2006), American politician
- Paul Grieco, organic chemist:
  - Grieco elimination
  - Grieco three-component condensation
- Richard Grieco (born 1965), American actor
- Rose Grieco (1915–1995), American writer
- Ruggero Grieco (1893–1955), Italian politician
- Sergio Grieco (1917–1982), Italian film director
- Vito Grieco (born 1971), Italian footballer

== See also ==
- Greco (disambiguation)
