= Grega =

Grega is a given name. Notable people with the name include:

- Grega Benedik (born 1962), Slovenian alpine skier
- Grega Bole (born 1985), Slovenian road bicycle racer
- Grega Sorčan (born 1996), Slovenian footballer
- Grega Žemlja (born 1986), Slovenian tennis player

== See also ==
- Grego (surname)
