= Begi =

Begi refers to several places in Ethiopia:

- Begi, Benishangul-Gumuz (woreda)
- Begi, Oromia (woreda)
- Begi, Ethiopia, a town

and in Croatia:

- Begi, Croatia, a village
