= Arghavan Salles =

American surgeon (born 1980)

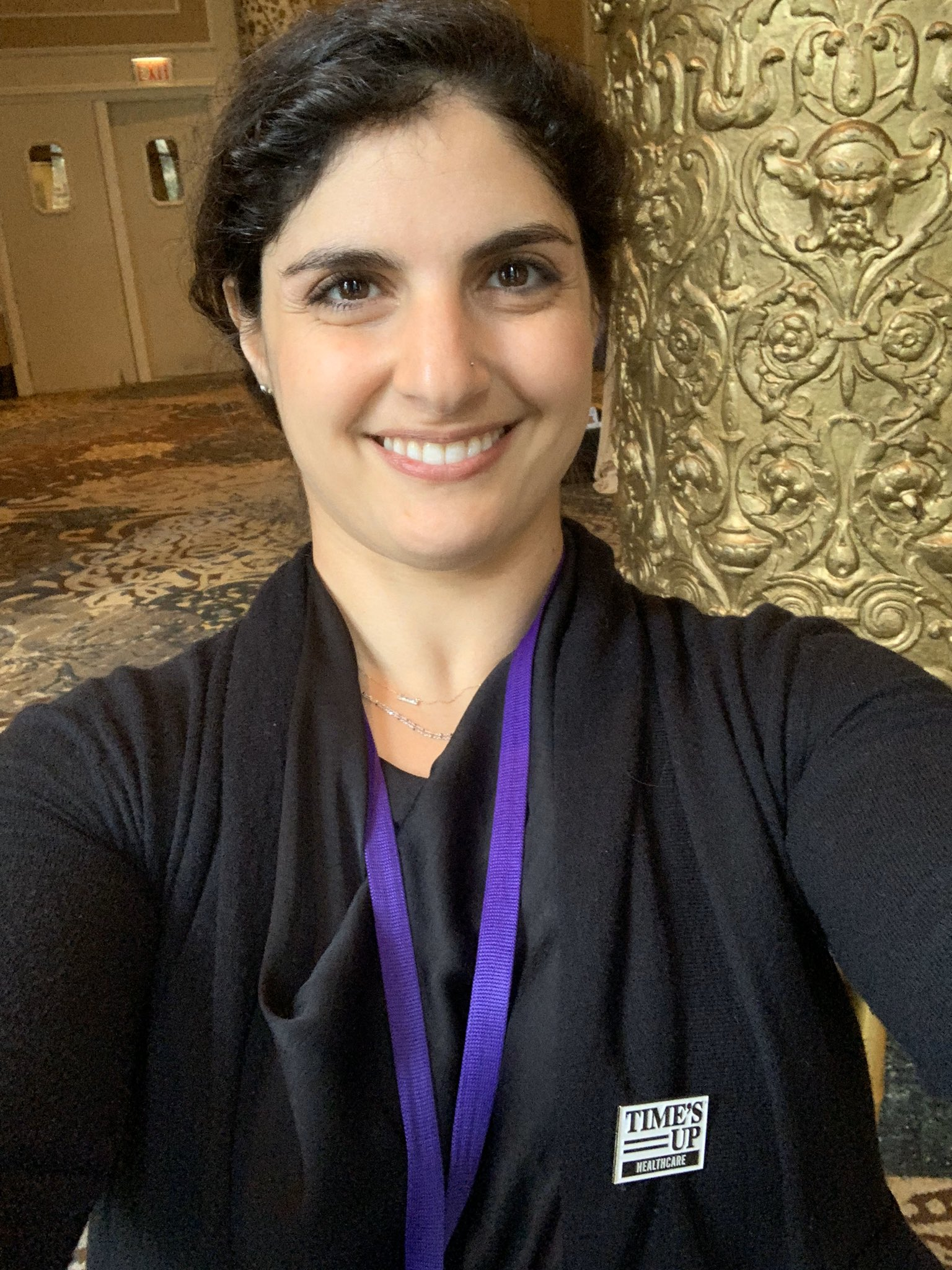
- Salles in 2020
- Born: February 23, 1980 (age 46); Iran
- Education: University of Southern California; Stanford University School of Medicine; Washington University School of Medicine; Stanford Graduate School of Education
- Known for: Advocacy for gender equity and well-being in surgery residency
- Awards: 2020 ABIM Top Research Article Award on Medical Professionalism, 2019 Exceptional Mentor Award, American Medical Women's Association, 2018 Joan F. Giambalvo Fund for the Advancement of Women
- Scientific career
- Fields: Bariatric surgery, Diversity, equity, and inclusion in medicine
- Workplaces: Stanford University School of Medicine

Arghavan Salles (Persian: ارغوان ثالث; born February 23, 1980) is an Iranian American bariatric surgeon. Salles is a Director of the American Medical Women's Association, a Special Advisor for DEI Programs in the Department of Medicine at Stanford University School of Medicine and a Senior Research Scholar at the Clayman Institute for Gender Research. Salles' research focuses on gender equity, well-being, and the challenges women face in the workplace. Salles works as an advocate for equity and inclusion and as an activist against sexual harassment. Salles is an international speaker who worked on the front lines and supported health professionals during the COVID-19 pandemic through social media.

== Early life and education ==
Salles was born in Iran and emigrated to the United States with her mother when she was five years old. While in high school Salles loved math.

In 2002, Salles received a B.S. in Biomedical Engineering and a B.A. in French from the University of Southern California. In 2006, Salles received an M.D. from Stanford University School of Medicine. Salles did a residency in general surgery from Stanford University School of Medicine from 2006 to 2015. In 2014, Salles completed a PhD social psychology from Stanford University, after which she finished her last two years of surgical residency, going on to become a Board Certified Surgeon in 2016. After finishing her residency and PhD in 2016, Salles then completed a year-long fellowship training in minimally invasive surgery at Washington University School of Medicine in St. Louis.

While Salles was Chief Resident of General Surgery at Stanford, a graduate of the surgery program took his life just six months after graduating. Salles has said that this event dramatically impacted the program to enact changes and educate the community about burnout, depression, and wellbeing in medicine. In 2011, she and a professor of surgery at Stanford at the time, Ralph Greco, created a "Balance in Life" program for surgery residents. This program included weekly psychotherapy session, mentor-mentee pairing between senior and junior residents, and support for residents in their search to find their own doctors and dentists for medical needs. The Accreditation Council for Graduate Medical Education (ACGME) has since tried to model a nationwide wellness program after the Stanford program.

In addition to issues of mental health burden due to burnout, Salles also began to see evidence of inequities, bias, and gender harassment in medicine, specifically in surgery, so she took a break from her residency to pursue a PhD in education.

== Career ==
From September 2016 to June 2019, Salles was an assistant professor in the Department of Surgery at Washington University, where her lab conducted research on gender bias and inequities in medicine. In 2017, she developed an online wellness resource for Washington University residents that offered counselling and crisis lines.

In 2018, Salles became a founding member of Time's Up Healthcare, part of the organization's initiative which supports "safe, fair, and dignified" work for women around the world and helps to prevent sexual assault and gender-based discrimination in the workplace. This same year, she and five other female medical trainees at Washington University, helped start 500 Women in Medicine, a satellite of 500 Women Scientists established to make medicine more inclusive and reflect the true diversity of society.

In 2019, Salles became a Board Certified Physician of Obesity Medicine, and returned to Stanford to develop Educational Programs and Services at the medical school. Her research focused on the representation of women at surgical conferences, implicit and explicit gender bias in healthcare and in performance evaluations, and how to maintain the health and wellbeing of physicians and medical trainees. She has also advocated against weight bias, and spoken publicly about the challenges faced by female doctors who want to have children.

During the COVID-19 pandemic, Salles created fitness challenges, free weekly yoga classes, and daily videos on Twitter and Instagram to engage her followers and bring together a supportive community. She also shared challenges women in medical fields face in getting personal protective equipment in sizes appropriate for a wide range of body sizes, and issues associated with the requirements for in-persons admissions testing during the pandemic. In 2022 Salles expressed her concern that the United States has moved on from COVID too rapidly, and people are still at risk if they contract COVID.

In 2022, Salles was selected as a Director on the Board of Directors for the American Medical Women's Association, a nationally recognized organization, founded in 1915 that is committed to the advancement of women in medicine.

== Research ==
=== Stereotype threat ===
During her PhD, Salles learned about stereotype threat. Salles began to realize the ways in which stereotype threat might be affecting her and her female peers in their evaluations during her surgery residency. Salles' dissertation research focused on the negative stereotypes about women in surgery and how those affect women training to become surgeons.

Due to strongly ingrained gender biases in society, both patients and medical peers hold strong misconceptions that women are not as competent surgeons as men. This is exemplified by the old "surgeon riddle" which unveils strong gender stereotypes in medicine such that the majority of the population much more easily associate surgeons with being male than being female. These stereotypes that society holds, about women being less competent surgeons than men, leads to a phenomenon called stereotype threat which Salles explored in her work. Salles hypothesized that stereotype threat, the fear of affirming a negative stereotype about one's group, causes women increased stress and leads to decreased performance in surgical residency. Salles tested this hypothesis by implementing methods to combat stress and stereotype threat through value affirmations.

Salles saw increases in the performance of female surgeons who had done value affirmation exercises compared to those who had not, suggesting that low-cost interventions targeted towards social-psychological well-being can improve female residents' performance. Salles later also showed that women surgeons who have higher stereotype perception have worse psychological health.

=== Gender bias in surgery ===
At Washington University, Salles explored gender bias in clinical evaluations of surgical residents. Their results, published in The American Journal of Surgery in 2018, showed that evaluations display gendered differences and the overall tones of men's evaluations were more positive and included more standout words than women's. Salles and her colleagues then used the Implicit Association Test (IAT) to assess implicit biases in the medical field. They found that respondents associated men with career and surgery while they associated women with family and family medicine.

=== Well-being in surgery ===
Salles also explores different facets of how well-being impacts the retention of residents in the progression towards careers in surgery. In 2018, Salles found that feelings of social belonging were positively correlated with well-being and negatively correlated with thoughts of leaving surgery. She then explored how general self-efficacy impacted retention in surgical specialties and found that self-efficacy was a strong predictor of well-being, which prevents physician burnout and improves retention in the medical field.

== Awards and honors ==
- 2019: Women in Medicine Summit, #IStandWithHer Award Honorable Mention
- 2019: American Medical Women's Association, Exceptional Mentor Award
- 2019: Society of Asian American Surgeons, Visiting Professor
- 2020: ABIM Top Research Article Award on Medical Professionalism Estimating Implicit and Explicit Gender Bias Among Health Care Professionals and Surgeons

== Memberships ==
- 2018–present: 500 Women in Medicine, co-founder; advisor (2018-2019)
- 2018–present: Surgery for Obesity and Related Diseases, Creative Director and Associate Editor
- 2018–present: Time's Up Healthcare, Founding Member
- 2022-present: Director on Board of Directors of American Medical Women's Association

== Selected publications ==
- Salles, Arghavan; Cohen, Geoffrey L.; Mueller, Claudia M. (February 2014). "The relationship between grit and resident well-being". Association for Surgical Education. 207 (2): 251–4. doi:10.1016/j.amjsurg.2013.09.006. PMID 24238604. Wikidata ()
- Salles, Arghavan; Awad, Michael; Goldin, Laurel; Krus, Kelsey; Lee, Jin Vivian; Schwabe, Maria T.; Lai, Calvin K. (July 5, 2019). "Estimating Implicit and Explicit Gender Bias Among Health Care Professionals and Surgeons". JAMA Network Open. 2 (7): e196545. doi:10.1001/jamanetworkopen.2019.6545. PMC 12064094. PMID 31276177.
- Gerull, Katherine M.; Loe, Maren; Seiler, Kristen; McAllister, Jared; Salles, Arghavan (February 2019). "Assessing gender bias in qualitative evaluations of surgical residents". The American Journal of Surgery. 217 (2): 306–313. doi:10.1016/j.amjsurg.2018.09.029. PMC 8687875. PMID 30343879.
- Salles, Arghavan; Choo, Esther K (March 2020). "Queen Bee phenomenon: a consequence of the hive" (PDF). The Lancet. 395 (10228): 940. doi:10.1016/S0140-6736(20)30597-3. PMID 32199482.
- Lin, Dana T.; Liebert, Cara A.; Tran, Jennifer; Lau, James N.; Salles, Arghavan (August 2016). "Emotional Intelligence as a Predictor of Resident Well-Being". Journal of the American College of Surgeons. 223 (2): 352–358. doi:10.1016/j.jamcollsurg.2016.04.044. PMID 27182037.
