= Marasi =

Marasi may refer to:

- Marsiya, Urdu Shia poem
- Marasi, Croatia, a village in Istria
