= Michael Greco =

Michael Greco may refer to:

- Michael Greco (actor) (born 1970), British actor and poker player
- Michael S. Greco (born 1942), former president of the American Bar Association
- Michael Greco (police officer), United States Marshal for the Southern District of New York

== See also ==
- Michael Grecco (born 1968), American photographer
