= Jerome Frank =

American legal theorist and judge (1889–1957)

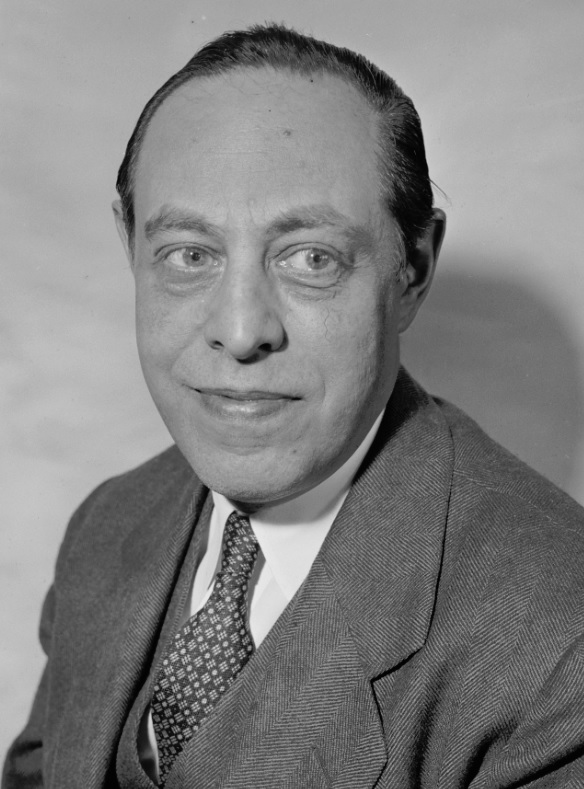
- Frank in 1939

Judge of the United States Court of Appeals for the Second Circuit
- In office March 27, 1941 – January 13, 1957
- Appointed by: Franklin D. Roosevelt
- Preceded by: Robert P. Patterson
- Succeeded by: Leonard P. Moore

Chairman of the Securities and Exchange Commission
- In office May 18, 1939 – April 9, 1941
- Preceded by: William O. Douglas
- Succeeded by: Edward C. Eicher

Personal details
- Born: Jerome New Frank; September 10, 1889 New York City, New York, U.S.
- Died: January 13, 1957 (aged 67) New Haven, Connecticut, U.S.
- Education: University of Chicago (PhB, JD)

Jerome New Frank (September 10, 1889 – January 13, 1957) was an American legal philosopher and author who played a leading role in the legal realism movement. He was chairman of the U.S. Securities and Exchange Commission, and a United States circuit judge of the United States Court of Appeals for the Second Circuit.

== Early life, education, and career ==
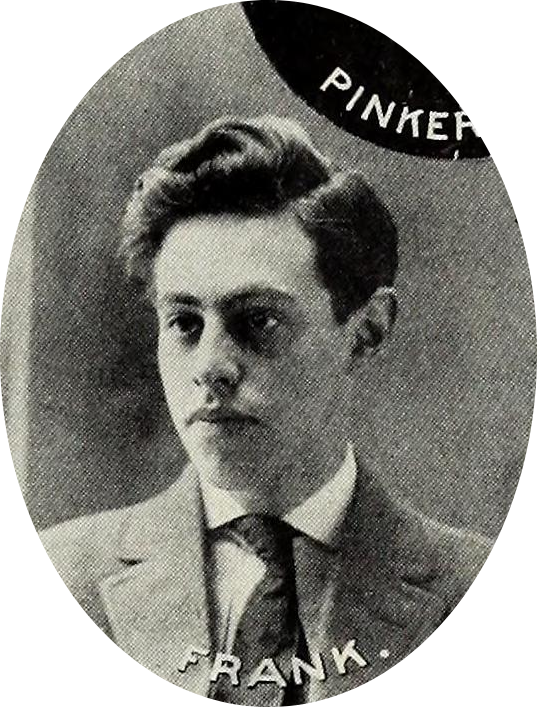
Frank in the University of Chicago yearbook, 1908

Born in New York City, New York, Frank's parents were Herman Frank and Clara New Frank, descendants of mid-19th-century German Jewish immigrants. Frank's father, also an attorney, relocated the family to Chicago, Illinois, in 1896, where Frank would attend Hyde Park High School, before receiving his Bachelor of Philosophy degree from the University of Chicago in 1909. Frank obtained his J.D. degree from the University of Chicago Law School in 1912, where he had the highest grades in the school's history, despite leaving the program for a year to work as secretary to reformist Chicago alderman Charles Edward Merriam. Frank worked as a lawyer in private practice in Chicago from 1912 to 1930, specializing in corporate reorganizations, and becoming a partner in his firm in 1919.

== Academic writing ==
Frank was a legal skeptic. He characterized cases through an equation: R x F = D, where R stands for the applicable legal rule; F signifies the facts of the case; and D signifies the decision. Frank distinguished two classes of American legal realists: rule skeptics and fact skeptics. Rule skeptics—who Frank dismissively referred to as "magic addicts"—were skeptical that the legal rules articulated in decisions could adequately explain case outcomes, but, by employing various social sciences, they believed they could discover "real rules" that could predict case outcomes. Frank, on the other hand, considered himself a "fact skeptic": While he, too, traced uncertainty in the law to indeterminate legal rules, he believed that legal uncertainty was inevitable given the impossibility of predicting judicial fact finding or fully comprehending the myriad psychological influences on a judge that might affect a decision. Moreover, Frank argued that this indefeasible uncertainty was not to be bemoaned; rather, he commented, "Much of the uncertainty of law is not an unfortunate accident: it is of immense social value."

=== Law and the Modern Mind ===
In 1930, after having undergone six months of psychoanalysis, Frank published Law and the Modern Mind, which argued against the "basic legal myth" that judges never make law but simply deduce legal conclusions from premises that are clear, certain, and substantially unchanging. Drawing on psychologists such as Sigmund Freud and Jean Piaget, Frank proposed that judicial decisions were motivated primarily by the influence of psychological factors on the individual judge. Like his judicial hero, Justice Oliver Wendell Holmes Jr., Frank urged judges and legal scholars to acknowledge openly the gaps and uncertainties in the law, and to think of law pragmatically as a tool for human betterment.

The book "dropped like a bombshell on the legal and academic world", quickly becoming "a jurisprudential bestseller" which "was widely noticed as well as criticized". In 1930, Frank moved to New York City, where he practiced until 1933, also working as a research associate at Yale Law School in 1932, where he collaborated with Karl Llewellyn of Columbia Law School, and feuded with legal idealist Roscoe Pound, dean of the Harvard Law School. In 1933, Frank published a landmark article proposing hands-on ("clinical"), not just book-based, education for law students.

In addition to the philosophical disagreements arising from Frank's realism and Pound's idealism, Pound accused Frank of misattributing quotes to him in Law and the Modern Mind, writing to Llewellyn:

I am troubled about Jerome Frank. When a man puts in quotation marks and attributes to a writer things which he not only never put in print any where, but goes contrary to what he has set in print repeatedly, it seems to me to go beyond the limits of permissible carelessness and to be incompatible, not merely with scholarship but with the ordinary fair play of controversy.

Llewellyn defended Frank, but Pound would not relent. This led Frank to produce a lengthy memorandum showing where each quote attributed to Pound by Frank could be found in Pound's writing, and offering to pay Pound to hire someone to verify the citations. Pound would continue to attack Frank's legal philosophy throughout his life, although Frank later moderated his views on legal realism.

=== Later scholarly writing ===
Frank's judicial service (1941–1957) did not stem his scholarly output. In 1942, he published If Men Were Angels, a defense of the ambitious New Deal programs, and governmental regulation in general, expressing views that he developed while serving in the SEC. In 1945, he published Fate and Freedom, which attacked the theoretical underpinnings of Marxism, denying that societies followed any strict progression and insisting that people were free to mold the development of their own society. Beginning in 1946, Frank also began teaching a regular course on legal fact-finding at Yale Law School which "emphasized the parts that human fallibility and partisanship play in the trial court processes". In 1949, he published his most significant work after Law and the Modern Mind, this being Courts on Trial, which stressed the uncertainties and fallibility of the judicial process. In 1951 he moved from New York City to New Haven, Connecticut, preferring to live closer to Yale. His last book, Not Guilty was written with his daughter, and published following his death. The book concerned specific cases of people who had been wrongfully convicted of crimes.

== Executive branch service ==
During the New Deal administration of President Franklin D. Roosevelt, Frank sought the assistance of Felix Frankfurter to secure a position with the administration. Frank was initially offered the position of solicitor of the United States Department of Agriculture, but this appointment was blocked by Postmaster General James A. Farley, who favored another candidate for the job. Frank was then appointed as general counsel of the Agricultural Adjustment Administration in 1933, and soon became embroiled in an internal struggle with the agency's head, George Peek, who had tried to exercise complete control over the agency. Peek resigned in December 1933, and Frank continued to serve until February 1935, when he was purged along with young leftist lawyers in his office. (Some of these lawyers were members of the Ware Group spy ring run by Whittaker Chambers, namely: Alger Hiss, Lee Pressman, Nathan Witt, and John Abt). Roosevelt approved the purge, but made Frank a special counsel to the Reconstruction Finance Association in 1935.

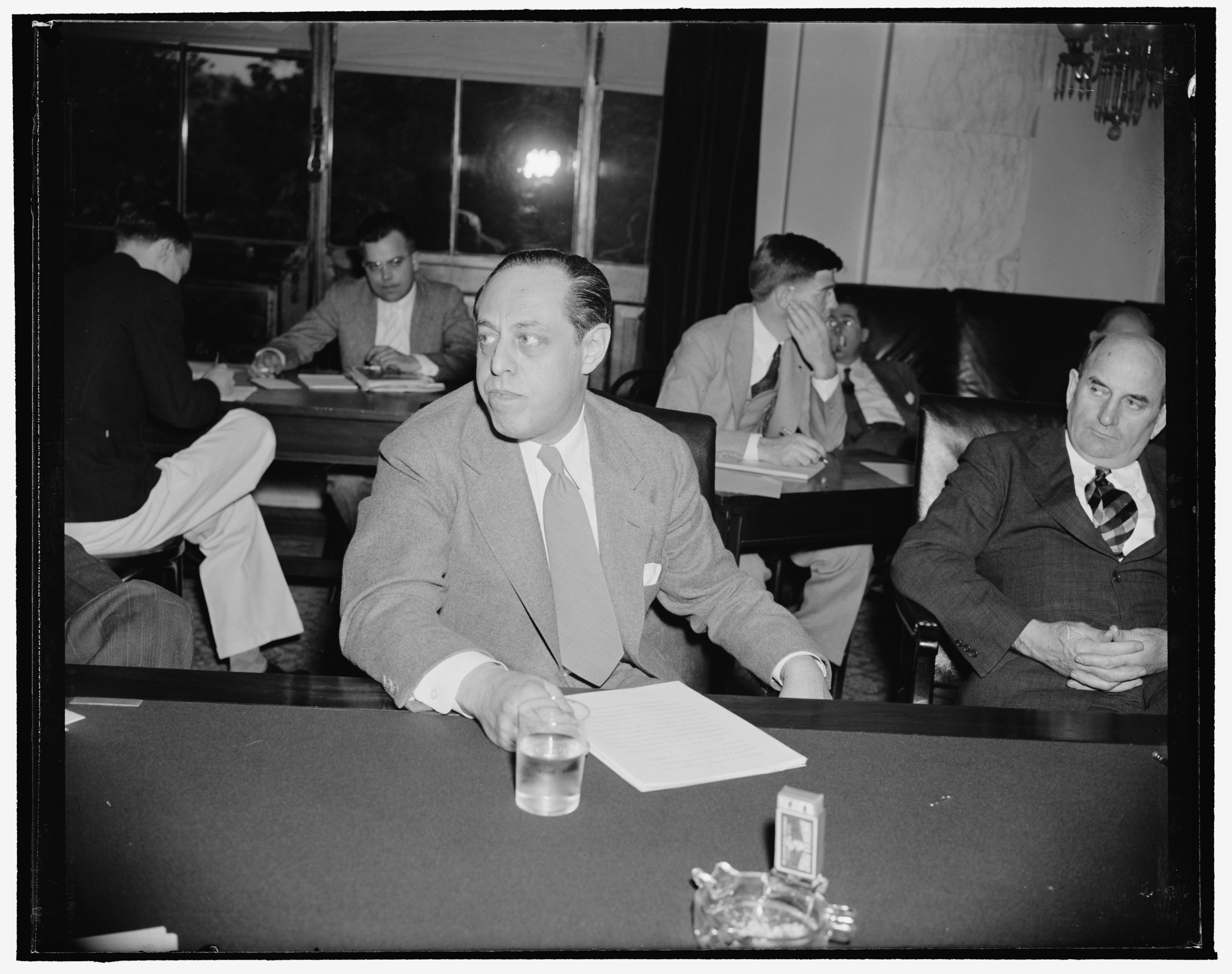
Frank making his initial appearance before a Senate Committee as S.E.C. Chairman on June 2, 1939.

Frank returned to private practice in New York from 1936 to 1938, with the firm of Greenbaum, Wolff and Ernst. In 1937, William O. Douglas recommended that Roosevelt appoint Frank to be a commissioner of the Securities and Exchange Commission, which Douglas then chaired. Roosevelt agreed, and Frank served as an SEC commissioner from December 1937 until 1941, and was elevated to Chairman from 1939 to 1941, when Douglas was appointed to the United States Supreme Court. While serving in the SEC, Frank also served on the Temporary National Economic Committee.

In 1938, Frank also published a book titled Save America First, which had been written during his return to private practice and advocating against American involvement in the stirring conflict in Europe. However, Frank recanted those views after the attack on Pearl Harbor, and Roosevelt forgave Frank's isolationism.

== Federal judicial service ==
Frank was nominated by President Franklin D. Roosevelt on February 13, 1941, to a seat on the United States Court of Appeals for the Second Circuit vacated by Judge Robert P. Patterson. He was confirmed by the United States Senate on March 20, 1941, and received his commission on March 27, 1941. His service terminated on January 13, 1957, due to his death.

=== Judicial philosophy ===
Frank was considered a highly competent judge, often taking what was perceived as the more liberal position on civil liberties issues. In addition to his reputation for expertise on civil liberties matters, he was also considered to be "an outstanding judge in the fields of procedure, finance, [and] criminal law". For a time, he was sharply and vocally at odds with a colleague on the bench, Charles Edward Clark, "over a whole range of common law precepts". In a tribute when Frank died, Clark referred to these disagreements as "glorious battles" and called Frank "a gladiator of unusual power and adroitness," who "never seemed to harbor permanent spite of any form whatsoever."

Frank's scholarly tendency bled over into his judicial opinions, some of which were notoriously lengthy. One anecdote relayed about this aspect of Frank's work tells of a law clerk who had objected to the length of one of Frank's opinions. According to the story:

He spent all of a week and finally cut it down from sixty-five pages to one-half page. He left both on Judge Frank's desk without comment. The following morning Judge Frank rushed into his clerk's office and shouted, 'Bully for you,' displaying the clerk's work, 'we'll add it to the end'.

=== Julius and Ethel Rosenberg ===
As a judge, Frank wrote the opinion in February 1952 affirming the convictions of Julius and Ethel Rosenberg, who had been convicted of conspiracy to commit espionage. In reviewing the case as part of a three-judge panel, Frank rejected each of the Rosenbergs' arguments on appeal. Frank denied that the death penalty imposed on the Rosenbergs was cruel and unusual punishment, but privately he had advised trial judge Irving Kaufman not to sentence the Rosenbergs to death. In his opinion, he also suggested that the Supreme Court might want to revisit the questions about the death penalty for crimes similar to treason.

In a related case, however, Frank dissented from his two colleagues by voting to grant a new trial to an accused third conspirator, Morton Sobell. The jury, according to Frank, should have been permitted to decide whether Sobell had joined the other conspirators in their plan to send atomic information from Los Alamos to the Soviets, or had merely engaged in a separate, less significant conspiracy with Julius Rosenberg to transmit non-atomic information.

=== United States v. Roth ===
In the 1956 case United States v. Roth, Frank wrote a concurring opinion to the decision, which affirmed the obscenity conviction of a criminal defendant. In a lengthy appendix to his concurring opinion, Frank "drew on a host of historical, literary, and social science studies to point to the dangers and contradiction of all forms of government censorship of ideas and images". The case was affirmed by the United States Supreme Court the following year, in Roth v. United States, which noted Frank's approach. The concurrence has been asserted to be one of Frank's most important opinions, and one which set the stage for the direction the Supreme Court would take on such issues beginning in the 1960s.

== Personal life and death ==
Frank married Florence Kiper on July 18, 1914, and they had their only child, daughter Barbara Frank, on April 10, 1917. Florence Frank, herself a poet and playwright, said of her husband: "Being married to Jerome is like being hitched to the tail of a comet". Frank enjoyed word games, puns, and charades.

Frank died on January 13, 1957, of a heart attack in New Haven, Connecticut.

== Legacy ==
Frank's extensive personal and judicial papers are archived at Yale University and are mostly open to researchers. Yale Law School's clinical programs are housed in the Jerome N. Frank Legal Services Organization, named in recognition of Frank's early championing of adding a clinical component to legal education.

== Works ==
Frank had published many influential books, including Law and the Modern Mind (1930), which argues for ‘legal realism’ and emphasizes the psychological forces at work in legal matters. In 1965, his daughter Barbara Frank Kristein published A Man's Reach: The Selected Writings of Judge Jerome Frank, with a foreword by William O. Douglas and an introduction by Edmond Cahn of New York University School of Law. At least one legal commentator has written that "[f]ew jurisprudential writers have aroused such prolonged public controversy as Jerome Frank".

- Law and the Modern Mind (Transaction Publishers, 1930), ISBN 1412808308, ISBN 978-1412808309.
- Save America First (New York and London: Harper & Brothers Publishers, 1938)
- If Men Were Angels (New York and London: Harper & Brothers Publishers, 1942), ISBN B007T2DFLS
- Fate and Freedom (New York: Simon & Schuster, 1945)
- Courts on Trial (Princeton, NJ: Princeton University Press, 1949), ISBN 9780691027555
- Not Guilty (Garden City, N. Y.: Doubleday & Company Inc., 1957)

== See also ==
- Legal realism
- List of Jewish American jurists

== Sources and further reading ==
- Neil Duxbury 1991: "Jerome Frank and the Legacy of Legal Realism", in Journal of Law and Society, Vol.18, No.2 (Summer 1991), pp. 175–205.
- Robert Jerome Glennon, The Iconoclast as Reformer: Jerome Frank's Impact on American Law (Cornell U. Press, 1985). 252 pp.
- Barbara Frank Kristein, A Man's Reach: The Philosophy of Judge Jerome Frank (1965).
- Julius Paul, The Legal Realism of Jerome N. Frank: A Study of Fact-Skepticism and the Judicial Process (1959).
- J. Mitchell Rosenberg, Jerome Frank: Jurist and Philosopher (1970).
- Jordan A. Schwarz, The New Dealers: Power politics in the age of Roosevelt (Vintage, 2011) pp 177–194. online
- Walter E. Volkomer, The Passionate Liberal. The Political and Legal Ideas of Jerome Frank (1970).

Government offices
Preceded by William O. Douglas	Securities and Exchange Commission Chair; 1939–1941	Succeeded by Edward C. Eicher
Legal offices
Preceded by Robert P. Patterson	Judge of the United States Court of Appeals for the Second Circuit; 1941–1957	Succeeded by Leonard P. Moore
