= El Greco Museum =

El Greco Museum may be:

- El Greco Museum, Toledo, Spain
- El Greco Museum, Fodele, Crete

== See also ==
- El Greco (disambiguation)
