= Walter R. Mansfield =

American judge (1911-1987)

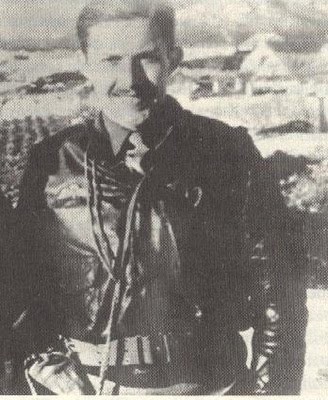
- Mansfield in 1944

Senior Judge of the United States Court of Appeals for the Second Circuit
- In office July 2, 1981 – January 8, 1987

Judge of the United States Court of Appeals for the Second Circuit
- In office May 20, 1971 – July 2, 1981
- Appointed by: Richard Nixon
- Preceded by: Leonard P. Moore
- Succeeded by: Ralph K. Winter Jr.

Judge of the United States District Court for the Southern District of New York
- In office June 29, 1966 – June 8, 1971
- Appointed by: Lyndon B. Johnson
- Preceded by: John M. Cashin
- Succeeded by: Whitman Knapp

Personal details
- Born: Walter Roe Mansfield; July 1, 1911 Boston, Massachusetts, U.S.
- Died: January 8, 1987 (aged 75) Christchurch, New Zealand
- Party: Democratic
- Education: Harvard University (BA, LLB)

Walter Roe Mansfield (July 1, 1911 – January 8, 1987) was a United States circuit judge of the United States Court of Appeals for the Second Circuit and previously was a United States District Judge of the United States District Court for the Southern District of New York.

== Education and career ==
Mansfield was born on July 1, 1911, in Boston, Massachusetts, the son of Boston Mayor Frederick W. Mansfield and Helen Elizabeth (Roe) Mansfield. He received an Artium Baccalaureus degree from Harvard University in 1932. He received a Bachelor of Laws from Harvard Law School in 1935. He was in private practice of law in New York City, New York from 1935 to 1939, from 1941 to 1942, and from 1946 to 1966. Mansfield was the first American officer who was in headquarter of Chetnik leader Draža Mihailović.

He was an Assistant United States Attorney of the Southern District of New York from 1939 to 1941. He was in the United States Marine Corps from 1942 to 1946.

== Federal judicial service ==
Mansfield was nominated by President Lyndon B. Johnson on June 13, 1966, to a seat on the United States District Court for the Southern District of New York vacated by Judge John M. Cashin. He was confirmed by the United States Senate on June 29, 1966, and received his commission the same day. His service was terminated on June 8, 1971, due to his elevation to the Second Circuit.

Mansfield was nominated by President Richard Nixon on April 26, 1971, to a seat on the United States Court of Appeals for the Second Circuit vacated by Judge Leonard P. Moore. He was confirmed by the Senate on May 20, 1971, and received his commission the same day. He assumed senior status on July 2, 1981. His service was terminated on January 8, 1987, due to his death from a stroke while on vacation in Christchurch, New Zealand.

Legal offices
Preceded by John M. Cashin	Judge of the United States District Court for the Southern District of New York; 1966–1971	Succeeded by Whitman Knapp
Preceded by Leonard P. Moore	Judge of the United States Court of Appeals for the Second Circuit; 1971–1981	Succeeded by Ralph K. Winter Jr.
