= Leonard P. Moore =

American judge (1898-1982)

Leonard Page Moore

Senior Judge of the United States Court of Appeals for the Second Circuit
- In office March 1, 1971 – December 7, 1982

Judge of the United States Court of Appeals for the Second Circuit
- In office September 6, 1957 – March 1, 1971
- Appointed by: Dwight D. Eisenhower
- Preceded by: Jerome Frank
- Succeeded by: Walter R. Mansfield

Personal details
- Born: Leonard Page Moore; July 2, 1898 Evanston, Illinois, U.S.
- Died: December 7, 1982 (aged 84) Mystic, Connecticut, U.S.
- Education: Amherst College (AB); Columbia University (LLB)

Leonard Page Moore (July 2, 1898 – December 7, 1982) was a United States circuit judge of the United States Court of Appeals for the Second Circuit.

== Early life and career ==
Born in Evanston, Illinois, Moore was in the United States Naval Reserve from 1918 to 1919, and then received an Artium Baccalaureus from Amherst College in 1919 and a Bachelor of Laws from Columbia Law School in 1922. He entered private practice in New York City, New York from 1922 to 1953. From 1953 to 1957, Moore was United States Attorney for the Eastern District of New York.

== Federal judicial service ==
On September 6, 1957, Moore received a recess appointment from President Dwight D. Eisenhower to a seat on the United States Court of Appeals for the Second Circuit vacated by the death of Judge Jerome Frank. Formally nominated by President Eisenhower to the same seat on January 13, 1958, Moore was confirmed by the United States Senate on February 25, 1958, and received his commission on February 27, 1958. He assumed senior status on March 1, 1971, serving in that capacity until his death on December 7, 1982, in Mystic, Connecticut.

=== Clerk ===
Michael S. Greco, former president of the American Bar Association, clerked for Moore.

== Sources ==
Legal offices
Preceded by Jerome Frank	Judge of the United States Court of Appeals for the Second Circuit; 1958–1971	Succeeded by Walter R. Mansfield
