= Greca (name) =

Greca is a surname of Italian origin, denoting someone of Greek descent.

It may also be a female given name in Italian, also known in its feminine variant of Grecia and its male variant of Greco. All three words derive from the Latin 'Graeca' or 'Graecus', which operated as an ethnonym for someone of Greek ethnicity, or a demonym for someone born in Greece. During the medieval era this was expanded to citizens of the Byzantine Empire. Semantically it is similar to the given name Elladio. In the modern era it is most commonly used in Sardinia, and more specifically in the Sardinian province of Cagliari due to its cult of Saint Greca. It is also used in Tuscany and Emilia-Romagna.

== Notable people ==
=== Surname ===
- Bedri Greca (born 1990), Albanian footballer
- Rafael Greca (born 1956), Brazilian engineer and politician

=== Given name ===
- Saint Greca (284–304), Christian saint
