= Law and the Modern Mind =

Book

- Title page for Law and the Modern Mind (1949 edition)
- Author: Jerome Frank
- Publication date: 1930

Law and the Modern Mind is a 1930 book by Jerome Frank which argued that judicial decisions were more influenced by psychological factors than by objective legal premises.

Frank, then a legal academic, published the book after having undergone six months of psychoanalysis. In it, he argued against the "basic legal myth" that judges never make law but simply deduce legal conclusions from premises that are clear, certain, and substantially unchanging. Drawing on psychologists such as Sigmund Freud and Jean Piaget, Frank proposed that judicial decisions were motivated primarily by the influence of psychological factors on the individual judge. Like his judicial hero, Justice Oliver Wendell Holmes Jr., Frank urged judges and legal scholars to acknowledge openly the gaps and uncertainties in the law, and to think of law pragmatically as a tool for human betterment. The book "dropped like a bombshell on the legal and academic world", quickly becoming "a jurisprudential bestseller" which "was widely noticed as well as criticized".
