= John M. Cashin =

American judge (1892–1970)

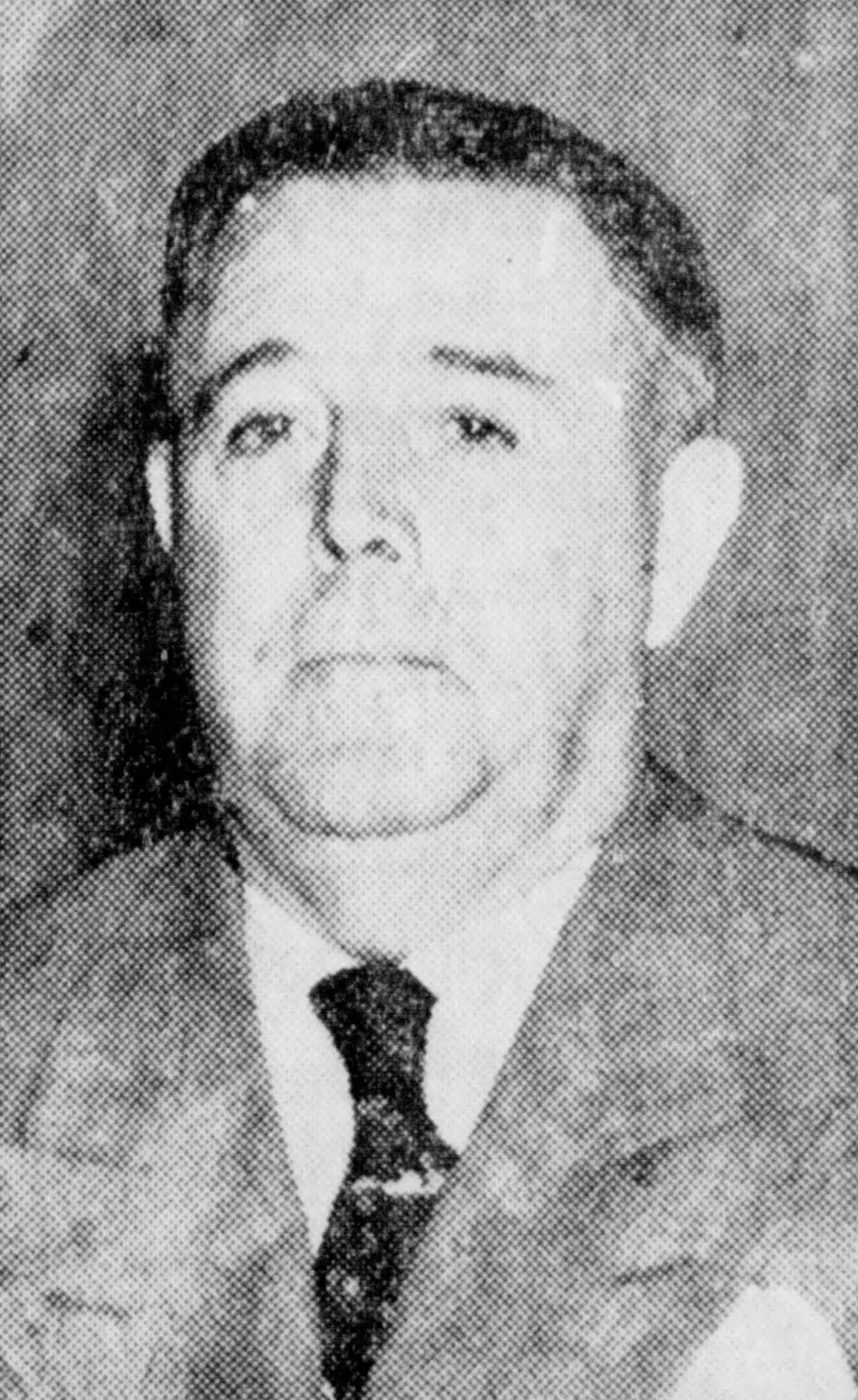

Senior Judge of the United States District Court for the Southern District of New York
- In office October 1, 1965 – October 21, 1970

Judge of the United States District Court for the Southern District of New York
- In office August 17, 1955 – October 1, 1965
- Appointed by: Dwight D. Eisenhower
- Preceded by: Samuel H. Kaufman
- Succeeded by: Walter R. Mansfield

Personal details
- Born: John Martin Cashin; August 31, 1892 Kingston, New York
- Died: October 21, 1970 (aged 78) Kingston, New York
- Education: Cornell Law School (LL.B.)

John Martin Cashin (August 31, 1892 – October 21, 1970) was a United States district judge of the United States District Court for the Southern District of New York.

== Education and career ==
Born in Kingston, New York, Cashin received a Bachelor of Laws from Cornell Law School in 1915 and was in private practice in Kingston from 1916 to 1922. He was also the city treasurer of Kingston in 1922, and was then an Assistant United States Attorney of the Southern District of New York from 1922 to 1925. He was counsel to the Federal Prohibition Administration from 1925 to 1926, returning to private practice in Kingston from 1926 to 1943. He was also corporation counsel to the City of Kingston from 1935 to 1941. He was a county judge for Ulster County, New York from 1943 to 1955.

== Federal judicial service ==
On August 17, 1955, Cashin received a recess appointment from President Dwight D. Eisenhower to a seat on the United States District Court for the Southern District of New York vacated by Judge Samuel H. Kaufman. Formally nominated to the same seat by President Eisenhower on January 12, 1956, Cashin was confirmed by the United States Senate on March 1, 1956, and received his commission the next day. He assumed senior status on October 1, 1965. Cashin served in that capacity until his death on October 21, 1970, in Kingston.

== Sources ==
Legal offices
| Preceded by Samuel H. Kaufman | Judge of the United States District Court for the Southern District of New York; 1955–1965 | Succeeded by Walter R. Mansfield |
