= Bralići =

Bralići Bralici
- Village
- Location within Croatia
- Coordinates: 45.1687384°N 13.6891156°E
- Country: Croatia
- County: Istria County
- Municipality: Vrsar

Area
  - Total: 0.31 sq mi (0.8 km^{2})

Population (2021)
  - Total: 23
  - Density: 74/sq mi (29/km^{2})
- Time zone: UTC+1 (CET)
  - Summer (DST): UTC+2 (CEST)
- Postal code: 52450 Vrsar
- Area code: 052

Bralići (Italian: Bralici) is a village in the municipality of Vrsar, in Istria, Croatia.

== Demographics ==
According to the 2021 census, its population was 23.
