= Samuel H. Kaufman =

American judge

Senior Judge of the United States District Court for the Southern District of New York
- In office July 31, 1955 – May 5, 1960

Judge of the United States District Court for the Southern District of New York
- In office June 22, 1948 – July 31, 1955
- Appointed by: Harry S. Truman
- Preceded by: John Bright
- Succeeded by: John M. Cashin

Personal details
- Born: Samuel Hamilton Kaufman; October 26, 1893 New York City, New York
- Died: May 5, 1960 (aged 66) New York City, New York
- Education: New York University School of Law (LL.B.)

Samuel Hamilton Kaufman (October 26, 1893 – May 5, 1960) was a United States district judge of the United States District Court for the Southern District of New York.

== Education and career ==
Born in New York City, New York in a Jewish family, Kaufman received a Bachelor of Laws from the New York University School of Law in 1917. He served in the United States Army during World War I. He was in private practice of law in New York City from 1918 to 1948. He was special assistant to the United States Attorney General from 1935 to 1936. He was special counsel for the Federal Communications Commission from 1937 to 1938. He was associate general counsel for the Joint Congressional Committee Investigating Pearl Harbor in 1946.

== Federal judicial service ==
Kaufman received a recess appointment from President Harry S. Truman on June 22, 1948, to a seat on the United States District Court for the Southern District of New York vacated by Judge John Bright. He was nominated to the same seat by President Truman on January 13, 1949. He was confirmed by the United States Senate on January 31, 1949, and received his commission on February 2, 1949. He assumed senior status due to a certified disability on July 31, 1955. His service was terminated on May 5, 1960, due to his death in New York City.

== See also ==
- List of Jewish American jurists

== Sources ==
Legal offices
Preceded by John Bright	Judge of the United States District Court for the Southern District of New York; 1948–1955	Succeeded by John M. Cashin
