= Elladio =

Elladio or Eladio is an Italian given name, also known in its feminine variants of Elladia or Eladia. It also appears in Latin as Helladius, in Polish as Heladiusz or Eladiusz and in Spanish as Eladio. These all derive from Ἑλλάδιος Helladios, an ethnonymic name in Greek attested since late antiquity and meaning 'one from Hellas' (i.e. from Greece; MASC). This is similar to the name "Greca" (see names of Greece and names of the Greeks).

== List of holders ==
- Eladio Vicuña Aránguiz
- Eladio Acosta Arteaga
- Eladio Campos
- Eládio Clímaco
- Eladio Rosabal Cordero
- Eladio Dieste
- Eladio Fernández Guillermo
- Eladio Herrera (boxer)
- Eladio Herrera (footballer)
- Eladio Jala
- Eladio Jiménez
- Eladio Lárez
- Eladio Loizaga
- Eladio Martínez
- Eladio Perez
- Eladio Reyes
- Eladio Rodríguez
- Eladio Sánchez
- Don Eladio Sauza
- Eladio Rojas
- Eladio Romero Santos
- Eladio Silvestre
- Eladio Torres
- Eladio Valdés
- Eladio Vallduvi
- Eladio Vaschetto
- Eladio Vélez
- Eladio Victoria
- Eladio Zárate
- San Eladio Point
