= Delići =

- Village
- Location within Croatia
- Coordinates: 45.170389°N 13.6731387°E
- Country: Croatia
- County: Istria County
- Municipality: Vrsar

Area
  - Total: 0.39 sq mi (1.0 km^{2})

Population (2021)
  - Total: 21
  - Density: 54/sq mi (21/km^{2})
- Time zone: UTC+1 (CET)
  - Summer (DST): UTC+2 (CEST)
- Postal code: 52450 Vrsar
- Area code: 052

Delići is a village in the municipality of Vrsar, in Istria, Croatia.

== Demographics ==
According to the 2021 census, its population was 21.
