= Flengi =

Flengi Prodani
- Village
- Location within Croatia
- Coordinates: 45.1577723°N 13.648346°E
- Country: Croatia
- County: Istria County
- Municipality: Vrsar

Area
  - Total: 1.5 sq mi (3.9 km^{2})

Population (2021)
  - Total: 149
  - Density: 99/sq mi (38/km^{2})
- Time zone: UTC+1 (CET)
  - Summer (DST): UTC+2 (CEST)
- Postal code: 52450 Vrsar
- Area code: 052

Flengi (Italian: Prodani) is a village in the municipality of Vrsar, in Istria, Croatia.

== Demographics ==
According to the 2021 census, its population was 149.
