= Vrsar =

Vrsar Orsera
- Municipality
- Vrsar/Orsera Municipality; Općina Vrsar - Comune di Orsera
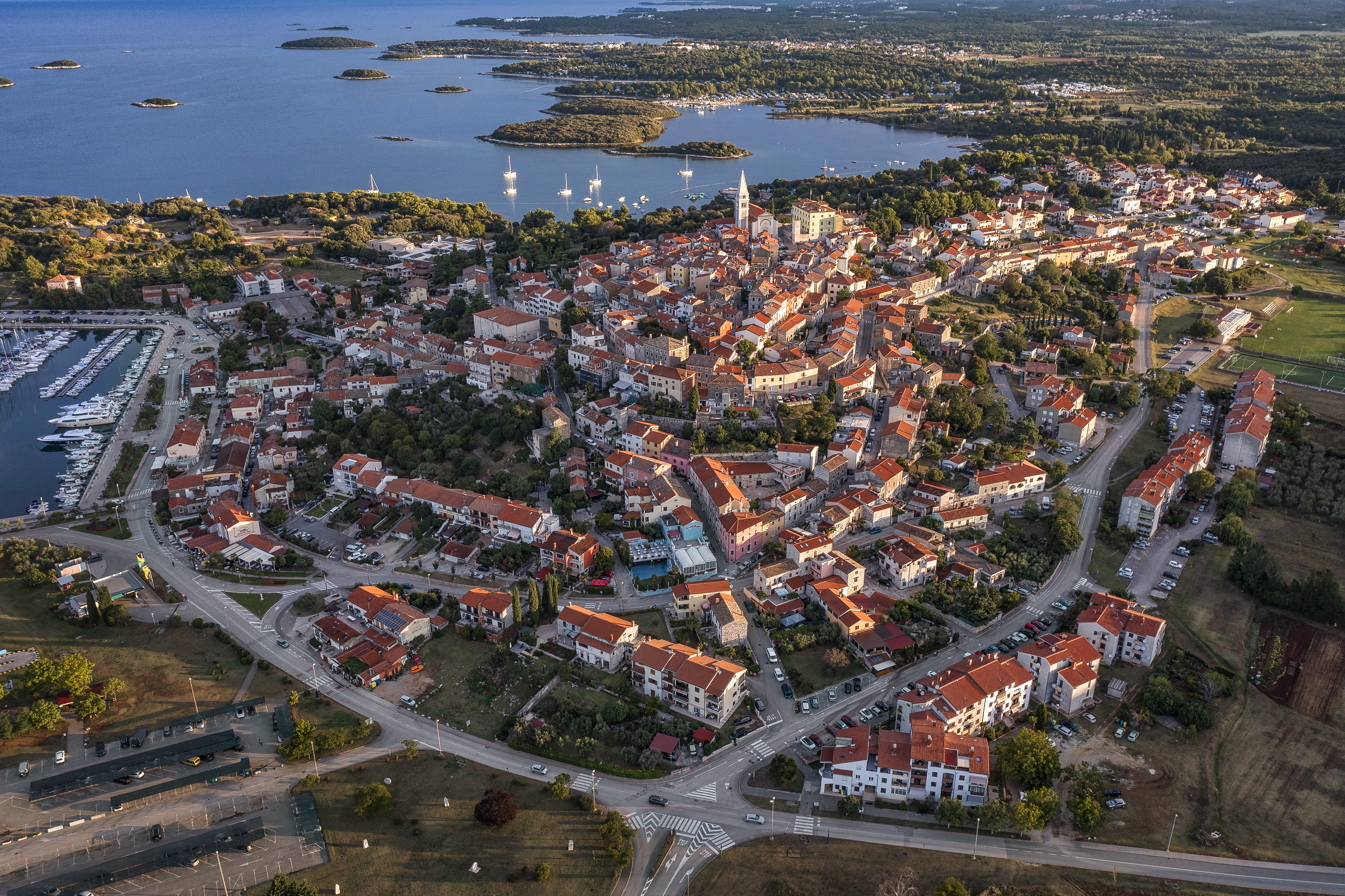
- Vrsar old harbor

- Flag

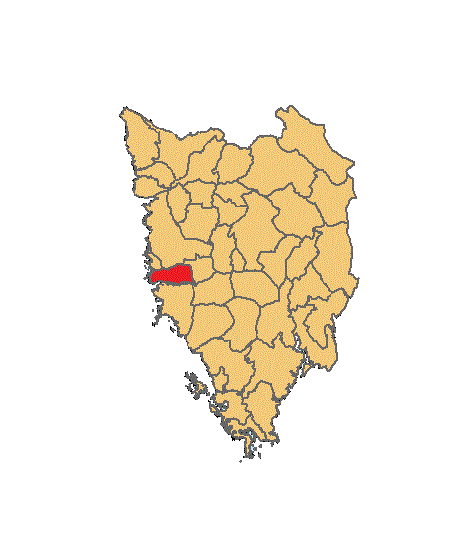
- Location of Vrsar in Istria
- Interactive map of Vrsar
- Location within Croatia
- Coordinates: 45°09′N 13°36′E
- Country: Croatia
- County: Istria County

Government
  - Mayor: Tina Slamar (HDZ)

Area
  - Municipality: 14.1 sq mi (36.5 km^{2})
  - Urban: 5.9 sq mi (15.2 km^{2})

Population (2021)
  - Municipality: 1,923
  - Density: 136/sq mi (52.7/km^{2})
  - Urban: 1,535
  - Urban density: 262/sq mi (101/km^{2})
- Time zone: UTC+1 (CET)
  - Summer (DST): UTC+2 (CEST)
- Postal code: 52440 Poreč
- Area code: 52
- Website: vrsar.hr

Vrsar (Italian and Venetian: Orsera) is a seaside village and a municipality in Istria, west Croatia, located 9 kilometers south of Poreč. The historical center is located on top of a hill, including the St. Martin parish church and the 40-meter high bell tower. In the 20th century, the town expanded down the hill, into the surrounding area. It is a popular summer destination with large campsites, private accommodation units and a modern marina. It is the home of the large Koversada Naturist Campsite, the oldest in Istria.

== Municipality ==
The municipality consists of Vrsar as the largest settlement and 8 villages in the interior, including Begi, Bralići, Delići, Flengi, Gradina, Kloštar, Kontešići and Marasi. Funtana, the nearby coastal town, was a part of the Vrsar municipality until 2006. Town council has 11 representatives elected every four years. Local government is based in a refurbished historical building in the central Degrassi Square.

== Demographics ==
According to the 2021 census, its population was 1,923. with 1,535 living in the town proper. It was 2,162 in 2011.

The municipality consists of the following settlements:

- Begi, population 31
- Bralići, population 23
- Delići, population 21
- Flengi, population 149
- Gradina, population 44
- Kloštar, population 41
- Kontešići, population 4
- Marasi, population 75
- Vrsar, population 1535
Vrsar: Population trends 1857–2021
v

population	1046	1153	1489	1917	2260	2299	2390	2578	2229	1469	1310	1575	1955	2295	2703	2162	1923
	1857	1869	1880	1890	1900	1910	1921	1931	1948	1953	1961	1971	1981	1991	2001	2011	2021

Sources: Croatian Bureau of Statistics publications

=== Language ===
Although though the Government of the Republic of Croatia does not guarantee official Croatian-Italian bilinguialism here, the statute of Vrsar itself does.

== History ==
Vrsar was part of the Republic of Venice (1420-1797), then of the French Kingdom of Italy firstly, and Illyrian Provinces till 1814. After the fall of Napoleon, it was part of the Austrian Littoral up to 1915 then became part of Kingdom of Italy (1918–1947) after which it was part of Yugoslavia until 1991 when incorporated in the Republic of Croatia.

== Naturist Park ==
Until 2025, the Koversada Naturist Park was located 2 kilometers south of Vrsar. It had over 1100 camping emplacements, 350 with their own water and 600 with internet connections. It was situated in ninety hectares of olive groves on the shore and on a tiny island. It was linked to the town by a tourist train.

In 2025 Koversada was turned into a mainly textile campsite "Koversada Covered" while a small part of the campsite is still a naturist site "Koversada uncovered".

== Notable people ==
- Francesco Carpenetti (born 1942), Italian footballer
- Lino Červar (born 1950), Croatian handball coach
- Egidio Grego (1894–1917), Italian aviator
- Antonio Quarantotto (1897–1987), Italian swimmer
