= El Greco (disambiguation) =

El Greco (1541–1614) was a Greek painter, sculptor, and architect of the Spanish Renaissance.

El Greco may also refer to:

- The artistic style (Art of El Greco) which El Greco pioneered (typically used as an adjective in quotations)
- Christos Navrozidis, Greek freestyle wrestler and bare-knuckle fighter
- El Greco (1966 film), by Luciano Salce
- El Greco (2007 film), by Yannis Smaragdis
- El Greco (album), a 1998 album by Vangelis
- El Greco (soundtrack), a 2007 album by Vangelis with the score to the film by Yannis Smaragdis
- El Greco (typeface)

== See also ==
- El Greco Museum (disambiguation)
- El Greco Apartments, Los Angeles, California, on the National Register of Historic Places
