= Immunopathology =

Branch of medicine that deals with immune responses associated with disease

Immunopathology is a branch of medicine that deals with immune responses associated with disease. It includes the study of the pathology of an organism, organ system, or disease with respect to the immune system, immunity, and immune responses. In biology, it refers to damage caused to an organism by its own immune response, as a result of an infection. It could be due to mismatch between pathogen and host species, and often occurs when an animal pathogen infects a human (e.g. avian flu leads to a cytokine storm which contributes to the increased mortality rate).

== Types of Immunity ==
In all vertebrates, there are two different kinds of immunities: Innate and Adaptive immunity. Innate immunity is used to fight off non-changing antigens and is therefore considered nonspecific. It is usually a more immediate response than the adaptive immune system, usually responding within minutes to hours. It is composed of physical blockades such as the skin, but also contains nonspecific immune cells such as dendritic cells, macrophages, and basophils. The second form of immunity is Adaptive immunity. This form of immunity requires recognition of the foreign antigen before a response is produced. Once the antigen is recognized, a specific response is produced in order to destroy the specific antigen. Because of its tailored response characteristic, adaptive immunity is considered to be specific immunity. A key part of adaptive immunity that separates it from innate is the use of memory to combat the antigen in the future. When the antigen is originally introduced, the organism does not have any receptors for the antigen so it must generate them from the first time the antigen is present. The immune system then builds a memory of that antigen, which enables it to recognize the antigen quicker in the future and be able to combat it quicker and more efficiently. The more the system is exposed to the antigen, the quicker it will build up its responsiveness. Nested within Adaptive immunity are the Primary and Secondary Immune Responses.

The Primary Immune Response refers to the first exposure and subsequent response of the immune system to a pathogen. During this initial response, the immune system identifies and targets the pathogen through various mechanisms, including the activation of immune cells such as T cells and B cells, which produce antibodies that specifically target the pathogen. The Secondary Immune Response occurs upon subsequent encounters with the same pathogen. During the Primary Immune Response, memory cells are generated that remember the specific pathogen and how to target it. When the same pathogen enters the body again, the memory cells are quickly activated, leading to a faster and more efficacious response compared to the primary immune response. This results in more effective elimination of the pathogen. Vaccines serve to activate the Primary Immune Response through exposure to weakened or less dangerous antigens, preparing the body's memory cells for the purpose of the immune system being more equipped to handle the equivalent full scale antigen.

== Improper Immune Responses ==
When a foreign antigen enters the body, there is either an antigen specific or nonspecific response to it. These responses are the immune system fighting off the foreign antigens, whether they are deadly or not. A possible definition of Immunopathology is how the foreign antigens cause the immune system to have a response or problems that can arise from an organism's own immune response on itself. There are certain problems or faults in the immune system that can lead to more serious illness or disease. These diseases can come from one of the following problems. The first would be Hypersensitivity reactions, where there would be a stronger immune response than normal. There are four different types (type one, two, three and four), all with varying types and degrees of an immune response. The problems that arise from each type vary from small allergic reactions to more serious illnesses such as tuberculosis or arthritis. The second kind of complication in the immune system is Autoimmunity, where the immune system would attack itself rather than the antigen. Inflammation is a prime example of autoimmunity, as the immune cells used are self-reactive. A few examples of autoimmune diseases are Type 1 diabetes, Addison's disease and Celiac disease. The third and final type of complication with the immune system is Immunodeficiency, where the immune system lacks the ability to fight off a certain disease. The immune system's ability to combat it is either hindered or completely absent. The two types are Primary Immunodeficiency, where the immune system is either missing a key component or does not function properly, and Secondary Immunodeficiency, where disease is obtained from an outside source, like radiation or heat, and therefore cannot function properly. Diseases that can cause immunodeficiency include HIV, AIDS and leukemia.

== Cancer ==
The immune system plays an important role in protecting the body against cancer. The immune response to cancer can be categorized into the two main categories as discussed above: innate immunity and adaptive immunity.

Innate immunity is the first line of defense against cancer. It consists of non-specific immune cells that can recognize and destroy abnormal cells, including cancer cells. Natural killer (NK) cells, dendritic cells, and macrophages are some examples of innate immune cells that can detect and eliminate cancer cells.

Adaptive immunity, on the other hand, is more specific and targeted. It involves the activation of T cells and B cells, which can recognize and attack cancer cells that have specific antigens on their surface. T cells can directly kill cancer cells or help activate other immune cells to attack cancer cells. B cells can produce antibodies that recognize and neutralize cancer cells.

However, cancer cells can evade immune surveillance and escape destruction by the immune system through various mechanisms, including downregulating antigen presentation, producing immunosuppressive molecules, and inhibiting T cell function. This can lead to the development and progression of cancer.

Immunotherapy is a type of cancer treatment that aims to harness and enhance the immune system's ability to recognize and attack cancer cells. Some examples of immunotherapies include checkpoint inhibitors, which block molecules that inhibit T cell activation, and CAR-T cell therapy, which involves modifying T cells to recognize and attack cancer cells more efficiently.
