= Leo Greco =

American radio personality

Leo Greco (1 November 1921 - 2 August 2011) was a radio personality at WMT AM and WMT-FM in Cedar Rapids, Iowa. In 2010, Greco was honored by the National Association of Broadcasters with the Marconi award for Radio Personality of the Year. He died on 2 August 2011, in Hiawatha, Iowa.

== Early life ==
Leo was born in Oelwein to Dominic Greco and Mary Napoli Greco.
