= Kloštar, Istria County =

Kloštar San Michele di Leme
- Village
- Location within Croatia
- Coordinates: 45.1436617°N 13.658027°E
- Country: Croatia
- County: Istria County
- Municipality: Vrsar

Area
  - Total: 2.3 sq mi (5.9 km^{2})

Population (2021)
  - Total: 41
  - Density: 18/sq mi (6.9/km^{2})
- Time zone: UTC+1 (CET)
  - Summer (DST): UTC+2 (CEST)
- Postal code: 52450 Vrsar
- Area code: 052

Kloštar (Italian: San Michele di Leme) is a village in the municipality of Vrsar, in Istria, Croatia. It is located on the northside of Lim Bay.

== Demographics ==
According to the 2021 census, its population was 41.
