= Grego Anderson =

American blues musician and folk artist

Grego Anderson (born 1967) is an American blues musician and folk artist, living in Austin, Texas, United States.

== Art ==
His artwork has been exhibited in galleries from Boston, Massachusetts to San Diego, California, and is featured in the Mojohand online gallery. His work is best described as "rustic;" he paints only portraits of blues musicians on wooden planks. His work appears as the cover art for blues musician Selwyn Birchwood's 2017 album, Pick Your Poison.

== Honors ==
Anderson was recognized by the United States Congress in 2003 as one of two official visual artists for the Year of the Blues.

== Appearances ==
Anderson appears in the Lightnin' Hopkins' documentary film, Where Lightnin' Strikes—the Lightnin' Hopkins story, and on the Veria television program, The Art of Living.

== Music ==
Anderson is also a blues musician, playing lap steel guitar with The Freight Train Troubadours and Los Pistoles in Austin Texas, and as a sideman throughout the Americas.

== See also ==
- Folk art
