= Salvatore Greco =

Salvatore Greco may refer to:

- Salvatore Greco (violinist) (born 1964), Italian violinist
- Salvatore "Ciaschiteddu" Greco (1923–1978), Sicilian Mafia boss
- Salvatore "The Engineer" Greco (born 1924), Sicilian Mafia boss
- Salvatore "The Senator" Greco, member of the Greco Mafia clan
- Salvatore Greco (actor), featured on the German TV series Alles was zählt
- Salvatore Greco (politician), leader of the Italian political party Apulia First of All
