= John Bright (judge) =

American judge

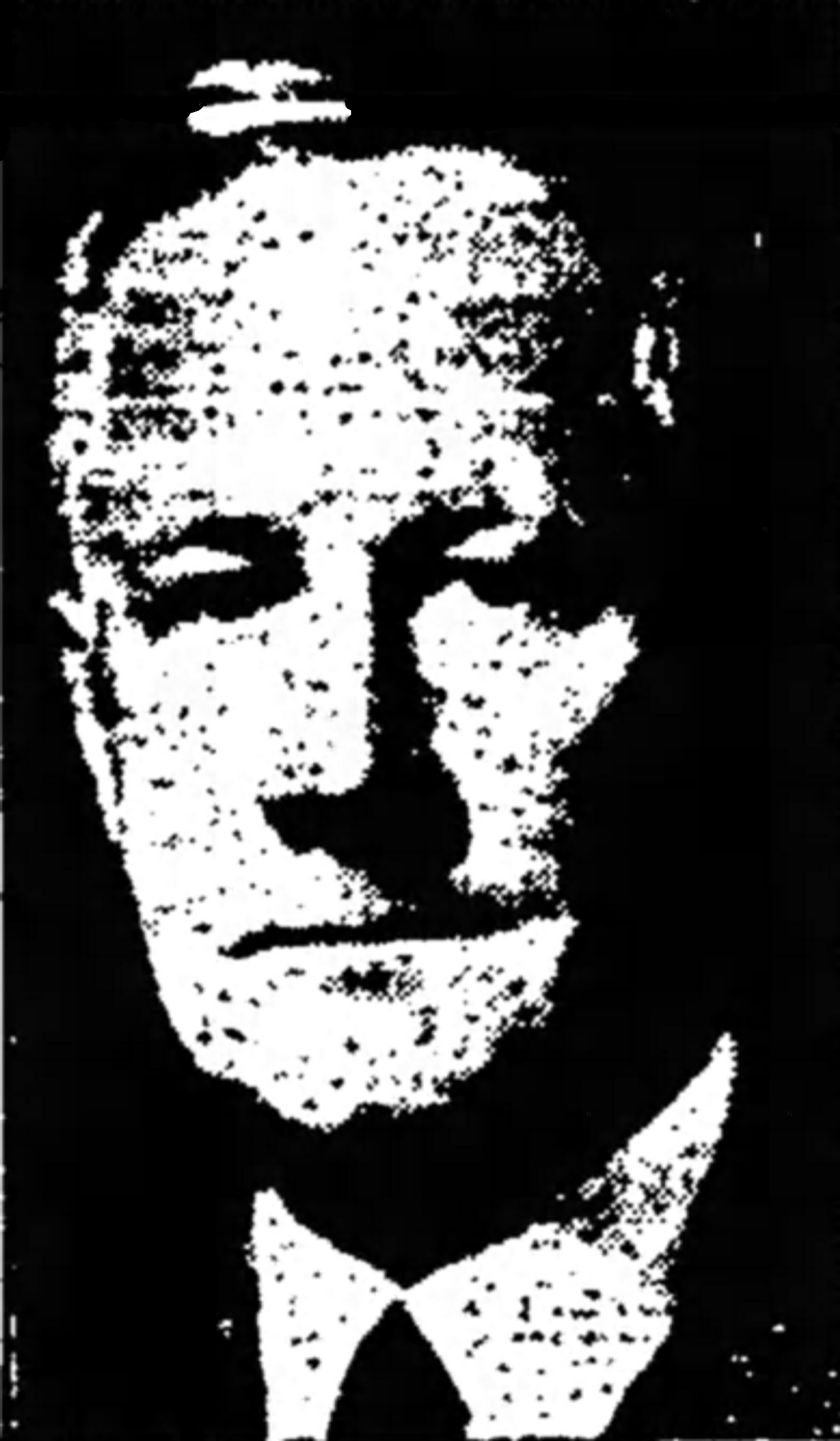

Judge of the United States District Court for the Southern District of New York
- In office June 6, 1941 – March 24, 1948
- Appointed by: Franklin D. Roosevelt
- Preceded by: Seat established by 54 Stat. 219
- Succeeded by: Samuel H. Kaufman

Personal details
- Born: John Bright; May 23, 1884 Middletown, New York
- Died: March 24, 1948 (aged 63) Middletown, New York
- Education: read law

John Bright (May 23, 1884 – March 24, 1948) was a United States district judge of the United States District Court for the Southern District of New York.

== Education and career ==
Born in Middletown, Orange County, New York, Bright read law to enter the bar in 1906. He was in private practice in Middletown from 1906 to 1941, serving as corporate counsel to the City of Middletown from 1910 to 1917, and as Director of the Orange County Trust Company in 1914.

== Federal judicial service ==
Bright was nominated by President Franklin D. Roosevelt on April 25, 1941, to the United States District Court for the Southern District of New York, to a new seat authorized by 54 Stat. 219. He was confirmed by the United States Senate on June 3, 1941, and received his commission on June 6, 1941. His service terminated on March 24, 1948, due to his death in Middletown.

== Sources ==
Legal offices
Preceded by Seat established by 54 Stat. 219	Judge of the United States District Court for the Southern District of New York; 1941–1948	Succeeded by Samuel H. Kaufman
