= Grego (surname) =

Grego is a surname. Notable people with the surname include:

- Alessandro Grego (born 1969), Italian composer
- Andrea Grego (1400–1485), Italian Dominican friar and preacher
- Antun Grego (born 1940), Croatian sailor
- Bojan Grego (born 1970), Croatian sailor
- Egidio Grego (1894–1917), Italian aviator
- Jim Grego (born 1955), American politician
- João Grego, 15th century Portuguese explorer
- Joseph Grego (1843–1908), English art collector
- Laura Grego, American physicist
- Melania Grego (born 1973), Italian water polo player
