= Surgery for Obesity and Related Diseases =

- Subject: Bariatric surgery
- Language: English
- Edited by: Harvey Sugerman, Raul J. Rosenthal

Publication details
- History: 2005–present
- Publisher: Elsevier
- Frequency: Bimonthly
- Impact factor: 3.5 (2023)

Standard abbreviations
- ISO 4: Surg. Obes. Relat. Dis.

Indexing
- ISSN: 1550-7289 (print); 1878-7533 (web)
- OCLC no.: 723554412

Links
- Journal homepage; Online access; Online archive

Surgery for Obesity and Related Diseases is a bimonthly peer-reviewed medical journal covering the use of surgery to treat obesity and related medical conditions. It was established in 2005 and is published by Elsevier. It is the official journal of the American Society for Metabolic and Bariatric Surgery, the Brazilian Society for Bariatric Surgery, and the Asociacion Latinoamericana de Cirujanos Endoscopistas. The editors-in-chief are Harvey Sugerman and Raul J. Rosenthal. According to the Journal Citation Reports, the journal has a 2023 impact factor of 3.5.
