= Egidio Grego =

Italian aviator (1894 – 1917)

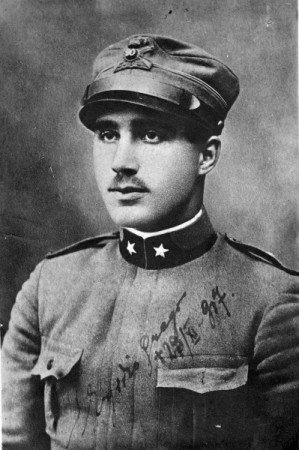
- Grego in 1917
- Born: 23 January 1894; Orsera, Istria, Austria-Hungary
- Died: 23 November 1917 (aged 23); Jesolo, Kingdom of Italy
- Military career
- Allegiance: Kingdom of Italy
- Branch: Regia Marina
- Service years: 1915–1917
- Conflicts: World War I; First Battle of the Isonzo; Battle of Asiago; Battle of Caporetto; First Battle of Monte Grappa
- Awards: Silver Medal of Military Valor (twice); Bronze Medal of Military Valor (twice)

Egidio Grego (23 January 1894 – 23 November 1917) was an Italian soldier and aviator who was awarded four medals for military valour, two of which were Silver Medal of Military Valor.

== Biography ==
Egidio Grego was born in 1894 into an Italian family in the Istrian town of Orsera. At the outbreak of the First World War in 1914 he was called up by the Austro-Hungarian army, and sent to the officer cadet school in Gorizia. When Italy declared war on Austria-Hungary on 24 May 1915, Grego deserted and, together with his cousin Ernesto Gramaticopulo, swam across the Italian-Austrian border through the Judrio river. Once he reached Bologna, he enlisted in the Regio Esercito and for security reasons changed his name. Framed in the 35th Infantry Regiment of the "Pistoia" Brigade, in July 1915, during the first battle of the Isonzo, Grego fought on the Austrian bridgehead of Podgora, earning himself a bronze medal for bravery. He was thus promoted to officer and transferred to the 74th "Lombardy" Infantry Regiment. In June of the following year, Grego led a unit of machine guns during the Austro-Hungarian offensive on the Asiago Plateau. On this occasion, he was taken prisoner and, although not recognized, managed to escape and return to the Italian lines. In July of the same year, he managed to get himself framed as an observer in the 253rd Squadron of the newly formed Italian military aviation.

In spring 1917, he was a lieutenant observer of the 253rd Squadron. On 2 May, two Macchi L.3 (in which Grego was also on board) dropped bombs near San Sabba in Trieste. On 25 May the Macchi of the Second Chief Helmsman Luigi Zoni and Grego, engaged in the escort of the Torpedo Armed Motorboat (MAS) of Lieutenant Luigi Rizzo, forced to ditching a type A hydro, which had attacked them 7 miles east of Muggia, in the port of Trieste. On 23 September, the Macchi of the voluntary motonaut pilot Giovanni Ravelli and Grego was attacked by two Oeffag H FB (A-11) water destroyers, including the flying ace Gottfried von Banfield and with the engine hit, he managed to return to Grado.

After Caporetto, he took part in the defence of the Piave, where he died on 23 November 1917, shot down in an aerial duel by the Albatros D.III Franz Gräser, a flying ace with 18 kills.

After his death, his fellow townsmen placed a plaque dedicated to him on the old tower bell in Orsera's main square.
