= Rosemarie Greco =

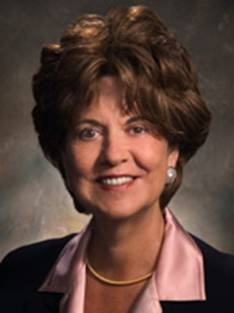

Rosemarie Greco is the current co-chairwoman of VISION 2020, a national initiative for women's economic and social equality. The initiative works with affiliated organizations to advance issues important to women. Greco began her career in the financial services industry as a bank branch secretary, eventually becoming one of the highest-ranking women in banking in the United States.

== Education ==
Greco is a magna cum laude graduate of St. Joseph's University and has received honorary degrees from Temple University, Cabrini University, Albright College, and Thomas Jefferson University.

== Early life ==
Before entering the financial services industry, Greco taught in Philadelphia's Catholic schools.

Greco served on the School District of Philadelphia's Board of Education for four years.

Greco chaired the board of trustees for the Philadelphia Award, served on the board of directors for the Franklin Institute, and was a trustee for her alma mater. She also chaired the Greater Philadelphia Chamber of Commerce, one of the largest business Chambers in the U.S. During her tenure, she received the Paradigm Award.

During the past dozen years, she has held director, trustee, and committee chair positions for nine public and privately held corporations in various business sectors, most recently Sunoco, Inc. and the Pennsylvania Real Estate Investment Trust.

== Career ==
=== CoreStates ===
She was the chief executive officer and president of CoreStates Bank, N.A. and president of its parent corporation, CoreStates Financial Corp. During her tenure, the bank was ranked as the eighteenth largest in the United States.

=== Fidelity Bank and First Fidelity Bancorporation ===
Greco served as president and chief executive officer of Fidelity Bank and as senior executive vice president, chief retail officer, and director of First Fidelity Bancorporation.

=== Health care reform ===
Greco is also involved in civic and community leadership, including six years as a member of Governor Edward G. Rendell's Administration as executive director of the Governor's Office of Health Care Reform, a cabinet-level position.

During her time in the Office of Health Care Reform, her proposals included codifying and expanding scope-of-practice parameters for nurses and non-physician healthcare professionals; an agreement with the State's Blue Cross/Blue Shield plans that resulted in a contribution of several hundred million dollars to provide health insurance for uninsured, low-wage workers; the country's first comprehensive law requiring health-care-acquired infection reporting from hospitals and nursing homes; and statewide initiatives of the Chronic Care Commission.

She currently works to provide quality and affordable healthcare in Pennsylvania.

=== Corporate and non-corporate positions ===
Greco is currently a director of Exelon Corporation, chair of its compensation committee, and a member of its Executive, Governance, and Energy Delivery committees. She also serves as a director of the board of PECO Energy, a subsidiary of Exelon Corporation. Greco is also a trustee of SEI MUTUAL FUNDS, chair of its governance committee, and director of the Pennsylvania Real Estate Investment Trust, where she chairs its nominating and governance committee. She is also a director emeritus of the board of directors of the Philadelphia Orchestra.

Her current non-corporate positions include chair of the board of overseers of the School of Nursing, University of Pennsylvania, a founding advisory board member of ASAP, an after-school activity program for inner-city youth, and co-chair of VISION 2020.

She has served the City of Philadelphia as chair of the first Women's Commission, as a member of the City Planning Commission, as chair of a task force that drew the charter for Mayor Rendell's Office for Management, Productivity, and Planning, and as a member of the executive committee of the founding board of Philadelphia's Special Service District. Greco also served the Commonwealth of Pennsylvania as a member of the Casey Philadelphia Special Judiciary Nominating Panel, the Advisory Commission for the Department of Banking, as a member of Pennsylvania 2000, a statewide coalition for education reform, and as a member of the Foundation for a Drug-Free Pennsylvania.

She founded and chaired the School-to-Career Leadership Council, personally recruiting and engaging chief executive officer colleagues of the city's major corporations to assume leadership responsibility for the Philadelphia School District's Community Resource Boards. She has served on the executive committee of the Business Public School Partnership for Reform and as chairman of the Philadelphia Youth Network. She founded and co-chaired the Campaign for Human Capital for the School District of Philadelphia, which aimed to hire and retain certified teachers for the city's schools and students.

She served as interim president and CEO of the Philadelphia Private Industry Council, affecting the agency's turnaround and establishing the infrastructure for implementing Pennsylvania and Philadelphia's Welfare to Work Program.

She was chair of the Philadelphia Compact, a joint venture between the Pew Foundation and the Annenberg Canter for Public Policy.

Five years after courting the Women's NCAA to bring the Final Four to Philadelphia, Greco was co-chair of Philadelphia's sponsoring organization.

== Awards ==
She is the recipient of several awards, including appointment as the "Distinguished Daughter of Pennsylvania" "Lucretia Mott Women's Way Award" in 1998, The "John Wanamaker Award," and the U.S. Marine Corp's "Semper Fidelis Award."

== Publications ==
Greco's career, management style, and business accomplishments have been documented and reviewed in major publications and books on leadership, sales, and financial management. She has also authored articles that have appeared in financial and business publications, including the Harvard Business Review.
