= Begi, Croatia =

Begi Beghi
- Village
- Location within Croatia
- Coordinates: 45.1730933°N 13.697228°E
- Country: Croatia
- County: Istria County
- Municipality: Vrsar

Area
  - Total: 0.35 sq mi (0.9 km^{2})

Population (2021)
  - Total: 31
  - Density: 89/sq mi (34/km^{2})
- Time zone: UTC+1 (CET)
  - Summer (DST): UTC+2 (CEST)
- Postal code: 52450 Vrsar
- Area code: 052

Begi (Italian: Beghi) is a village in the municipality of Vrsar, in Istria, Croatia.

== Demographics ==
According to the 2021 census, its population was 31.
