= Rose Grieco =

American writer

Rose Grieco in 1961

Rose Grieco (1915–1995) was an American writer. She was born in Montclair, New Jersey, to Italian immigrant parents. Her short stories and plays are grounded in Italian-American culture and written with affection and humor.

Two of her plays, Anthony on Overtime and Daddy, Come Home, were presented at the Blackfriars Theatre in New York in the early 1960s to positive reviews. The production of her plays marked the beginning of a "notable burst" of dramatic works by Italian-American women playwrights. Grieco's short stories and articles have been published widely in journals and anthologies, including Helen Barolini's The Dream Book: An Anthology of Writings by Italian American Women (1985).

In addition to writing, Grieco received awards for her efforts to preserve and promote Italian folk culture in the United States. She was active in Italian-American organizations such as Unico National, and founded the Italian Folklore Group of Montclair. She led a folkdancing club in Montclair, and wrote about Italian folk dances such as the tarantella. Her papers are on file with the Historical Society of Pennsylvania.
