= Jacquie Greco =

American ice hockey player

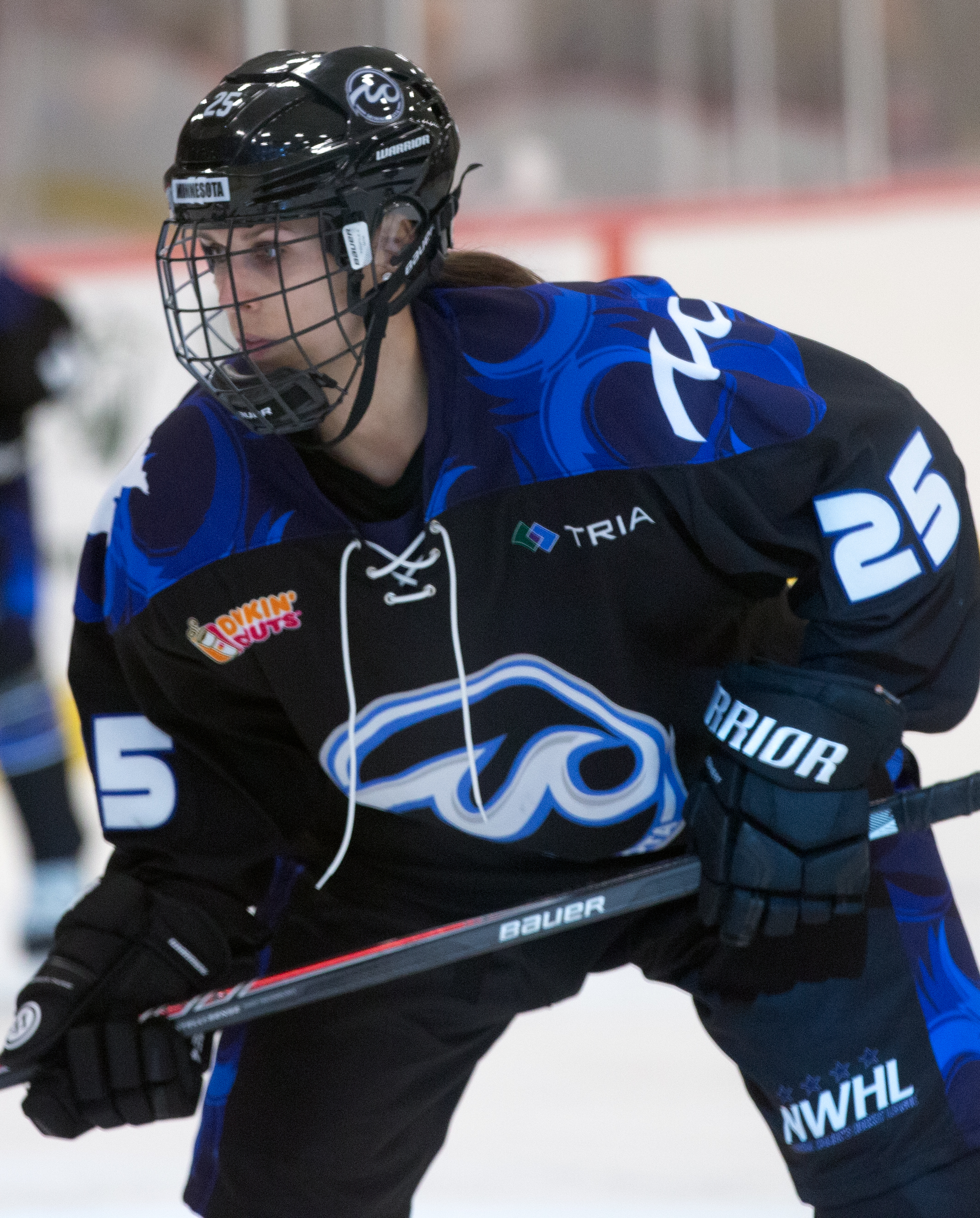
- Greco with the Minnesota Whitecaps in 2018
- Born: 30 May 1991 (age 34) Buffalo, New York, U.S.
- Height: 5 ft 7 in (170 cm)
- Position: Defence
- Shoots: Right
- PWHPA team Former teams: Team WSF (New Hampshire); Buffalo Beauts
- Played for: Syracuse Orange
- National team: United States
- Playing career: 2016–present

Jacquie Greco (born May 30, 1991) is an American professional ice hockey player for the Professional Women's Hockey Players Association (PWHPA). Previously played for the Buffalo Beauts of the National Women's Hockey League (NWHL).

== Personal life ==
Greco is a graduate of Syracuse University, where she played in the NCAA for four seasons between 2009 and 2013. Greco was co-captain for the women's ice hockey team in her senior year.

As a student at Syracuse University, Greco helped design the 'Tock' app in 2014. The app won the Syracuse University's Fast Forward competition and $7,500 at the Raymond von Dran IDEA Awards.

== NWHL ==
Greco joined the squad for the Buffalo Beauts in the 2016/17 NWHL season. Greco scored her first NWHL goal on 3 December 2016 against the New York Riveters. As a player with the Buffalo Beauts, Greco won the 2017 Isobel Cup.
