= Roberto Greco =

Italian artist

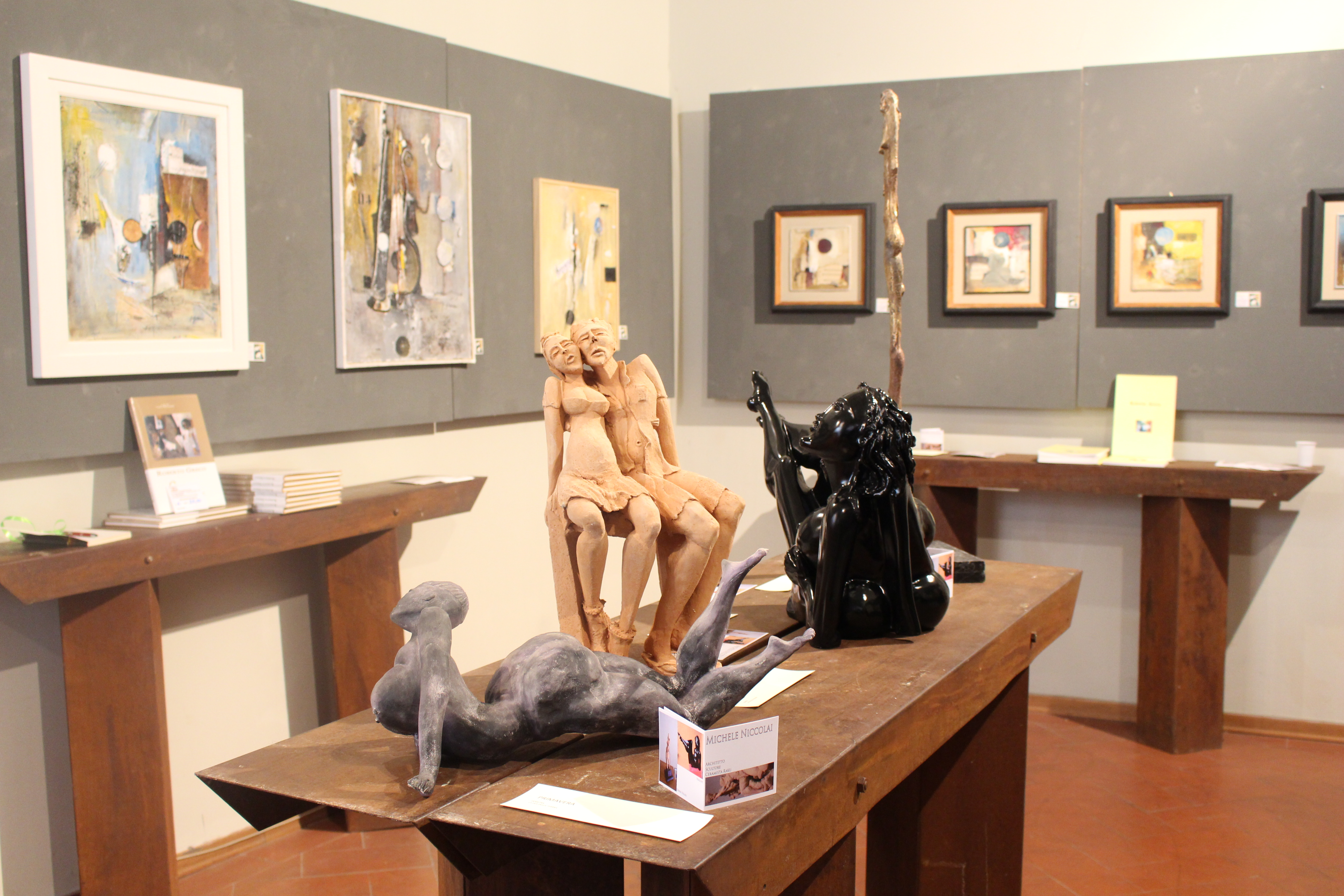
- Mostra di Roberto Greco e Michele Niccolai
- Born: Benghazi, Libia
- Movement: Informal
- Awards: In 1976 first prize at the National Contest “Maestri Fiorentini”, in 1984 first prize at the Biennale di San Giovanni Battista di Firenze

Roberto Greco is an Italian artist, living and working in Florence.

== Early life ==
Greco was born in Benghazi to Italian parents. In the mid-1960s, he began to study painting by attending the classes of well-known masters of the Art School and the Academy of Fine Arts in Florence, including Antonio Bueno, Siro Salimbeni and the School of Nude. He was a student of Osman Lorenzo De Scolari.

== Career ==
In 1984, he made a mural at the Stadio Artemio Franchi of Firenze and won the first prize at the Biennale di San Giovanni Battista in Florence.

In 1986, he started to exhibit in Italy and Europe and in the contemporary art fairs at Bologna, Padova, Florence and in other countries.

In 2018, La Pergola Arte awarded him the title of painter of the year 2018.
