= Common Ground High School =

Location
- 358 Springside Avenue; New Haven, New Haven County, Connecticut 06515; United States

Information
- Type: Charter School
- Motto: Pride, Ownership, Wonder, Effort, Respect (POWER)
- Established: 1997 (29 years ago)
- Status: Open
- CEEB code: 070474
- Director: Cherry Pacquette-Emmanuel
- Teaching staff: 25.40 (FTE)
- Grades: 9-12
- Enrollment: 223 (2023-2024)
- Average class size: 47
- Student to teacher ratio: 8.78
- Campus: Urban
- Colors: Forest green and white
- Sports: Basketball
- Team name: Hawks
- Newspaper: Hawk News
- Website: www.commongroundct.org

Common Ground High School (CGHS) is a charter school in New Haven, Connecticut, United States. It was founded in 1997 in the first round of charter schools created in Connecticut and is the oldest environmental charter school in the United States. The school subsequently expanded to reach approximately 180 students. Students are admitted by lottery and any Connecticut high school student is eligible to apply.

Common Ground is located on 20 acres of city park land at the base of West Rock Ridge State Park in New Haven, near the Southern Connecticut State University campus. The school is a program of the New Haven Ecology Project, a non-profit organization that also operates a community environmental education center and urban farm on the same site.

In 2013, work began on a new building and campus improvements that would allow the school to grow to 225 students. This building was completed in the spring 2016.

== Awards and recognition ==
- 2011: Green Prize in Public Education Merit Award, National Environmental Education Foundation
- 2012: Presidential Innovation Award in Environmental Education, U.S. Environmental Protection Agency (for Lizanne Cox, school director)
- 2013: Green Ribbon School, U.S. Department of Education
- 2013: School of Distinction, Connecticut State Department of Education
