= Sebastiano Greco =

Italian volleyball player (born 1953)

Personal information
- Nationality: Italian
- Born: 11 February 1953 (age 72); Catania, Italy

Sport
- Sport: Volleyball

Sebastiano Greco (born 11 February 1953) is an Italian volleyball player. He competed in the men's tournament at the 1980 Summer Olympics.
