= Maria Greco =

Italian electrical engineer

Maria Sabrina Greco (born 1968) is an Italian electrical engineer focused on signal processing for radar detection, radar clutter modeling, and cognitive radar. She is a professor in the Department of Information Engineering at the University of Pisa, and president of the IEEE Aerospace and Electronic Systems Society.

== Education and career ==
Greco is originally from Lecce, where her parents were schoolteachers. She studied telecommunications engineering at the University of Pisa, earning a laurea in 1993 and completing her Ph.D. in 1998; while a doctoral student, she was also a visiting researcher at Georgia Tech in the US.

She has been affiliated with the Department of Information Engineering at the University of Pisa since 1993 and became a full professor there in 2016. She has served as editor-in-chief of IEEE Aerospace and Electronic Systems Magazine, and was elected president of the IEEE Aerospace and Electronic Systems Society for a two-year term beginning in 2024.

== Recognition ==
Greco was the 2008 recipient of the Fred Nathanson Young Engineer of the Year Award of the IEEE Aerospace and Electronic Systems Society. She was elected as an IEEE Fellow in 2011, "for contributions to non-Gaussian radar clutter modeling and signal processing algorithms". She was a distinguished lecturer for the IEEE Signal Processing Society from 2014 to 2015 and for the IEEE Aerospace and Electronic Systems Society from 2015 to 2017, and again from 2020 to 2024.

Her best paper awards include the M. Barry Carlton Award in 2001 and 2012, and the Harry Rowe Mimno Award in 2019.

== Selected publications ==
=== Books ===
- Saponara, Sergio; Greco, Maria; Ragonese, Egidio; Palmisano, Giuseppe; Neri, Bruno (2014), Highly Integrated Low Power Radars, Artech House, ISBN 9781608076659
- Maio, Antonio De; Greco, Maria Sabrina (2015), Modern Radar Detection Theory, Institution of Engineering and Technology, ISBN 9781613531990
- Messer, Hagit; Bugallo, Monica; Greco, Maria Sabrina; Ahmad, Fauzia (2022), Women in Signal Processing, Frontiers in Signal Processing, Frontiers Media, ISBN 9782832500507
- Greco, Maria Sabrina; Cassioli, Dajana; Ullo, Silvia Liberata; Lyons, Margaret J. (2023), Women in Telecommunications, Women in Engineering and Science, Springer International Publishing, doi:10.1007/978-3-031-21975-7, ISBN 9783031219757

=== Articles ===
- Lombardo, P.; Greco, M.; Gini, F.; Farina, A.; Billingsley, J.B. (July 2001), "Impact of clutter spectra on radar performance prediction", IEEE Transactions on Aerospace and Electronic Systems, 37 (3): 1022–1038, Bibcode:2001ITAES..37.1022L, doi:10.1109/7.953265. Winner, M. Barry Carlton Award, 2001.
- Sangston, K. J.; Gini, F.; Greco, M. S. (January 2012), "Coherent radar target detection in heavy-tailed compound-Gaussian clutter", IEEE Transactions on Aerospace and Electronic Systems, 48 (1): 64–77, Bibcode:2012ITAES..48...64S, doi:10.1109/taes.2012.6129621. Winner, M. Barry Carlton Award, 2012.
- Gurbuz, Sevgi Zubeyde; Griffiths, Hugh D.; Charlish, Alexander; Rangaswamy, Muralidhar; Greco, Maria Sabrina; Bell, Kristine (December 2019), "An overview of cognitive radar: past, present, and future", IEEE Aerospace and Electronic Systems Magazine, 34 (12): 6–18, Bibcode:2019IAESM..34l...6G, doi:10.1109/maes.2019.2953762. Winner, Harry Rowe Mimno Award, 2019.
