= Alessandro Grego =

Italian composer and theater and film score author

Alessandro Grego (born 18 March 1969, Trieste) is an Italian contemporary classical composer, theatre and film score author.

== Biography ==
He studied composition with Giorgio Gaslini, electronic music with Curtis Roads, musicology at the School of Palaeography, Musical Philology of Cremona and Music for Films at the Experimental Film Centre in Rome.

In 2023, in Radom, Poland, he won the first prize at the international composition competition "Arboretum," conceived by the Polish composer Krzysztof Penderecki, with a violin concerto with string orchestra titled "The Eternal Sea," inspired by a collection of poems by Biagio Marin and dedicated to the memory of Edda Serra, a literary critic and scholar of his work. Additionally, the composer received a special prize created by Elżbieta Penderecka, Penderecki's wife. In 2025, he is recognized for his musical achievements by the Carl Reinecke International Music Competition.

=== Theatre ===
In 2008, he composed the original music for the show Senza vincitori né vinti (Without winners or losers). The play, starring Francesco Niccolini and Arnoldo Foà, is inspired by the novel Storia di Tönle by the Italian writer andveteran Mario Rigoni Stern. It deals with the absurdity of war, seen through the experience of an elderly farmer of the Asiago Plateau in the Italian Alps; the location of battles between Austrians and Italians during World War I.

In 2010, he wrote the music for the show Fuejs that was directed by Luciano Roman. Texts and lyrics in Friulian were provided by the Italian director, poet and writer Pier Paolo Pasolini. The show was inspired by Pasolini's youthful experience in the Friuli region.

In 2013, he collaborated with Giorgio Barberio Corsetti's "Fattore K" company on the show "In flagrante delicto - Il principe, la sposa, il musico e l'assassino". The show was written by Francesco Niccolini and inspired by the figure of the madrigalist Gesualdo da Venosa who killed his wife and her lover.

He also collaborated in other theatrical productions with Alessio Boni, Paolo Bonacelli, Giuseppe Patroni Griffi and Vittorio Caprioli, Simone Cristicchi, Marco Paolini, David Riondino, Manuela Kustermann and Vito Zagarrio.

=== Other works ===
In 1999 he composed the electronic opera L'aura which was selected for preservation by the electroacoustic music phonotheque of the National Library of France.

In 2003, he dedicated himself to Heliossea, a live show with music, images and interactions with the audience. The performance with flutes (Roberto Fabbriciani) and electronic music has the peculiarity of taking place in the early morning, at dawn, and being regulated by environmental parameters such as the sunrise and surrounding environmental sounds thanks to an algorithm developed by Grego at the Institute of Computer Music and Sound Technology in Zurich. The work was carried out in collaboration with the Italian National Institute of Astrophysics and the astrophysicist Massimo Ramella of the Astronomical Observatory of Trieste. The performance is reprised in 2023, twenty years after the first edition, in the park of Miramare Castle in Trieste under the title "Heliossea XX," still featuring Fabbriciani but this time with Alvise Vidolin directing the sound.

In 2006, he wrote the song Le corps e(s)t l'histoire for clarinet and live electronics, dedicated to the memory of Pier Paolo Pasolini and commissioned by the Institut International de Musique Électroacoustique in Bourges (IMEB).

In 2004, he published a monographic anthology Un mar deserto with the participation of Arnoldo Foà, produced by the Municipality of Trieste with the scientific support of the Biagio Marin Study Centre.

In 2011, he worked on the song Persistenza della memoria, originated from a research on sound carried out at WDR Cologne together with Nicola Sani. The song is the very first composition ever to use the hyperbass flute, the largest and lowest-pitched instrument in the flute family designed by Roberto Fabbriciani.

In the 90s, he collaborated on RAI (the Italian national public broadcasting company) radio dramas. He composed music for documentaries such as Galois. The story of a revolutionary mathematician dedicated to Évariste Galois and produced, among others, for the International Higher School of Advanced Studies, ICTP of Trieste and the L. Bocconi Commercial University of Milan and Binari, broadcast by RAI.

In 2022, he created "SARS-CoV-2: The Complete Genome," the sonification of the nucleic acid sequence of the complete genome of the SARS-CoV-2 virus.

In 2023, he published "I Colori Di Rives," which acoustically represents the paintings of the Perugian artist Riccardo Veschini, known as Rives.

== Artistic profile ==
Alessandro Grego composed works of contemporary and experimental music. He wrote several soundtracks and incidental music for the theatre and for movies and radio scripts produced by RAI. He collaborated with the flute player Roberto Fabbriciani, experimenting with new sounds for this instrument and with other performers such as Guido Arbonelli, Massimiliano Damerini, Filippo Faes, Anna Serova, Giuseppe Fricelli, the quartet "Martinu", Serge Conte, Paolo Pollastri, Ciro Scarponi and Emanuele Segre.

== Discography ==
=== Albums ===
- 1999 – L'aura, Agorà AG 209.1
- 1999 – Return to the sea, The Orchard/Sony Music formerly Awal
- 2003 – Un mar deserto, Urbania U −101
- 2012 – Senza vincitori né vinti, The Orchard/Sony Music formerly Awal
- 2014 – Anima, The Orchard/Sony Music formerly Awal
- 2014 – Constraints, The Orchard/Sony Music formerly Awal
- 2018 – Heliossea 2, The Orchard/Sony Music formerly Awal
- 2018 – El mar xe un, CD Baby ruALB01241263
- 2018 – Galois: Storia di un matematico rivoluzionario, The Orchard/Sony Music formerly Awal
- 2018 – Binari, The Orchard/Sony Music formerly Awal
- 2019 – Sky Zoo Phrenia, The Orchard/Sony Music formerly Awal
- 2019 – CO_{2}, The Orchard/Sony Music formerly Awal
- 2020 – Pianonirico, The Orchard/Sony Music formerly Awal
- 2020 – Strings, The Orchard/Sony Music formerly Awal
- 2022 – SARS-CoV-2: The Complete Genome, The Orchard/Sony Music
- 2023 – I Colori di Rives, The Orchard/Sony Music
- 2025 – Heliossea XX, Tactus

=== Singles ===
- 2017 – Indio, The Orchard/Sony Music formerly Awal
- 2017 – Caronte, The Orchard/Sony Music formerly Awal
- 2017 – Le corps e(st l'histoire, The Orchard/Sony Music formerly Awal
- 2017 – L'ascolto dello spazio… Gropina, The Orchard/Sony Music formerly Awal
- 2017 – Ascolta i tuoi occhi, The Orchard/Sony Music formerly Awal
- 2018 – Metamorli, The Orchard/Sony Music formerly Awal

=== DVDs ===
- 2011 – Heliossea, VDM Records VDM038-018

=== Collaborations ===
- 1998 – Astor Piazzolla: Histoire du tangowith Roberto Fabbriciani and Stefano Cardi, Phoenix Classics PH 97319
- 2004 – Flute XX Volume Two with Roberto Fabbriciani, ARTS 47702-2
- 2010 – The flute in 21st century with Roberto Fabbriciani, Tactus TC 950601

=== Musical Editions ===
Some scores are freely available on the International Music Score Library Project (IMSLP) while others are edited by RAI Com.
