= Ralph S. Greco =

American sculptor

Ralph Steven Greco
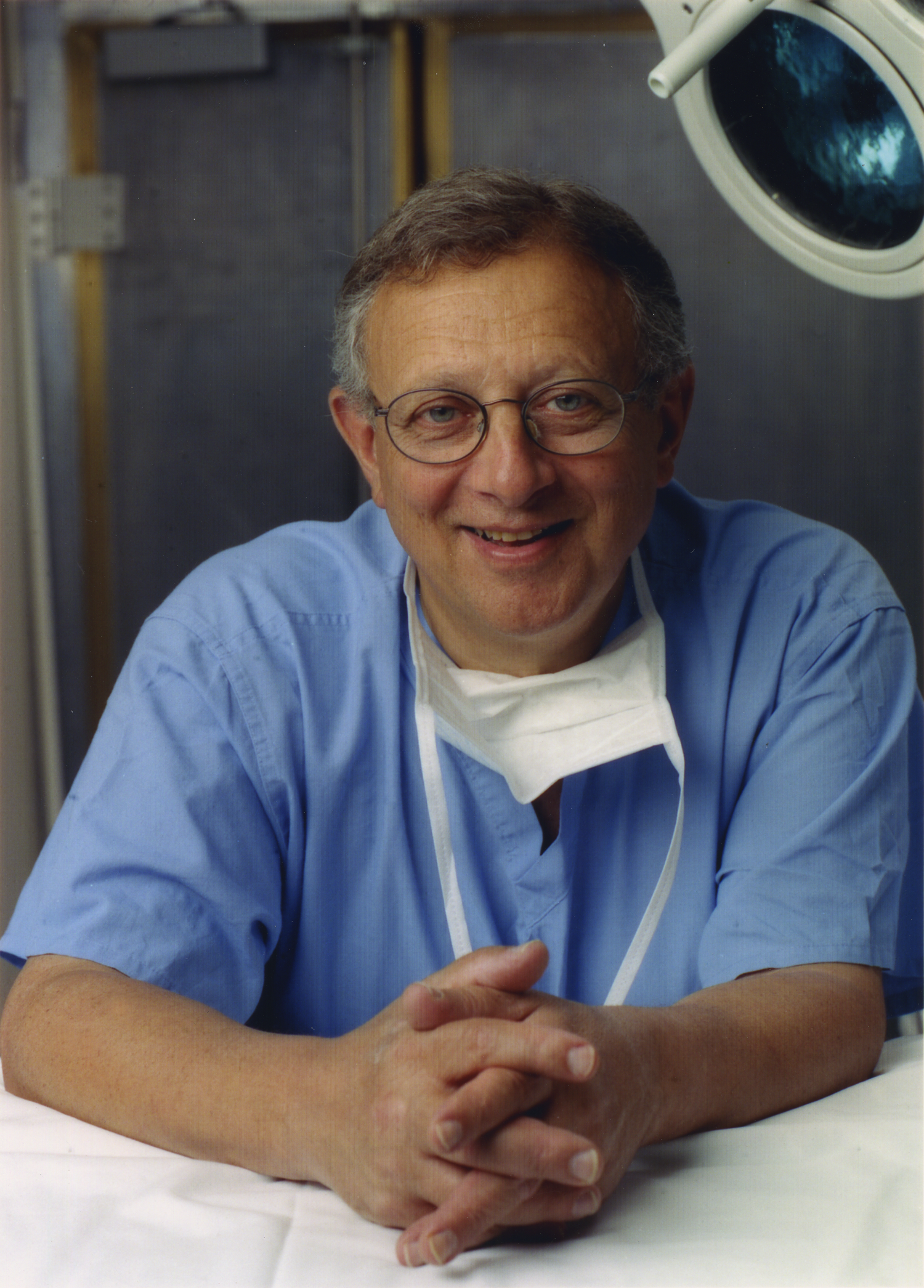
- Born: May 25, 1942; Bronx, New York City, U.S.
- Died: March 31, 2019 (aged 76); Stanford, California, U.S.
- Occupation: Professor

Academic background
- Education: Mount Saint Michael Academy; Fordham University; Yale University School of Medicine

Academic work
- Institutions: Stanford University
- Website: ralphsgreco.com

Ralph Steven Greco (May 25, 1942 – March 31, 2019) was the Johnson and Johnson Distinguished Professor, Emeritus of Surgery at Stanford University School of Medicine. He was a leader of the resident Well Being in surgery movement and surgical training program leader.

== Early life and education ==
Greco attended Mount Saint Michael Academy (1956 - 1960).

In 1964 Greco began the study of medicine at Yale University. During his junior year he decided to pursue surgery and was accepted into the Yale Training Program. He interned in 1968-69 and also was an American Cancer Society Fellow. He also served as a surgeon at Hôpital Albert Schweitzer in Haiti. This began a lifelong commitment to healthcare in Haiti as well as a passion for Haitian art. He completed the chief residency at Yale in 1973.

== Career ==
=== Rutgers Medical School ===
He joined the faculty at Rutgers (later Robert Wood Johnson Medical School) as an Assistant Professor of Surgery in 1975. His clinical practice included general, vascular and pediatric surgery. In 1978 in collaboration with Richard Harvey Ph D, professor of biochemistry, Greco developed the hypothesis that bio-materials could be rendered infection resistant by bonding antibiotics to their surfaces. This research resulted in a grant from the NIH in 1979 as well as multiple patents. He was promoted to Associate Professor and in 1983 to Professor of surgery. Thereafter he was appointed Director of the General Surgery Residency Program and Chief of General Surgery.

=== Stanford University ===
Greco accepted the offer of Stanford University to become the J & J Chair, Chief of General Surgery and Director of the General Surgery Training Program effective July 1, 2000.

From 2001 to 2005, Greco modernized and developed subspecialties in surgical oncology, colorectal surgery, minimal access surgery and trauma.

=== Balance in Life ===
In this time frame Greco began his work on resident well being. This path was determined by one of his chief residents who, 5 months after graduation, committed suicide. First he worked with a small number of faculty and residents to create a well being program entitled Balance in Life, which became a model for others. Greco received the 2011 John Gienapp Award for lifetime contributions to GME, the highest honor given by the ACGME.

=== Sculpture ===
In 1987 Greco became interested in sculpture and studied under Lilli Gettinger for 5 years. Before moving to Stanford he had five exhibitions in the Northeast. Greco donated one of his pieces to Rutgers and donated two sculptures to Stanford in 2018.

== Awards and honors ==
- Parker J Palmer Courage to Teach Award (2006)
- John Gienapp Award (2011)
- Shumway Society Lifetime Achievement Award (2016)
- Named one of 50 Notable Faculty by Stanford University
- Named one of Notable Alumni by Yale University School of Medicine

== Personal life ==
Greco married to Irene L. Wapnir, M.D., professor of surgery at Stanford. Together they had 3 children. He died on March 31, 2019, at the age of 76.
