= Michael S. Greco =

American lawyer

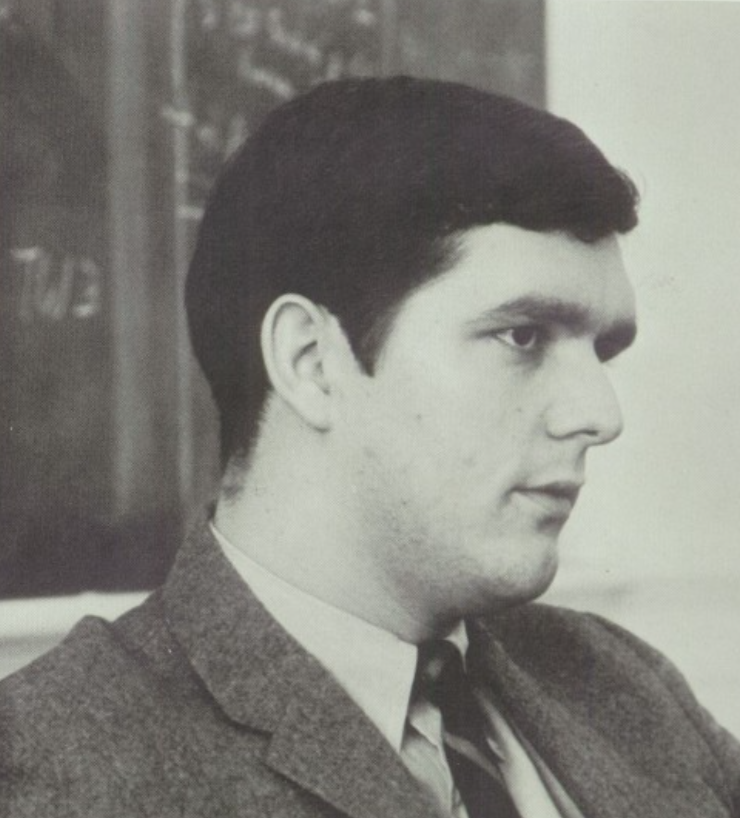
- Greco in 1969.
- Born: Michael Spencer Greco; November 22, 1942 (age 83); Rende, Italy
- Education: Princeton University (BA); Boston College (JD)
- Occupation: Lawyer
- Spouse: Dianne

Signature
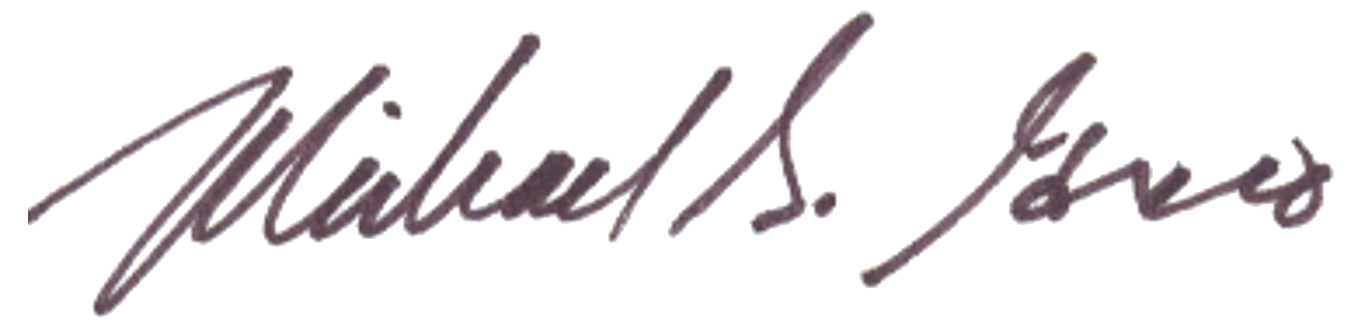

Michael Spencer Greco (born November 22, 1942, in Rende, Italy) is an American lawyer who served as president of the American Bar Association (2005–2006). He is a retired partner in the Boston office of K&L Gates, and a former partner at the now-defunct Hill and Barlow. He was a partner with Hill and Barlow from 1973 to 2002 and was a partner with K&L Gates from 2003 to 2017.

== ABA Presidency ==
As President of the American Bar Association, undertook a variety of projects including

- a Commission on a Renaissance of Idealism in the Legal Profession, co-chaired by US Supreme Court Associate Justice Ruth Bader Ginsburg and Theodore C. Sorensen, intended to help re-invigorate lawyers' commitment to providing pro bono legal services.
- a Commission on Civic Education and the Separation of Powers, co-chaired by US Supreme Court Associate Justice Sandra Day O’Connor and former US Senator Bill Bradley, sought to educate Americans about constitutional democracy.
- the ABA Task Force on Access to Civil Justice, chaired by Maine Supreme Judicial Court Associate Justice Howard Dana, Jr., to consider providing legal services to millions of poor Americans.
- the ABA Task Force on Hurricane Katrina to help provide free legal services to victims of Katrina and other hurricanes that devastated the Gulf States in the fall of 2005.

In total, Greco created two commissions, five task forces, and several other special committees.

He appointed the ABA Executive Director Search Committee which conducted a year-long national search for the Association's new Executive Director, Henry F. White, Jr., who took office on September 1, 2006.

In addition to serving as its President, Mr. Greco has long been active in the American Bar Association, including serving on the Board of Governors, in the House of Delegates for more than twenty years, and as the elected ABA State Delegate from Massachusetts during 1993-2004. He chaired the Association's Standing Committee on Federal Judiciary, the Section of Individual Rights & Responsibilities, the Executive Committee of the Conference of State Delegates, the Steering Committee of the Nominating Committee, the ABA Day in Washington Planning Committee, and other committees. Following the September 11, 2001, terrorist attacks in the US, he served on the ABA Task Force on Terrorism and the Law, and helped develop policies relating to the imperative of balancing national security and constitutional freedoms so that both are protected.

Mr. Greco is a member of the American Law Institute.

== Massachusetts/New England professional activities ==
Mr. Greco served as president of the Massachusetts Bar Association, the New England Bar Association, the New England Bar Foundation and the Board of Trustees of Massachusetts Continuing Legal Education.

As MBA president, among other initiatives, he and Governor Michael S. Dukakis appointed a blue-ribbon Commission on the Unmet Legal Needs of Children, whose report and recommendations led to enactment of new statutes protecting the legal rights of children.

By appointment of the Justices of the Massachusetts Supreme Judicial Court he chaired the Court's Special Committee on Pro Bono Legal Services in the late 1990s.

He served for eight years on Gov. William Weld's Massachusetts Judicial Nominating Council, and in 1993-94 served on Senator Edward M. Kennedy and Senator John F. Kerry's Special Commission on Federal Judicial Appointments that recommended candidates for vacancies on the federal bench, US Attorney and US Marshal.

He also served as Vice-Chair of the Board of Bar Overseers of the Massachusetts Supreme Judicial Court, and on the Board of Overseers of Newton-Wellesley Hospital.

He is a member of the Board of Directors of the New England (Business) Council, and during 1998-2004 served as Chair of the ground breaking Creative Economy Initiative, a regional economic/cultural development effort designed to attract investment in New England’s Creative Economy.

== Criticism of President George W. Bush for signing statements ==
In the spring of 2006, President Greco created a blue ribbon task force in order to address the issue that President Bush, instead of vetoing bills passed by Congress that he finds objectionable, signs the bill, but attaches statements that indicates intentions not to follow certain provisions. Greco and the ABA responded to this by saying that the president's signing statements revoke Congress's constitutional authority to check and balance the executive power. This is highly significant because all American presidents in office before President Bush have issued a combined total of 600 signing statements. Bush, however, has issued 800 signing statements over a 5 1/2 year period during his term. Previous presidents, such as George H. W. Bush and Bill Clinton, have issued signing statements as well; however, these presidents only expressed disapproval of certain provisions in a bill, but did not assert the right to ignore them. The report released by the task force declared, "The Constitution is not what the President says it is."

The task force that Greco created was bipartisan. The participants included William Sessions, Mickey Edwards, and Bruce Fein.

== Personal life and education ==
Michael Greco spent his youth in Hinsdale, Illinois, and has resided in Wellesley, Massachusetts, for the past forty years.

He obtained his Juris Doctor from Boston College Law School in 1972. Here he served as editor in chief of the Boston College Law Review and as class president. He also clerked for Judge Leonard P. Moore on the United States court of appeals for the Second Circuit. He earned his Bachelor of Arts in English at Princeton University in 1965. Before he went to law school, he taught English at Phillips Exeter Academy in Exeter, New Hampshire.
