= Michael Greco (police officer) =

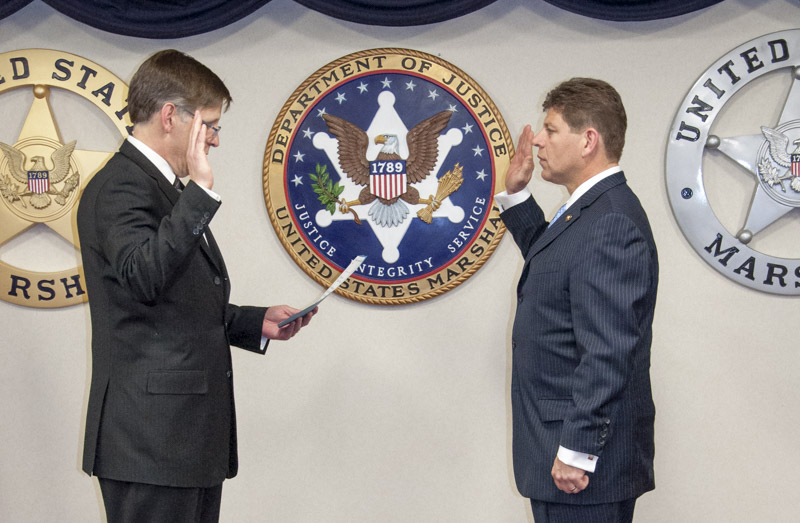
- Greco being sworn in by Deputy Director David Harlow in Washington, DC
- Born: The Bronx, New York, U.S.
- Education: Excelsior University; State University of New York at Cortland; Pearl River High School
- Known for: United States Marshal - Southern District of New York
- Spouse: Sabrina Vargas-Greco
- Police career
- Department: US Department of Justice; NYS Division of State Police
- Branch: United States Marshals Service (2015-2019); New York State Troopers (1982-2015)
- Awards: 2017 Ellis Island Medal of Honor

Michael Greco is an American law enforcement official. He was a United States Marshal for the Southern District of New York. Sworn in on 15 April 2015, Greco was officially nominated by President Barack Obama on 12 November 2014. Greco was approved by the Senate Judiciary Committee on 22 January 2015, unanimously confirmed by the Senate on 12 March 2015, and appointed by President Obama five days later on 17 March 2015. Greco became the first Latino to hold the post of US Marshal for the Southern District of New York.

Before accepting the position of US Marshal, Michael Greco served as a Lieutenant in the New York State Police, a position he held since 2007, and in which he served as the New York State Police's inter-agency liaison in New York City. Greco has served with the New York State Police since 1982; prior to his being promoted to Lieutenant, he served as a Senior Investigator, Investigator, Station Commander, Sergeant, and Trooper. Greco was also a first responder after the terrorist attacks of 11 September 2001. He graduated from Pearl River High School in Rockland County, New York, matriculated at the State University of New York at Cortland, and later received his Associate of Arts (A.A.) Degree in 2012 from Excelsior University.
