= Saint Greca =

Italian Roman Catholic saint

Saint Greca (12 October 284 – 21 January 304, Decimomannu) was a Christian woman who lived on Sardinia. According to tradition she was martyred during the Diocletianic Persecution. She is venerated as a saint by the Catholic Church.

== History ==
Tradition holds that the saint was a Christian living in Decimomannu in the 3rd and 4th centuries who was imprisoned and whipped. She was then tortured by having three nails hammered into her head to try to force her to recant her faith, before finally being beheaded in 304.

Though there are no sources attesting to her martyrdom's historicity, the cult around saint Greca the martyr dates back at least to the 14th century, when she is mentioned in several documents, especially those referring to the convent at Decimo, which was attached to the church of Santa Greca. That monastery dated back to the 9th century - a coffin for a nun named Greca from that era has been found in Fangariu Cagliari. A document of 1413 relating to the appointment of an abbess refers to the "monastery and church of saint Greca, martyr, in the town of Decimo" - this is the earliest reference to saint Greca as a martyr. The present church was rebuilt in the 18th century but still includes the 11th century semi-circular apse reusing proto-Roman building material.

In 1618 an inscribed tombstone from the 4th or 5th century was rediscovered, rediscovered in Decimomannu near the ancient church of Santa Greca in 1560. It records a woman called Greca aged 20 years, 2 months and nineteen days and that she was buried on 21 January. Based on these dates and assuming 304 was the year she died, her birthdate has been hypothesized as 12 October 284. The inscription also bears the Christ monogram and precedes Greca's name with B. M., the Latin abbreviation for Beatae memoriae (of blessed memory) or Bene merenti (well worthy), rather than as previously thought Beata Martyr (blessed martyr).

The inscription was soon linked to the existing cult of saint Greca and Francisco d'Esquivel, archbishop of Cagliari inserted a festival of saint Greca into his diocese's liturgical calendar. In 1633 excavations at the church began - these unearthed a single tomb in the church, containing a single human skeleton. Considered to be relics of saint Greca, the skeleton was divided in two, with half being placed in the Sanctuary of the Martyrs in Cagliari Cathedral and the other half remaining at Decimo. At the request of the Sacred Congregation of Rites the feast of saint Greca was removed from the diocese's calendar in 1882, only for the Congregation to re-insert it the following year among feasts honoured by local cults. By a decree dated 31 May 2016, Arrigo Miglio, Metropolitan Archbishop of Cagliari, made the church of Santa Greca into a diocesan sanctuary under the title of "Sanctuary of Saint Greca Virgin and Martyr of Decimomannu". On 22 September the same year a Holy Door was opened at the church and it remained open throughout the festivities around Greca's saint's day.

== Bibliography ==
- Giovanni Spano. Storia della chiesa di Santa Greca presso Decimo Manno ed esercizio spirituale in lingua vernacola che dai divoti si pratica in detta chiesa. Cagliari, Tipografia Alagna, 1876.
