= 2025–26 SEF Torres 1903 season =

Italian football club season 2025-26

SEF Torres 1903
2025–26 season
- Manager: Michele Pazienza
- Stadium: Stadio Vanni Sanna
- Serie C Group B: 15th
- Coppa Italia Serie C: Second round
- Biggest win: 2–1 Livorno; 1–0 Pontedera

The 2025–26 season is the 123rd in the history of Torres Calcio and the club’s fourth consecutive season in Serie C of Italian mens' football. In addition to the domestic league, Torres competes in the Coppa Italia Serie C. The season began on 16 August 2025.

== Squad ==
=== Transfers in ===
Pos.	Player	Transferred from	Fee	Date	Source
MF	(Argentina) Patricio Alexis Goglino	(Italy) Sestri Levante	Loan return	30 June 2025	
DF	(Italy) Sajmir Dumani	(Italy) Chieri	Undisclosed	4 July 2025	
DF	(Italy) Riccardo Stivanello	(Italy) Bologna	Loan	23 July 2025	
FW	(Italy) Antonino Musso	(Italy) Sorrento	€200,000	2 August 2025	
MF	(Italy) Ernesto Starita	(Italy) Benevento	Loan	28 August 2025	
MF	(Argentina) Mateo Scheffer Bracco	(Italy) Carrarese	Loan	1 September 2025	

=== Transfers out ===
Pos.	Player	Transferred to	Fee	Date	Source
FW	(Portugal) Muhamed Varela Djamanca	(Italy) Reggiana	Loan return	30 June 2025	
DF	(Burkina Faso) Abdoul Guiebre	(Italy) Modena	Loan return	30 June 2025	
FW	(Italy) Manuel Fischnaller	(Italy) Trapani	€100,000	19 July 2025	
FW	(Italy) Luca Zamparo	(Italy) Vicenza	Loan return	28 July 2025	
MF	(Argentina) Patricio Alexis Goglino	(Italy) Caldiero Terme	Loan	20 August 2025	

== Friendlies ==
27 July 2025	Venezia	5–0	Torres	Longarone
17:30				Stadium: Stadio comunale di Longarone

13 August 2025	Torres	2–0	Alghero

== Competitions ==
=== Overall record ===
Competition	First match	Last match	Starting round	Record							
Competition	First match	Last match	Starting round	Pld	W	D	L	GF	GA	GD	Win %
Serie C	23 August 2025	26 April 2026	Matchday 1	5	1	2	2	4	6	−2	20.00
Coppa Italia Serie C	16 August 2025		First round	1	1	0	0	2	1	+1	100.00
Total				6	2	2	2	6	7	−1	33.33

Last updated: 20 September 2025
Source: Competitions

=== Serie C ===
Group B

==== Results summary ====
Overall								Home						Away					
Pld	W	D	L	GF	GA	GD	Pts	W	D	L	GF	GA	GD	W	D	L	GF	GA	GD
5	1	2	2	4	6	−2	5	1	1	1	2	3	−1	0	1	1	2	3	−1

Last updated: 20 September 2025.

==== Results by round ====
Round	1	2	3	4	5	6
Ground	H	A	H	A	H	A
Result	W	L	L	D	D	
Position	2	10	16	14	15	

Updated to match(es) played on 20 September 2025. Source:
A = Away; H = Home; W = Win; D = Draw; L = Loss

==== Matches ====
23 August 2025 1	Torres	1–0	Pontedera	Sassari
17:30 UTC+2	Zecca 30'			Stadium: Stadio Vanni Sanna; Attendance: 3,228; Referee: Michele Pasculli

30 August 2025 2	Campobasso	2–1	Torres	Campobasso
18:00 UTC+2	Bifulco 22', 81'		Musso 65'	Stadium: Stadio Nuovo Romagnoli; Attendance: 4,380; Referee: Alessandro Colelli

6 September 2025 3	Torres	0–2	Pianese	Sassari
17:30 UTC+2			Simeoni 47'; Bellini 83'	Stadium: Stadio Vanni Sanna; Referee: Filippo Colaninno

14 September 2025 4	Bra	1–1	Torres	Sestri Levante
15:00 UTC+2	Sinani 36'		Diakité 74'	Stadium: Stadio Giuseppe Sivori; Attendance: 229; Referee: Andrea Mazzer

20 September 2025 5	Torres	1–1	Ternana	Sassari
15:00 UTC+2				Stadium: Stadio Vanni Sanna; Referee: Nicolò Dorillo

23 September 2025 6	Juventus Next Gen	v	Torres	Alessandria
18:30 UTC+2				Stadium: Stadio Giuseppe Moccagatta

=== Coppa Italia Serie C ===
16 August 2025 First round	Torres	2–1	Livorno	Sassari
21:00 UTC+2	Lunghi 9'; Musso 40'		Marchesi 70'	Stadium: Stadio Vanni Sanna; Attendance: 2,060; Referee: Alessandro Pizzi

28–30 October 2025 Second round	Arezzo	v	Torres
