= 2025–26 US Pianese season =

Italian football club season 2025-26

US Pianese
2025-26 season
- Manager: Alessandro Birindelli
- Stadium: Stadio Comunale
- Serie C Group B: 12th
- Coppa Italia Serie C: First round
- Biggest defeat: Giuliano 4-1

The 2025–26 season is the 96th in the history of Unione Sportiva Pianese and the club's second consecutive season in Serie C of the Italian football league. In addition to the domestic league, Pianese competes in the Coppa Italia Serie C. The season began on 17 August 2025.

== Squad ==
=== Transfers In ===
Pos.	Player	Transferred from	Fee	Date	Source
FW	(Canada) Easton Ongaro	(Italy) Trapani	Loan	1 July 2025	
DF	(Italy) Wisdom Amey	(Italy) Bologna U20	Loan	15 July 2025	
DF	(Ghana) Claudio Martey	(Italy) Sassuolo U20	Free	16 July 2025	
MF	(Italy) Marco Bertini	(Italy) Lazio	Free	6 August 2025	
MF	(Guinea) Mamadou Pathe Balde	(Italy) Cagliari U20	Free	9 August 2025	
GK	(Italy) Tommaso Bertini	(Italy) Atalanta U23	Loan	10 August 2025	
DF	(Italy) Matteo Gorelli	(Italy) Rimini	Free	20 August 2025	
FW	(Italy) Luca Fabrizi	(Italy) Pineto	Undisclosed	26 August 2025	
DF	(Italy) Lorenzo Coccia	(Italy) Arezzo	Loan	28 August 2025	
FW	(Italy) Andrea Sodero	(Italy) Empoli	Loan	1 September 2025	

=== Transfers Out ===
Pos.	Player	Transferred to	Fee	Date	Source
DF	(Italy) Federico Pacciardi	(Italy) Siracusa	Free	29 July 2025	

== Friendlies ==
2 August 2025	Pianese	4–0	Grosseto

7 August 2025	Pianese	4–1	Gavorrano

10 August 2025	Pianese	2–1	Aquila Montevarchi
	Vigiani 58'; Bertini M. 68'	Report	Bocci 8'	Attendance: 227

== Competitions ==
=== Overall record ===
Competition	First match	Last match	Starting round	Final position	Record							
Competition	First match	Last match	Starting round	Final position	Pld	W	D	L	GF	GA	GD	Win %
Serie C	23 August 2025	26 April 2026	Matchday 1		5	1	3	1	3	2	+1	20.00
Coppa Italia Serie C	16 August 2025		First round	First round	1	0	0	1	1	4	−3	0.00
Total					6	1	3	2	4	6	−2	16.67

Last updated: 20 September 2025
Source: Competitions

=== Serie C ===
Group B

==== Results summary ====
Overall								Home						Away					
Pld	W	D	L	GF	GA	GD	Pts	W	D	L	GF	GA	GD	W	D	L	GF	GA	GD
5	1	3	1	3	2	+1	6	0	1	1	1	2	−1	1	2	0	2	0	+2

Last updated: 20 September 2025.

==== Results by round ====
Round	1	2	3	4	5	6
Ground	A	H	A	H	A	H
Result	D	L	W	D	D	
Position	11	16	9	9	12	

Updated to match(es) played on 20 September 2025. Source:
A = Away; H = Home; W = Win; D = Draw; L = Loss

==== Matches ====
23 August 2025 1	Ascoli	0–0	Pianese	Ascoli Piceno
18:00 UTC+2				Stadium: Stadio Cino e Lillo Del Duca; Attendance: 9,718; Referee: Jules Roland Andeng Tona Mbei

31 August 2025 2	Pianese	0–1	Carpi	Piancastagnaio
18:00 UTC+2			Cortesi 44'	Stadium: Stadio Comunale; Attendance: 672; Referee: Davide Cerea

6 September 2025 3	Torres	0–2	Pianese	Sassari
17:30 UTC+2			Simeoni 47'; Bellini 83'	Stadium: Stadio Vanni Sanna; Referee: Filippo Colaninno

13 September 2025 4	Pianese	1–1	Sambenedettese	Piancastagnaio
15:00 UTC+2	Fabrizi 45+4'		Eusepi 36'	Stadium: Stadio Comunale; Attendance: 1,093; Referee: Valerio Vogliacco

20 September 2025 5	Vis Pesaro	0–0	Pianese	Pesaro
15:00 UTC+2				Stadium: Stadio Tonino Benelli; Referee: Davide Gandino

23 September 2025 6	Pianese	v	Arezzo	Piancastagnaio
18:30 UTC+2				Stadium: Stadio Comunale

=== Coppa Italia Serie C ===
16 August 2025 First round	Giugliano	4–1	Pianese	Giugliano in Campania
18:00	Nepi 14'; Njambè 60'; Baldé 86'; Prado 90+1'		Bertini 77'	Stadium: Stadio Alberto De Cristofaro; Attendance: 327; Referee: Alessandro Colelli
