= Demetrio Greco =

Italian footballer (born 1979)

Personal information
- Full name: Demetrio Alessandro Greco
- Date of birth: 10 August 1979 (age 47)
- Place of birth: Cosenza, Italy
- Height: 1.86 m (6 ft 1 in)
- Position: Goalkeeper

Team information
- Current team: Potenza (GK coach)

Senior career*
Years	Team	Apps	(Gls)
1995–1998	Rende	51	(0)
1998–1999	Montalto	26	(0)
1999–2001	Nuova Acri	51	(0)
2001–2003	L'Aquila	35	(0)
2004	Messina	1	(0)
2004–2005	Giulianova	20	(0)
2005	YF Juventus	12	(0)
2006	Luzern	0	(0)
2006–2007	Aarau	7	(0)
2007–2009	Castrovillari	0	(0)
2009–2010	Acireale	0	(0)
2010–2011	Montalto	0	(0)
2013–2014	Rende		
2014	Sambiase		

Managerial career
- 2014–2015: Rende (youth GK coach)
- 2015–2019: Rende (GK coach)
- 2019–2021: Virtus Francavilla (GK coach)
- 2021–2022: Potenza (GK coach)
- 2022–: Potenza (GK coach)
- * Club domestic league appearances and goals

Demetrio Alessandro Greco (born 10 August 1979) is an Italian football coach and a former player who is the goalkeeping coach with Potenza.

== Career ==
He was signed by Messina of Serie B on 29 January 2004.
