= Graziano Nocera =

Italian footballer and coach

Personal information
- Date of birth: 24 March 1973 (age 53)
- Place of birth: Gioia Tauro, Italy
- Position: Midfielder

Senior career*
Years	Team	Apps	(Gls)
1991–1992	Cosenza	0	(0)
1993–1994	→ Matera	1	(0)
1993–1996	Vigor Trani	62	(5)
1996–1998	Castrovillari	55	(5)
1998–1999	Nocerina	14	(1)
1999	Catanzaro	15	(0)
1999–2002	Nocerina	78	(3)
2001–2002	Palmese	11	(2)
2002–2003	Nocerina	14	(0)
2003–2004	Tivoli	27	(1)
2004	Rosarnese	17	(1)
2004	Tivoli	16	(0)

Managerial career
- 2019–2020: Reggina U-17
- 2020–2021: Cittanovese (assistant)
- 2021–2022: Cittanovese
- 2021–2023: Gioiese 1918
- 2023–: Cittanovese
- * Club domestic league appearances and goals as of 19 May 2023 ‡ National team caps and goals as of 27 March 2023

Graziano Nocera (born 24 March 1973) is an Italian football manager and former player who played as a midfielder.

== Playing career ==
Nocera spent the majority of his career in the Serie C division. He commenced his professional journey with Cosenza during the 1991–92 Serie B season, though he did not make any appearances due to an injury. Following a year of inactivity resulting from this injury, he moved on loan to Matera in Serie C, amassing just a single appearance.

In the subsequent season, 1993–94, Nocera joined Vigor Trani, also competing in Serie C, where he made 62 appearances and scored 5 goals. Three years later, in the 1996–97 season, he transferred to Castrovillari Calcio, where he contributed 55 appearances and replicated his goal-scoring ability with 5 goals.

After a two-year stint, he transitioned to Nocerina Calcio, yet his impact was less pronounced, registering just 14 appearances and a solitary goal. During the ongoing season, in the winter transfer window of 1999, he moved to Catanzaro, remaining in Serie C, where he managed 15 appearances without finding the back of the net. Later that same year, in the summer transfer market, he returned to Nocerina, where he would shine over a span of three years, accumulating 78 appearances and scoring 3 goals.

Following this three-year tenure, in the 2001–02 season, he joined Palmese, located in the Campania region. However, his impact was limited, amassing only 11 appearances and scoring two goals. The following year saw his return to Nocerina, where he made a mere 14 appearances. In his final season, 2003–04, he featured in 27 matches and scored a solitary goal. Subsequently, he briefly joined Rosarnese and Vigor Trani in 2004 before his retirement.

== Coaching career ==
After his retirement, Nocera embarked on a coaching career in youth football schools and academies. Following the attainment of his UEFA A coaching license in 2019, he began his professional coaching journey with the youth team of Reggina, Reggina U-17 where he stayed for a year. In 2020, he assumed the role of assistant coach for Cittanovese, and during the ongoing season, in 2021, the head coach resigned, leading to his appointment as the team's head coach.

In the summer of 2021, he took on the coaching role at Gioiese. In his first year with the team, they secured promotion from Promozione to Eccellenza Calabra. In the second year, they successfully made the leap from Eccellenza Calabra to Serie D, also winning the Coppa d'Eccellenza and the Supercoppa d'Eccellenza. After these achievements with Gioiese, he gained the affectionate nickname "Mr. Triplete".

Since the summer of 2023, he has returned to Cittannova, where he is coaching the team once again, reuniting with the city's football club he had previously managed.
