= Maicol Origlio =

Italian footballer

Personal information
- Date of birth: 17 February 1997 (age 29)
- Place of birth: Turin, Italy
- Height: 1.83 m (6 ft 0 in)
- Position: Left-back

Team information
- Current team: Giulianova

Youth career
- 2012–2016: Torino

Senior career*
Years	Team	Apps	(Gls)
2016–2020	Monza	53	(4)
2019	→ Giana Erminio (loan)	10	(0)
2019–2020	→ Rende (loan)	24	(1)
2020–2021	Torres	24	(2)
2021	Muravera	10	(0)
2021–2024	Follonica Gavorrano	48	(2)
2023–2024	→ L'Aquila (loan)	15	(2)
2024–2026	Desenzano	30	(1)
2026–	Giulianova	0	(0)
- * Club domestic league appearances and goals as of 3 May 2026

Maicol Origlio (born 17 February 1997) is an Italian professional footballer who plays as a left-back for Serie D club Giulianova.

== Club career ==
On 10 June 2016, he signed with Monza. On 16 January 2019, he joined Giana Erminio on loan. On 18 July 2019, he joined Rende on loan.

== Honours ==
=== Club ===
Monza

- Serie D: 2016-17
- Scudetto Dilettanti: 2016-17

Follonica Gavorrano

- Coppa Italia Serie D: 2021–22
