= Karasavvidis =

Karasavvidis (Greek: Καρασαββίδης) is a Greek surname. Notable people with the surname include:

- Aris Karasavvidis (born 1965), Greek footballer
- Theofilos Karasavvidis (born 1971), Greek footballer
