= 2021–22 Coppa Italia Serie D =

Tournament details
- Country: Italy
- Dates: 11 September 2021 – 1 June 2022
- Teams: 172

Final positions
- Champions: Follonica Gavorrano
- Runners-up: Torres

Tournament statistics
- Matches played: 171
- Goals scored: 480 (2.81 per match)

The 2021−22 Coppa Italia Serie D was the 22nd edition of Coppa Italia Serie D.

== Format and seeding ==
The teams enter the competition at various stage, as follows.

- First stage
  - Preliminary round: it is contested by 88 teams
  - First round: the 44 winners of the preliminary round and the 84 teams who did not play the preliminary round face each other
- Final stage
  - Round of 64: the 64 winners face each other
  - Round of 32: the 32 winners face each other
  - Round of 16: the 16 winners face each other
  - Quarter-finals: the 8 winners face each other
  - Semi-finals: the 4 winners face each other
  - Final: the 2 winners face each other

== Schedule ==
Phase	Round	Clubs remaining	Clubs involved	From previous round	Entries in this round	Dates
First stage	Preliminary round	172	88	none	88	11–12 September 2021; 20 October 2021
First stage	First round	128	128	44	84	12 September 2021; 22 September 2021; 13 October 2021; 20 October 2021; 3 November 2021
Final stage	Round of 64	64	64	64	none	3 November 2021; 10 November 2021; 17 November 2021
Final stage	Round of 32	32	32	32	none	24 November 2021; 15 December 2021; 9 March 2022
Final stage	Round of 16	16	16	16	none	5 January 2022; 16 January 2022; 9 February 2022; 9 March 2022; 19 March 2022
Final stage	Quarter-finals	8	8	8	none	20 March 2022; 20 April 2022; 30 April 2022
Final stage	Semi-finals	4	4	4	none	11 May 2022
Final stage	Final	2	2	2	none	1 June 2022

== Preliminary round ==
Preliminary round results
Tie no	Home team	Score	Away team
11 September 2021
1.	Aprilia	3–1	Team Nuova Florida
2.	Fossano	2–1	Chieri
12 September 2021
3.	Afragolese	2–1	Real Agro Aversa
4.	Ambrosiana	1–0	San Martino Speme
5.	Arezzo	0–1	Foligno
6.	Arzachena	0–1	Atletico Uri
7.	Athletic Carpi	2–1	Mezzolara
8.	Atletico Terme Fiuggi	1–1 (4–5 p)	Montespaccato
9.	Bagnolese	1–0	Borgo San Donnino
10.	Bisceglie	0–3	Nola
11.	Brindisi	2–1	Virtus Matino
12.	Caravaggio	0–0 (5–3 p)	Tritium
13.	Casertana	w/o	Gladiator
14.	Cavese	1–0	San Giorgio
15.	Città di Sant'Agata	1–1 (3–4 p)	Cittanova
16.	Città di Varese	2–2 (4–5 p)	Arconatese
17.	Dolomiti Bellunesi	1–2	Levico Terme
18.	Este	1–4	Campodarsego
19.	Flaminia	2–1	Real Monterotondo Scalo
20.	Folgore Caratese	0–0 (4–5 p)	Alcione
21.	Francavilla	2–1	Rotonda
22.	Gozzano	1–0	Borgosesia
23.	Gravina	1–1 (5–4 p)	Fasano
24.	Lamezia Terme	1–1 (4–5 p)	Rende
25.	Montebelluna	3–0	Spinea
26.	Muravera	0–2	Torres
27.	Novara	3–0	RG Ticino
28.	Ostia Mare	1–0	UniPomezia
29.	Paternò	2–2 (2–4 p)	Giarre
30.	Poggibonsi	1–1 (2–4 p)	Scandicci
31.	Ponte San Pietro	1–0	Villa Vale
32.	Portici	2–0	Mariglianese
33.	Porto d'Ascoli	1–1 (4–3 p)	Nereto
34.	Progresso	2–0	Cattolica
35.	Ravenna	3–0	Sasso Marconi
36.	Saluzzo	2–0	Asti
37.	Sancataldese	3–1	Troina
38.	Seravezza Pozzi	3–0	Cascina
39.	Tolentino	1–1 (4–3 p)	Fano
40.	Vado	3–1	Ligorna
41.	Vastogirardi	3–2	Aurora Alto Casertano
42.	Virtus CiseranoBergamo	5–1	Leon
43.	Vis Nova Giussano	3–1	Brianza Olginatese
20 October 2021
44.	Chieti	1–1 (3–4 p)	Sambenedettese

== First round ==
First round results
Tie no	Home team	Score	Away team
12 September 2021
1.	Recanatese	4–1	Castelfidardo
22 September 2021
2.	Acireale	1–1 (4–2 p)	Giarre
3.	Adriese	1–2	Delta Porto Tolle
4.	Aglianese	0–3	Scandicci
5.	Aprilia	2–0	Ostia Mare
6.	Arzignano	2–1	Sona
7.	Athletic Carpi	3–1	Forlì
8.	Atletico Uri	0–3	Trastevere
9.	Audace Cerignola	2–0	Nola
10.	Bitonto	1–0	Brindisi
11.	Bra	0–1	Vado
12.	Breno	3–0	Real Calepina
13.	Brusaporto	1–1 (3–5 p)	Caravaggio
14.	Caldiero Terme	3–0	Ambrosiana
15.	Carbonia	0–0 (6–7 p)	Lanusei
16.	Caronnese	2–0	Sangiuliano City Nova
17.	Cartigliano	4–0	Campodarsego
18.	Casatese	2–3	Virtus CiseranoBergamo
19.	Castellanzese	3–2	Legnano
20.	Cavese	2–0	Portici
21.	Cjarlins Muzane	2–2 (3–5 p)	Union Clodiense Chioggia
22.	Correggese	4–1	Bagnolese
23.	Cynthialbalonga	2–2 (5–4 p)	Montespaccato
24.	Desenzano Calvina	1–2	Franciacorta
25.	Fanfulla	2–1	Crema
26.	FC Messina	1–1 (3–2 p)	San Luca
27.	Flaminia	5–1	Rieti
28.	Fossano	4–1	Saluzzo
29.	Francavilla	5–2	Castrovillari
30.	Gelbison	0–1	Santa Maria Cilento
31.	Giugliano	2–1	Afragolese
32.	Gladiator	1–0	Insieme Formia
33.	Gozzano	0–2	Novara
34.	Gravina	0–0 (1–4 p)	Team Altamura
35.	Latte Dolce	1–1 (7–8 p)	Torres
36.	Lavagnese	1–2	Sestri Levante
37.	Lentigione	1–2	Derthona
38.	Licata	1–0	Sancataldese
39.	Luparense	0–1	Levico Terme
40.	Matese	1–3	Vastogirardi
41.	Molfetta	1–0	Lavello
42.	Montebelluna	3–2	Mestre
43.	Nardò	2–2 (3–4 p)	Casarano
44.	Pineto	1–3	Castelnuovo Vomano
45.	PDHAE	1–1 (4–1 p)	Casale
46.	Ponte San Pietro	2–0	Arconataese
47.	Real Forte Querceta	1–0	Ghiviborgo
48.	Rende	2–2 (2–4 p)	Cittanova
49.	Rimini	1–1 (5–6 p)	Progresso
50.	Sammaurese	0–1	Ravenna
51.	San Nicolò Notaresco	3–2	Vastese
52.	Sangiovannese	0–2	Prato
53.	Sanremese	2–1	Imperia
54.	Seravezza Pozzi	2–2 (6–5 p)	Pro Livorno
55.	Sorrento	2–0	Nocerina
56.	Tiferno Lerchi	0–5	Foligno
57.	Tolentino	2–1	Montegiorgio
58.	Trapani	3–0	Biancavilla
59.	Trestina	2–2 (4–2 p)	Cannara
60.	Vis Artena	3–0	Cassino
61.	Vis Nova Giussano	2–1	Alcione
13 October 2021
62.	Follonica Gavorrano	1–0	Pianese
20 October 2021
63.	San Donato Tavarnelle	0–0 (4–2 p)	Lornano Badesse
3 November 2021
64.	Sambenedettese	1–0	Porto d'Ascoli

== Round of 64 ==
Round of 64 results
Tie no	Home team	Score	Away team
3 November 2021
1.	Athletic Carpi	2–1	Ravenna
2.	Audace Cerignola	2–1	Giugliano
3.	Caravaggio	1–2	Ponte San Pietro
4.	Casarano	0–0 (5–6 p)	Bitonto
5.	Castellanzese	1–3	Caronnese
6.	Castelnuovo Vomano	3–0	Vastogirardi
7.	Cynthialbalonga	3–1	Aprilia
8.	Delta Porto Tolle	0–0 (4–2 p)	Union Clodiense Chioggia
9.	Fanfulla	8–1	Vis Nova Giussano
10.	FC Messina	0–0 (3–2 p)	Acireale
11.	Franciacorta	0–3	Breno
12.	Follonica Gavorrano	1–1 (4–3 p)	San Donato Tavarnelle
13.	Lanusei	0–2	Torres
14.	Levico Terme	1–1 (4–3 p)	Cartigliano
15.	Montebelluna	1–3	Caldiero Terme
16.	Novara	1–2	PDHAE
17.	Progresso	1–2	Correggese
18.	Real Forte Querceta	1–4	Prato
19.	Recanatese	3–0	Tolentino
20.	Santa Maria Cilento	3–1	Cavese
21.	Scandicci	2–1	Flaminia
22.	Seravezza Pozzi	4–0	Sestri Levante
23.	Sorrento	0–0 (3–5 p)	Gladiator
24.	Team Altamura	2–2 (4–3 p)	Molfetta
25.	Trastevere	2–2 (3–4 p)	Vis Artena
26.	Trestina	1–2	Foligno
27.	Vado	0–2	Sanremese
28.	Virtus CiseranoBergamo	4–2	Arzignano
10 November 2021
29.	Cittanova	2–0	Francavilla
30.	Derthona	4–2	Fossano
31.	Trapani	2–0	Licata
17 November 2021
32.	Sambenedettese	1–1 (6–5 p)	San Nicolò Notaresco

== Round of 32 ==
Round of 32 results
Tie no	Home team	Score	Away team
24 November 2021
1.	Audace Cerignola	2–0	Team Altamura
2.	Breno	2–3	Caronnese
3.	Caldiero Terme	0–0 (3–2 p)	Levico Terme
4.	Correggese	0–1	Athletic Carpi
5.	Delta Porto Tolle	0–2	Virtus CiseranoBergamo
6.	Foligno	0–2	Scandicci
7.	Follonica Gavorrano	3–1	Seravezza Pozzi
8.	Gladiator	1–0	Bitonto
9.	PDHAE	2–5	Derthona
10.	Ponte San Pietro	1–1 (5–4 p)	Fanfulla
11.	Sanremese	2–2 (3–4 p)	Prato
12.	Santa Maria Cilento	3–4	Cittanova
13.	Trapani	2–0	FC Messina
14.	Vis Artena	2–3	Torres
15 December 2021
15.	Sambenedettese	1–2	Recanatese
9 March 2022
16.	Cynthialbalonga	0–0 (2–4 p)	Castelnuovo Vomano

== Round of 16 ==
Round of 16 results
Tie no	Home team	Score	Away team
5 January 2022
1.	Virtus CiseranoBergamo	3–3 (3–0 p)	Caldiero Terme
16 January 2022
2.	Prato	1–2	Follonica Gavorrano
9 February 2022
3.	Recanatese	2–2 (5–6 p)	Scandicci
9 March 2022
4.	Athletic Carpi	2–1	Ponte San Pietro
5.	Audace Cerignola	4–2	Gladiator
6.	Cittanova	1–0	Trapani
7.	Derthona	1–2	Caronnese
19 March 2022
8.	Castelnuovo Vomano	0–3	Torres

== Quarter-finals ==
Quarter-finals results
Tie no	Home team	Score	Away team
20 March 2022
1.	Follonica Gavorrano	2–0	Athletic Carpi
20 April 2022
2.	Caronnese	1–1 (4–5 p)	Virtus CiseranoBergamo
3.	Torres	0–0 (4–3 p)	Scandicci
30 April 2022
4.	Audace Cerignola	3–1	Cittanova

== Semi-finals ==
Semi-finals results
Tie no	Home team	Score	Away team
11 May 2022
1.	Audace Cerignola	2–2 (8–9 p)	Torres
2.	Follonica Gavorrano	2–1	Virtus CiseranoBergamo

== Final ==
1 June 2022	Follonica Gavorrano	2–1	Torres	Genzano di Roma
17:30 CEST (UTC+02:00)	Origlio 20'; Ampollini 62'	Report	Ruocco 38'	Stadium: Comunale Bruno Abbatini; Attendance: 1,200; Referee: Gianluca Renzi
