= Alessandro Godano =

Italian footballer (born 1997)

Personal information
- Full name: Alessandro Otranto Godano
- Date of birth: 28 July 1997 (age 29)
- Place of birth: Crotone, Italy
- Position: Winger

Team information
- Current team: Borgo San Donnino

Youth career
- –2016: Crotone

Senior career*
Years	Team	Apps	(Gls)
2016–2020	Rende	71	(3)
2021	Audace Cerignola	15	(1)
2021–2022	Fiorenzuola	8	(1)
2022–	Borgo San Donnino	0	(0)
- * Club domestic league appearances and goals as of 29 January 2022

Alessandro Otranto Godano (born 28 July 1997) is an Italian professional footballer who plays as a winger for Serie D club Borgo San Donnino.

== Club career ==
Formed in Crotone youth system, Godano signed for Rende, with which between 2017 and 2020 he made 51 appearances in Serie C with 2 goals and 3 assists.

For the 2020–21 he played for Serie D club Audace Cerignola.

On 29 July 2021, he joined to Fiorenzuola. His contract was terminated by mutual consent on 29 January 2022.

On 1 February 2022, he signed with Serie D club Borgo San Donnino.
