= Sassari International =

Defunct tennis tournament
- Tour: ILTF World Circuit
- Founded: 1966
- Abolished: 1971
- Editions: 6
- Location: Sassari; Italy
- Venue: Torres Stadium (1966-67) Aqueduct Stadium (1970-71)
- Surface: Clay / outdoor

The Sassari International was a FTPF/ILTF affiliated clay court tennis tournament founded in 1966. It was played in Sassari, Sardinia, Italy until 1971.

== History ==
The tournament was founded in 1966 with the event being played in two locations. Early rounds were held at the Torres Tennis Sassari club (founded in 1903), and from the quarter finals stage at the Torres Stadium, then later the Aqueduct Stadium.

== Finals ==
=== Men's singles ===
Included:

Year	Winners	Runners-up	Score
1966	(Italy) Nicola Pietrangeli	(Italy) Sergio Tacchini	6–3, 4–6, 6–1
1967	(Socialist Federal Republic of Yugoslavia) Boro Jovanovic	(Australia) Martin Mulligan	6–4, 6–4, 1–6, 4–6, 6–3
1970	(Chile) Jaime Pinto Bravo	(Socialist Federal Republic of Yugoslavia) Boro Jovanovic	6–2, 7–5, 1–6, 6–2
1971	(Italy) Sergio Palmieri	(Italy) Vittorio Crotta	6–3, 6–2, 6–0
