= Antonio Palumbo (footballer, born 2005) =

Italian footballer

Personal information
- Date of birth: 19 July 2005 (age 21)
- Place of birth: Gioia Tauro, Italy

Team information
- Current team: Reggina

Youth career
- 2011–201?: Virtus Gioia
- 201?–2019: Gioiese
- 2019–2023: Reggina
- 2023–2025: Pescara

Senior career*
Years	Team	Apps	(Gls)
2024–2025	Pescara	0	(0)
2025	→ Vibonese (loan)	14	(0)
2025–	Reggina	35	(1)
- * Club domestic league appearances and goals as of 29 June 2025

Antonio Palumbo (born 19 July 2005) is an Italian footballer who plays as right winger for Serie D club Reggina.

== Playing career ==
Antonio Palumbo began playing football at a young age in Gioia Tauro, the city where he was born. His early youth career alternated between youth teams like Virtus Gioia and Gioiese. In July 2019, he joined the youth academy of Reggina, where he played for both the U17 and U19 teams. Due to issues within the club, he was forced to leave in September 2023, after making 29 appearances and scoring 5 goals. Shortly before his departure, he scored a decisive goal in the play-outs, helping the youth team remain in Primavera 2.

Pescara subsequently signed him to play in Serie C but was later assigned to the U19 squad, where he made 35 appearances and scored 17 goals. He remained there for a season and a half before being loaned to Vibonese, in Serie D, midway through the 2024–25 season. On 15 July 2025, he officially signed with Reggina, in Serie D.
