= Emanuel Lazzarini =

Argentine footballer

Personal information
- Full name: Emanuel Damián Lazzarini
- Date of birth: January 20, 1987 (age 39)
- Place of birth: Casilda, Argentina
- Height: 1.80 m (5 ft 11 in)
- Position: Forward

Team information
- Current team: Nuova Gioiese

Youth career
- Newell's Old Boys

Senior career*
Years	Team	Apps	(Gls)
2007	Newell's Old Boys	2	(0)
2008–2009	Temperley	40	(1)
2009	Cobreloa	12	(5)
2010–2011	Correcaminos UAT	24	(4)
2011–2012	Gimnasia y Tiro	11	(3)
2012–2013	Gimnasia Concepción	23	(3)
2013–2015	Atlanta	34	(7)
2015	Mitre	18	(4)
2016–2017	Chaco For Ever	17	(3)
2017–2018	Unión de Sunchales	21	(2)
2018	Palmese		
2018	Nuorese		
2018–2019	US San Teodoro		
2019–2020	ASD San Luca		
2020	Siracusa		
2020	FC Sambiase		
2020–2021	Roccella	1	(0)
2021–2022	Tuttocuoio		
2022–	Nuova Gioiese		
- * Club domestic league appearances and goals as of 20:36, 11 August 2022 (UTC)

Emanuel Lazzarini (born January 20, 1987, in Casilda) is an Argentine professional footballer who plays for Nuova Gioiese.

== Career ==
Lazzarini debuted on 8 September 2007 in a 0–0 draw with Club Atlético Lanús.

In 2008 Lazzarini moved to third division side Temperley playing 40 matches and scored 1 goal against Estudiantes de Caseros.

Lazzarini moved to Chile, joining Cobreloa on 6 August 2009. He made his debut in a match versus Universidad Católica in 2–0 defeat. He played 12 games and scoring 5 goals and that led him to take an offer from Mexican club of Liga de Ascenso, Correcaminos UAT.

After spells at Gimnasia y Tiro and Gimnasia y Esgrima, Lazzarini joined Club Atlético Atlanta in July 2013

Lazzarini played for Club Atlético Mitre in 2015, and then played for Chaco For Ever. He joined Unión de Sunchales in August 2017

Ahead of the 2019–20 season, Lazzarini joined Italian club ASD San Luca. A year later, in July 20202, Lazzarini moved to Siracusa. In September 2020, he signed with FC Sambiase. Two months later, at the end of October 2020, he then joined Roccella. In August 2021, he joined Tuttocuoio. In July 2022, he signed for Nuova Gioiese.
