= Theofilos Karasavvidis =

Greek footballer (born 1971)

Personal information
- Date of birth: 27 April 1971 (age 55)
- Place of birth: Giannitsa, Greece
- Height: 1.82 m (6 ft 0 in)
- Position: Midfielder

Senior career*
Years	Team	Apps	(Gls)
1989–1995	Apollon Smyrnis	187	(20)
1995–1997	Olympiacos	27	(2)
1997–1999	Panionios	47	(14)
1999–2000	Polisportiva Sassari Torres	35	(20)
2000	Como	4	(0)
2001	Catania	8	(0)
2001–2002	Lanciano	32	(7)
2002–2003	Frosinone	7	(0)
2003–2004	Pro Patria	20	(0)
2004–2005	Monza	20	(1)
2005–2006	Caratese	29	(10)

International career
1993	Greece U21	1	(0)
1992–1995	Greece	5	(0)
- * Club domestic league appearances and goals

Theofilos Karasavvidis (Greek: Θεόφιλος Καρασαββίδης; born 27 April 1971) is a Greek former professional footballer who played as a midfielder.

== Club career ==
Theofilos Karasavvidis started his career in 1989 until 1995 in Apollon Smyrnis. In 1995 he moved to Olympiacos, where he won the Greek Championship in the season 1996–97. In 1997, he moved to Panionios where he won the Greek Football Cup in the season 1997–98 against Panathinaikos at Karaiskakis Stadium. In 1999, he moved to Italy, in Sassari, where he played for Polisportiva Sassari Torres, then for Como, for Catania and Lanciano. In 2002, he moved to Frosinone, Pro Patria, Monza and Caratese.

== International career ==
Karasavvidis in 1993 he played for Greece U21 in a friendly match against Germany U21 ended 3-3. He also played for Greece from 1992 until 1995, where on 29 January 1992, he made his debut in the senior team against Albania.

== After retirement ==
After retiring from competitive activity, he worked as a physiotherapist in a Wellness Center in Como. In February 2018, he returned to Sassari and was warmly welcomed by the Sassari Torres fans at the Stadio Vanni Sanna. He also became the agent of some players such as Marios Oikonomou, Dimitrios Diamantakos, Charalampos Lykogiannis. He is the agent of Dušan Vlahović and Alfredo Morelos.

== Career statistics ==
=== Club ===
Appearances and goals by club, season and competition
Club	Season	League			Cup		Europe		Other		Total	
Club	Season	Division	Apps	Goals	Apps	Goals	Apps	Goals	Apps	Goals	Apps	Goals
Apollon Smyrnis	1989–90	Alpha Ethniki	28	4	0	0	0	0	0	0	28	4
Apollon Smyrnis	1990–91	Alpha Ethniki	31	3	0	0	0	0	0	0	31	3
Apollon Smyrnis	1991–92	Alpha Ethniki	32	3	0	0	0	0	0	0	32	3
Apollon Smyrnis	1992–93	Alpha Ethniki	31	2	0	0	0	0	0	0	31	2
Apollon Smyrnis	1993–94	Alpha Ethniki	33	4	0	0	0	0	0	0	33	4
Apollon Smyrnis	1994–95	Alpha Ethniki	32	4	0	0	0	0	0	0	32	4
Olympiacos	1995–96	Alpha Ethniki	15	2	0	0	0	0	0	0	15	2
Olympiacos	1996–97	Alpha Ethniki	12	0	0	0	0	0	0	0	12	0
Panionios	1997–98	Alpha Ethniki	20	3	0	0	0	0	0	0	20	3
Panionios	1998–99	Alpha Ethniki	27	11	0	0	0	0	0	0	27	11
Sassari Torres	1999–2000	Serie D	32	18	0	0	0	0	0	0	32	18
Sassari Torres	2000–01	Serie C	3	1	0	0	0	0	0	0	3	1
Como	2000–01	Serie B	4	0	0	0	0	0	0	0	4	0
Catania	2000–01	Serie C	8	0	0	0	0	0	0	0	8	0
Lanciano	2001–02	Serie C	32	7	0	0	0	0	0	0	32	7
Frosinone	2002–03	Serie D	20	5	0	0	0	0	0	0	20	5
Pro Patria	2002–03	Serie C	7	0	0	0	0	0	0	0	7	0
Pro Patria	2003–04	Serie C	20	0	0	0	0	0	0	0	20	0
Monza	2004–05	Serie C	20	1	0	0	0	0	0	0	20	1
Caratese	2005–06	Serie C	29	29	0	0	0	0	0	0	29	10
Career total			436	95	0	0	0	0	0	0	436	95

=== International ===
Appearances and goals by national team and year
National team	Year	Apps	Goals
Greece	1992	1	0
Greece	1994	1	0
Greece	1995	3	0
Total		5	0

== Honours ==
Olympiacos

- Alpha Ethniki: 1996–97

Panionios

- Greek Cup: 1997–98

Sassari Torres

- Serie D: 1999–2000

Individual

- Serie C1 top scorer: 1999–2000 (19 goals)
