= Vasilios Kinalis =

Greek footballer

Personal information
- Date of birth: 22 April 1999 (age 27)
- Place of birth: Serres, Greece
- Height: 1.87 m (6 ft 2 in)
- Position: Goalkeeper

Team information
- Current team: Apollon Pontus
- Number: 34

Youth career
- 2013–2017: Atromitos

Senior career*
Years	Team	Apps	(Gls)
2017–2019	Atromitos	0	(0)
2018	→ Torres (loan)	14	(0)
2019–2022	Thesprotos	52	(0)
2022–2023	Apollon Smyrnis	0	(0)
2023–	Apollon Pontus	22	(0)

International career^{‡}
2015	Greece U16	1	(0)
2016	Greece U17	1	(0)
2017	Greece U19	3	(0)
- * Club domestic league appearances and goals as of 1 May 2022 ‡ National team caps and goals as of 4 September 2017

Vasilios Kinalis (Greek: Βασίλειος Κίναλης; born 22 April 1999) is a Greek professional footballer who plays as a goalkeeper for Super League 2 club Apollon Pontus.
