= Renato Greco =

Italian footballer

Personal information
- Date of birth: 20 January 1969 (age 57)
- Place of birth: Palermo, Italy
- Height: 1.80 m (5 ft 11 in)
- Position: Forward

Senior career*
Years	Team	Apps	(Gls)
1989–1991	Mazara	47	(10)
1991–1992	Pizzoli	30	(17)
1992–1996	Torres	123	(43)
1996–1997	Pescara	34	(3)
1997–1998	Salernitana	20	(7)
1998–2000	Lecce	13	(0)
1999	→ Monza (loan)	15	(0)
2000–2001	Savoia	47	(13)
2001–2002	Vis Pesaro	27	(4)
2002–2004	Foggia	42	(4)
2004–2005	Cremonese	19	(2)
2005–2007	Nocerina	57	(10)
2007	Cavaliere		
2007–2009	Gelbison	19	(2)
2009	Real Montecchio	14	(2)
2009–2010	Sulmona		
2010	Amiternina		
2010–2011	Angizia Luco		
Total		507	(117)
- * Club domestic league appearances and goals

Renato Greco (born 20 January 1969) is an Italian former professional footballer who played as a forward.

== Career ==
Having started his career at Mazara, Greco stood out playing for several teams, especially Torres, Salernitana, Cremonese and Foggia, where he was champion in the lower divisions of Italian football. Currently, he works at the USD Follonica Gavorrano.

== Honours ==
Torres

- Nazionale Dilettanti: 1992–93 (group F)

Salernitana

- Serie B: 1997–98

Foggia

- Serie C2: 2002–03 (group C)

Cremonese

- Serie C1: 2004–05 (group A)
