= Charalampos Tsoulfas =

Greek footballer

Personal information
- Full name: Charalampos Tsoulfas
- Date of birth: 2 July 2000 (age 26)
- Place of birth: Greece
- Height: 1.94 m (6 ft 4 in)
- Position: Goalkeeper

Team information
- Current team: Ifestos Peristeri

Youth career
- –2018: Acharnaikos

Senior career*
Years	Team	Apps	(Gls)
2018–2019	Torres	6	(0)
2019–2020	Apollon Smyrnis	0	(0)
2020–2021	Aittitos Spata		
2021–2022	Akritas Chlorakas		
2022–	Ifestos Peristeri		
- * Club domestic league appearances and goals as of 19:20, 8 December 2022 (UTC)

Charalampos Tsoulfas (Greek: Χαράλαμπος Τσούλφας; born 2 July 2000) is a Greek professional footballer who plays as a goalkeeper for Greek side Ifestos Peristeri.
