= Kevin Ramírez (footballer, born 1993) =

Peruvian footballer

Personal information
- Full name: Kevin John Ramírez Cuba
- Date of birth: 10 June 1993 (age 33)
- Place of birth: Lima, Peru
- Height: 1.84 m (6 ft 0 in)
- Position: Midfielder

Team information
- Current team: Sedriano

Youth career
- 2004: Sporting Cristal
- 2005: GS Nuova San Romano
- 2006: US Setimo Milanese
- 2006–2009: Milan
- 2009: → Pro Patria (loan)
- 2011–2013: Club Vittuone

Senior career*
Years	Team	Apps	(Gls)
2013–2014	AC Bareggio		
2014	Coronel Bolognesi		
2015	Sporting Cristal	0	(0)
2015	Willy Serrato	15	(3)
2016	Torres		
2016–2017	ASD Corbetta		
2017	Vedeggio Calcio		
2018	US Vighignolo		
2018–2019	Losone Sportiva		
2019	GS Castanese		
2020–	Sedriano		
- * Club domestic league appearances and goals

Kevin John Ramírez Cuba (born 10 June 1993) is a Peruvian professional footballer who plays as a midfielder for ACD Sedriano.

== Career ==
Ramírez started his youth career in his homeland with Sporting Cristal, prior to moving to Italian football with GS Nuova San Romano in 2005. A short spell in the ranks of US Setimo Milanese then followed, before the midfielder joined the system of Milan in 2006. Three years later, Ramírez was loaned to Pro Patria's academy. After a two-year stint with Club Vittuone, Ramírez began his senior career in 2013 with AC Bareggio of Promozione. 2014 saw him go back to Peru, as he signed with Copa Perú outfit Coronel Bolognesi. A return to Sporting Cristal was confirmed in early 2015, soon before a six-month stay with Willy Serrato.

For the Segunda División team, Ramírez made his professional league debut on 14 June, featuring for the full duration of a 1–0 win over Atlético Torino; picking up a yellow card in the process. Ramírez scored his first goal for Willy Serrato in August versus San Simón, which was followed by a brace against Alianza Universidad on 27 September. In total, Ramírez scored three times in fifteen games as Willy Serrato placed fourth. Ramírez went back to Italy in 2016, with Torres (Serie D) and then ASD Corbetta (Promozione) penning terms with him. A move to Swiss football, with 2. Liga team Vedeggio Calcio, arrived in 2017.

At the beginning of 2018, Ramírez had a short time back in Italy's Promozione with US Vighignolo before rejoining Switzerland's sixth tier with Losone Sportiva. Across the 2019–20 campaign, the midfielder had spells in Italy with GS Castanese (Eccellenza) and ACD Sedriano (Promozione).

== Career statistics ==
Club statistics
Club	Season	League			Cup		League Cup		Continental		Other		Total	
Club	Season	Division	Apps	Goals	Apps	Goals	Apps	Goals	Apps	Goals	Apps	Goals	Apps	Goals
Willy Serrato	2015	Segunda División	15	3	—		—		—		0	0	15	3
Career total			15	3	—		—		—		0	0	15	3
