= Giuseppe Pancaro =

Italian footballer (born 1971)

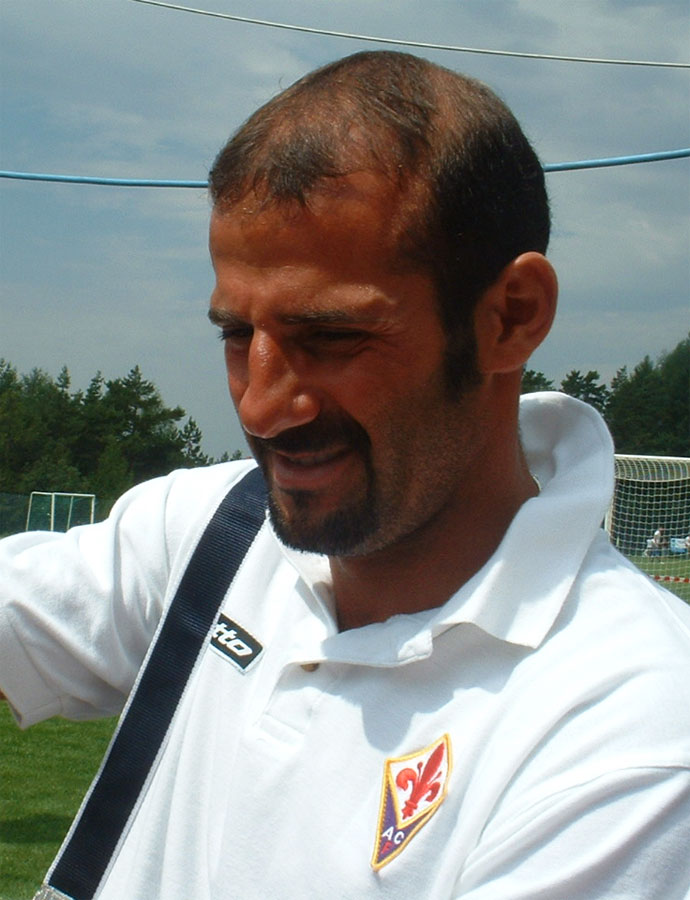
- Pancaro in 2005

Personal information
- Date of birth: 26 August 1971 (age 55)
- Place of birth: Cosenza, Italy
- Height: 1.86 m (6 ft 1 in)
- Position: Full-back

Senior career*
| Years | Team | Apps | (Gls) |
| 1988–1989 | Acri | 29 | (0) |
| 1989–1992 | Torino | 0 | (0) |
| 1991–1992 | → Avezzano (loan) | 32 | (2) |
| 1992–1997 | Cagliari | 99 | (5) |
| 1997–2003 | Lazio | 152 | (5) |
| 2003–2005 | Milan | 39 | (2) |
| 2005–2006 | Fiorentina | 18 | (0) |
| 2006–2007 | Torino | 10 | (0) |
| Total | | 379 | (14) |

International career
| 1999–2005 | Italy | 19 | (0) |

Managerial career
- 2014–2015: Juve Stabia
- 2015–2016: Catania
- 2018: Catanzaro
- 2019–2020: Pistoiese
- 2022–2023: Monopoli
- * Club domestic league appearances and goals

Giuseppe Pancaro (Italian pronunciation: [dʒuˈzɛppe ˈpaŋkaro]; born 26 August 1971) is a former Italian football defender turned coach.

== Club career ==
Born in Cosenza, Calabria, Pancaro started his youth career with Acri. He later moved to the Torino FC Youth squad remaining with the club for two seasons, before being loaned to Serie C2 club Avezzano. Pancaro made his professional debut with Cagliari Calcio, after the club's owner Massimo Cellino acquired him in 1992; although he only made 10 appearances during his first two seasons, he soon established himself as a key member of the starting line-up. In the 1993–94 UEFA Cup, Pancaro made his European debut, scoring the match winning goal in the first leg of the semi-final, after coming on as a substitute, as Cagliari beat eventual champions Inter 3–2.

After Cagliari were relegated in 1997, he transferred to SS Lazio, where he remained for six seasons, winning the 1999–2000 Serie A title, two Coppa Italia titles (1997–98 and 1999–2000), two Italian Supercups, the 1998–99 UEFA Cup Winners' Cup, and the 1999 UEFA Super Cup, also reaching the final of the UEFA Cup in 1998.

In the summer of 2003, Pancaro transferred to AC Milan in exchange for Demetrio Albertini, where he played for two seasons. His consistency and work-rate made him an important part of Milan's squad, as he won his second Serie A title, as well as an Italian Supercup, also reaching the final of the 2004–05 UEFA Champions League, notably scoring a goal in an away victory over Brescia in 2003. In 2004, he signed a one-year extension for the club.

In 2005, Pancaro moved to ACF Fiorentina on a free transfer, for two seasons, making 18 appearances, as his former Lazio teammate Giuseppe Favalli was brought in to replace him at Milan. He then moved onto Torino FC the following season, retiring at the end of the 2006–07 season, at the age of 36.

== International career ==
Pancaro was first capped for Italy in 1999, making his debut in a 0–0 draw against Croatia on 28 April. In total, he won 19 caps with the Azzurri between 1999 and 2005, but he never took part at a major tournament with Italy. Injury blocked him from playing in UEFA Euro 2004, and he was also in the provisional 26 man squad for UEFA Euro 2000 before missing the final cut.

== Style of play ==
A strong, reliable, and tenacious left-back, who was effective in the air, Pancaro was known for his stamina and work-rate, as well as his technical qualities and distribution, which allowed him to overlap and contribute both offensively and defensively. A versatile player, although he was usually deployed along the left flank, he was also capable of playing on the right. His discipline in training ensured that he was rarely injured throughout his career. In addition to his footballing abilities, he was also known for his consistency, correct behaviour, and leadership.

== Coaching career ==
Pancaro took his first coaching role in July 2012, working as assistant to Dario Marcolin at Serie B outfit Modena and leaving the club together with the whole coaching staff after the latter's dismissal in March 2013.

In June 2014, he was named new head coach of recently relegated Lega Pro club Juve Stabia.

On 16 July 2015, Pancaro was assigned new head coach of Catania.

On 6 March 2018, he was hired as the head coach of Serie C side Catanzaro. He left Catanzaro at the end of the 2017–18 season.

On 28 June 2019, he was hired by Serie C club Pistoiese. He left the club at the end of the season.

On 21 October 2022, he was announced as the new head coach of Serie C club Monopoli. He was dismissed on 19 March 2023 after a home loss to Giugliano.

== Personal life ==
On 27 June 2007, Pancaro married the Italian former show-girl Vincenza Cacace, with whom he has two children: a son Riccardo, born in December 2005, and a daughter Virginia, born in January 2009.

== Honours ==
Torino

- Mitropa Cup: 1991

Lazio

- UEFA Cup Winners' Cup: 1998–99
- UEFA Super Cup: 1999
- Coppa Italia: 1997–98, 1999–2000
- Serie A: 1999–2000; runner-up 1998–99
- Supercoppa Italiana: 1998, 2000
- UEFA Cup runner-up: 1997–98

AC Milan

- Serie A: 2003–04; runner-up: 2004–05
- Supercoppa Italiana: 2004; runner-up: 2003
- UEFA Super Cup: 2003
- UEFA Champions League runner-up: 2004–05
- Intercontinental Cup runner-up: 2003
