= ASD Cittanova Interpiana Calcio =

Italian football club

Cittanova Interpiana
- Full name: Associazione Sportiva Dilettantistica Cittanova Interpiana Calcio
- Founded: 2010
- Ground: Stadio Proto-Morreale, Cittanova, Italy
- Manager: Graziano Nocera
- League: Eccellenza Calabria
- 2011–12: Serie D/I, 18th
Home colours	Away colours

Cittanova Interpiana Calcio is an Italian association football club located in Cittanova, Calabria. It in the season 2012–13 plays in Eccellenza.

== History ==
The club was born in 2010 and merged with A.S. Rosarno (based in Rosarno, Calabria) in order to play immediately in Serie D.

In April, 2011, the club's assets were seized by authorities in a raid of suspected mafia assets. In the season 2011–12 it was relegated to Eccellenza.

== Colors and badge ==
The team's colors are green and white.
