= Andrea Zaccagno =

Italian footballer (born 1997)

Personal information
- Full name: Andrea Zaccagno
- Date of birth: 27 May 1997 (age 29)
- Place of birth: Padua, Italy
- Height: 1.89 m (6 ft 2 in)
- Position: Goalkeeper

Team information
- Current team: Torres
- Number: 12

Youth career
- –2014: Padova
- 2014–2016: Torino

Senior career*
Years	Team	Apps	(Gls)
2015–2020	Torino	0	(0)
2016–2017	→ Pro Vercelli (loan)	2	(0)
2017–2018	→ Pistoiese (loan)	31	(0)
2018–2019	→ Pro Piacenza (loan)	8	(0)
2019	→ Vibonese (loan)	11	(0)
2020	→ Virtus Entella (loan)	0	(0)
2020–2021	Cremonese	1	(0)
2022	Perugia	0	(0)
2022–2023	Rimini	28	(0)
2023–	Torres	103	(0)

International career
2012	Italy U15	2	(0)
2012	Italy U16	1	(0)
2013–2014	Italy U17	1	(0)
2014–2015	Italy U18	7	(0)
2015–2016	Italy U19	5	(0)
2017–2018	Italy U20	13	(0)
Medal record
Men's football
Representing Italy
FIFA U-20 World Cup
Third place	2017 South Korea
UEFA European Under-19 Championship
Runner-up	2016 Germany
- * Club domestic league appearances and goals as of 30 April 2026

Andrea Zaccagno (born 27 May 1997) is an Italian professional footballer who plays as a goalkeeper for Serie C Group B club Torres.

== Club career ==
Born in Padua, he began his career with Padova. In 2014, he was signed by Torino, with whom he won the Campionato Primavera and Supercoppa Primavera in 2015.

Zaccagno made his professional debut in the Serie B for Pro Vercelli on 11 February 2017 in a game against Spezia when he had to come on as a substitute in the 56th minute after Ivan Provedel was sent off.

On 31 January 2019, he joined Vibonese on loan.

On 24 January 2020, he joined Serie B club Virtus Entella on loan.

On 25 September 2020, he signed with Cremonese on a permanent basis.

On 17 February 2022, Zaccagno joined Perugia in Serie B until the end of the season.

On 12 July 2022, Zaccagno signed with Rimini.

== International career ==
With the Italy U-19 he took part as second keeper at the 2016 UEFA European Under-19 Championship, where Italy reached the final and finished as runners-up.

With the Italy U-20 he took part at the 2017 FIFA U-20 World Cup, helping the team to a third-place finish, their best ever result in the competition.

== Career statistics ==
=== Club ===
As of match played 4 January 2021

Club	League	Season	League		Cup		Europe		Other		Total	
Club	League	Season	Apps	Goals	Apps	Goals	Apps	Goals	Apps	Goals	Apps	Goals
Pro Vercelli (loan)	Serie B	2016–17	2	0	1	0	–		–		3	0
Pistoiese (loan)	Serie C	2017–18	31	0	2	0	–		0	0	33	0
Pro Piacenza (loan)	Serie C	2018–19	8	0	'	0	–		0	0	8	0
Vibonese (loan)	Serie C	2018–19	11	0	0	0	–		0	0	11	0
Virtus Entella (loan)	Serie B	2019–20	0	0	0	0	–		0	0	0	0
Cremonese	Serie B	2020–21	1	0	0	0	–		0	0	1	0
Perugia	Serie B	2021–22	0	0	0	0	–		0	0	0	0
Total			53	0	3	0	–		0	0	56	0

== Honours ==
Torino

- Campionato Primavera: 2014–15
- Supercoppa Primavera: 2015

Italy U19

- UEFA European Under-19 Championship runner-up: 2016

Italy U20

- FIFA U-20 World Cup third place: 2017
