= Francesco Corsinelli =

Italian footballer (born 1997)

Personal information
- Date of birth: 21 November 1997 (age 28)
- Place of birth: Pietrasanta, Italy
- Height: 1.80 m (5 ft 11 in)
- Position: Midfielder

Team information
- Current team: Torres
- Number: 21

Youth career
- –2016: Genoa

Senior career*
Years	Team	Apps	(Gls)
2016–2019	Genoa	0	(0)
2016–2018	→ Pontedera (loan)	59	(4)
2018–2019	→ FeralpiSalò (loan)	12	(0)
2019	Piacenza	10	(0)
2019–2021	Bari	22	(0)
2021	→ Novara (loan)	16	(1)
2021–2022	Lucchese	35	(2)
2022–2025	Gubbio	98	(5)
2025–2026	Ravenna	26	(2)
2026–	Torres	1	(0)
- * Club domestic league appearances and goals as of 24 August 2026

Francesco Corsinelli (born 21 November 1997) is an Italian footballer who plays as a midfielder for Serie C Group B club Torres.

== Club career ==
=== Genoa ===
He made his first appearance on the bench for the main squad of Geona on 20 April 2016 in a Serie A game against Inter.

==== Loan to Pontedera ====
On 9 July 2016, Corsinelli was signed by Serie C club Pontedera on a 2-season loan deal. On 31 July he made his professional debut in a 3–1 away defeat against Foggia in the first round of Coppa Italia, he played the entire match. On 28 August 2016 he made his Serie C debut for Pontedera as a substitute replacing Roberto Bonaventura in the 82nd minute of a 1–1 home draw against Robur Siena. On 14 September he played his first entire match in Serie C for Pontedera, a 1–1 away draw against Pistoiese. On 25 March 2017, Corsinelli scored his first professional goal in the 17th minute of a 1–1 away draw against Cremonese. Corsinelli ended his first season at Pontedera with 33 appearances, 1 goal and 2 assists.

Corsinelli started his second season with Pontedera on 27 August with a 1–1 home draw against Alessandria, he played the entire match. On 8 October he scored his first goal of the season in the 69th minute of a 3–0 home win over Piacenza. On 23 October he scored his second goal in the 33rd minute of a 2–2 home draw against Pistoiese. Six days later he scored his third consecutive goal in the 55th minute of a 2–1 home win over Gavorrano. Corsinelli ended his season with 28 appearances, all as a starter and 3 goals. In total he played 61 matches, scored 4 goals and made 2 assists.

==== Loan to FeralpiSalò ====
On 21 July 2018, Corsinelli was loaned to Serie C side FeralpiSalò on a season-long loan deal. On 29 July he made his debut for FeralpiSalò in a 2–0 home win over Virtus Francavilla in the first round of Coppa Italia, he was replaced after 75 minutes for Davide Mordini. Nine days later, on 7 August, he played in the second round as a substitute replacing Davide Mordini in the 91st minute of a 1–0 away defeat after extra-time against Lecce. On 7 September he played his first match for FeralpiSalò in Serie C, a 3–1 home win over Teramo, he was replaced by Andrea Ferretti in the 54th minute. In January 2019, Corsinelli was re-called to Genoa leaving FeralpiSalò with 12 appearances, only 3 as a starter, but he never played any entire match.

=== Piacenza ===
On 30 January 2019, Corsinelli moved to Piacenza for an undisclosed fee on a permanent basis. Four days later, on 3 February he made his debut for Piacenza in a 0–0 away draw against Novara, he played the entire match. Corsinelli ended his first half season to Piacenza with 14 appearances, including 13 as a starter, and 1 assist. He also helps Piacenza to reach the play-off final, however Piacenza lost 2–0 on aggregate against Trapani, he played both matches.

=== Bari ===
After only 7 month at Piacenza, on 18 July 2019, Corsinelli signed to newly promoted Serie C side Bari for an undisclosed fee and he signed a 3-year contract.

==== Loan to Novara ====
On 27 January 2021, he joined Novara on loan.

=== Gubbio ===
On 16 July 2022, Corsinelli signed a two-year contract with Gubbio.

== Career statistics ==
=== Club ===
As of match played 20 February 2022

Club	Season	League			National cup		League cup		Other		Total	
Club	Season	League	Apps	Goals	Apps	Goals	Apps	Goals	Apps	Goals	Apps	Goals
Pontedera (loan)	2016–17	Serie C	32	1	1	0	2	0	—		35	1
Pontedera (loan)	2017–18	Serie C	27	3	0	0	7	0	1 (Note: All appearance(s) in Serie C play-off.)	0	35	3
Pontedera (loan)	Club total		59	4	1	0	9	0	1	0	70	4
FeralpiSalò (loan)	2018–19	Serie C	12	0	2	0	2	0	—		16	0
Piacenza	2018–19	Serie C	10	0	—		—		4	0	14	0
Bari	2019–20	Serie C	18	0	—		1	0	—		19	0
Bari	2020–21	Serie C	4	0	2	0	—		—		6	0
Bari	Club total		22	0	2	0	1	0	0	0	25	0
Novara (loan)	2020–21	Serie C	16	1	—		—		—		16	1
Lucchese	2021–22	Serie C	25	1	—		1	0	—		26	1
Career total			144	6	5	0	13	0	5	0	167	6
