= Eccellenza Calabria =

- Organising body: Lega Nazionale Dilettanti
- Founded: 1991
- Country: Italy
- Confederation: UEFA
- Number of clubs: 16
- Promotion to: Serie D
- Relegation to: Promozione Calabria
- League cup: Coppa Italia Dilettanti
- Current champions: Vigor Lamezia (2024–25)
- Most championships: Sambiase, Rosarnese, Gioiese (3 titles)
- Website: http://www.lnd.it

Eccellenza Calabria is the regional Eccellenza football division for clubs in the Southern Italian region of Calabria, Italy. It is competed among 16 teams, in one group. The winners of the Groups are promoted to Serie D. The club who finishes second also have the chance to gain promotion, they are entered into a national play-off which consists of two rounds.

== Champions ==
Here are the past champions of the Calabria Eccellenza, organised into their respective seasons.

- 1991–92 La Sportiva Cariatese
- 1992–93 Reggio Gallina
- 1993–94 Gioiese
- 1994–95 Crotone
- 1995–96 Cirò Krimisa
- 1996–97 Rende
- 1997–98 Nuova Vibonese
- 1998–99 Juventus Siderno
- 1999–2000 Nuova Acri
- 2000–01 Rossanese
- 2001–02 Rosarnese
- 2002–03 Rende
- 2003–04 Nuova Rossanese
- 2004–05 Villese
- 2005–06 Paolana
- 2006–07 Rosarno
- 2007–08 HinterReggio
- 2008–09 Sambiase
- 2009–10 Omega Bagaladi
- 2010–11 Acri
- 2011–12 Montalto Uffugo
- 2012–13 Gioiese
- 2013–14 Roccella
- 2014–15 Palmese
- 2015–16 Sersale
- 2016–17 Isola Capo Rizzuto
- 2017–18 Locri
- 2018–19 Corigliano
- 2019–20 San Luca
- 2020–21 Sambiase
- 2021–22 Locri
- 2022–23 Gioiese
- 2023–24 Sambiase
- 2024–25 Vigor Lamezia
