= Denis Dasoul =

Belgian footballer

Personal information
- Full name: Denis André Dasoul
- Date of birth: 20 July 1983
- Place of birth: Belgium
- Date of death: 4 November 2017 (aged 34)
- Place of death: Indonesia
- Positions: Defender; midfielder

Senior career*
Years	Team	Apps	(Gls)
-2001	Standard Liège	0	(0)
2001–2002	A.C. Perugia Calcio	0	(0)
2002–2003	K.R.C. Genk	0	(0)
2003–2005	SC Bregenz	26	(0)
2005	Royal Antwerp F.C.		
2005–2006	Calcio Foggia 1920 S.S.D.	21	(0)
2006/2007	C.S. Visé		
2007–2008	A.C. Este	21	(0)
2008–2009	F.C. Bolzano 1996	29	(3)
2009–2010	U.S. Città di Jesolo	19	(0)
2010–2011	S.E.F. Torres 1903	9	(0)
2015–2016	Caroline Springs George Cross FC	13	(0)
2016	Werribee City FC	3	(0)
- * Club domestic league appearances and goals

Denis Dasoul was born 20 July 1983 in Belgium, and died 4 November 2017 in Indonesia. Denis was a Belgian footballer, who had spells with Standard Liege, Genk, and Antwerp; he also captained Belgium at youth level. He retired in 2011, and moved to Melbourne with his girlfriend, Pellaers Allison.

Denis died in 2017, after being struck by lightning as he learnt how to surf in Bali, Indonesia
