= FC Calcio Acri =

Italian football club

Acri
- Full name: Associazione Sportiva Dilettantistica Virtus Acri
- Nickname: Lupi
- Founded: 1949; 77 years ago as, Società Sportiva Acri; 1993; 33 years ago as, Società Sportiva New Acri (refounded); 2004; 22 years ago as, FC Football Acri (refounded); 2014; 12 years ago as, Football Club Calcio Acri Società Cooperativa Sportiva Dilettantistica; 2020; 6 years ago as, Associazione Sportiva Dilettantistica Città di Acri 2020 (refounded); 2025; 1 year ago as, Associazione Sportiva Dilettantistica Virtus Acri (takeover)
- Ground: Stadio Pasquale Castrovillari, Acri, Italy
- Capacity: 4,000
- Chairman: Alessandro De Rose
- Manager: Mario Pascuzzo
- League: Prima Categoria
- 2011–12: Serie D/I, 13th (relegated after play-off)
- Website: www.fccalcioacri.it
Home colours	Away colours

Associazione Sportiva Dilettantistica Virtus Acri or simply Acri is an Italian association football club, based in Acri, Calabria. It currently plays in Prima Categoria.

== History ==
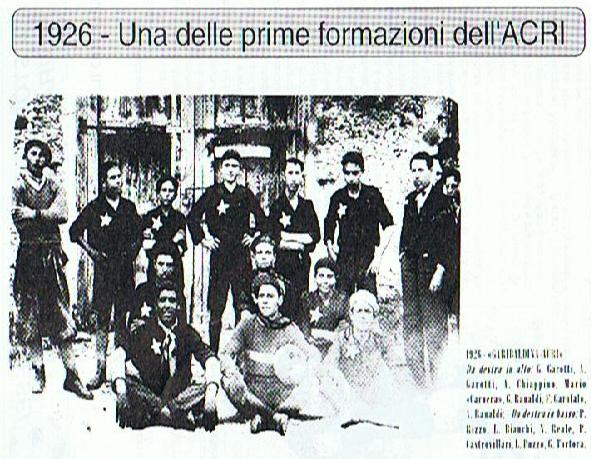
Garibaldina Acri in 1926.

The first traces of the football in Acri goes back to 1926. The 23 September 1949 is the date of foundation. the same year of foundation coincides with the conquest of first title, the group a of the first division, after winning the play-off against Silana for 2–1. From 1974 to 1985 the S.S. Acri participated in the highest Calabrian championship, the Promozione. In 1984–1985 Acri got the first promotion in the Interregional Championship, category where it remained for eight years losing the Serie C2 in Interregional Championship 1986–1987, when it arrived to the second place at one point behind the leader Kroton.

After the relegation occurred in 1993, the S.S. Acri was replaced by S.S. New Acri in the following years. New Acri won the Promozione championship (1998–1999) and Eccellenza championship (1999–2000) and a Calabria Supercup (1999–2000), and participated for two years at Series D from 2000 to 2002.

With the failure of the S.S. New Acri, the football reborn in 2004 when F.C. Football Acri was refounded . In 2010–2011 Acri won Eccellenza championship and the second Calabria Supercup, and it was promoted in Serie D. In Serie D championship 2011–2012, after a first half of championship played at the top, the team collapsed in the second half of championship ending the season at 13th place and it was relegated to Eccellenza after losing the play-out against Nissa. In the same year the national television (RAI) transmitted the championship match Acri-Marsala on channel Rai Sport 1.

Calabria Cup 2015

Lamezia Terme, 4 january 2015.
Acri – Cittanovese
1-0

Scorers: 11' Feraco (A)

In the season 2014–2015 the F.C. Football Acri won the Calabria Cup beating Cittanovese for 1 to 0 in the final played in Lamezia Terme on 4 January 2015. In the national phase of the competition Acri won the second round beating Marsala, but in the quarter of finals the Rossoneri were eliminated by Virtus Francavilla.

== Chronological history ==
Football Club Calcio Acri Società Cooperativa Sportiva Dilettantistica Chronological History
1949 – Foundation of Societa Sportiva Acri.; 1949–1950 – 1 in Prima Divisione. – Winner of First Division; 1953–1954 – ? in Prima Divisione; 1954–1955 – ? in Prima Divisione.; 1955–1956 – 13° in Promozione; 1956–1957 – 11° in Promozione; 1957–1958 – 9° in Promozione; 1958–1959 – It retires from Promozione; 1959–1960 – 5° in Seconda Categoria.; 1960–1961 – ? in Seconda Categoria.; 1961–1962 – ? in Seconda Categoria.; 1962–1963 – ? in Seconda Categoria.; 1963–1964 – ? in Seconda Categoria.; 1964–1965 – ? in Seconda Categoria.; 1965–1966 – 1° in Seconda Categoria – Promoted in Prima Categoria; 1966–1967 – 11° in Prima Categoria.; 1967–1968 – 9° in Prima Categoria.; 1968–1969 – 7° in Prima Categoria.; 1969–1970 – 13° in Prima Categoria.; 1970–1971 – 12° in Prima Categoria.; 1971–1972 – 5° in Prima Categoria.; 1972–1973 – 3° in Prima Categoria.; 1973–1974 – 1° in Prima Categoria – Promoted in Promozione.; 1974–1975 – 9° in Promozione.; 1975–1976 – 4° in Promozione.; 1976–1977 – 7° in Promozione.; 1977–1978 – 13° in Promozione.; 1978–1979 – 9° in Promozione.; 1979–1980 – 10° in Promozione.; 1980–1981 – 13° in Promozione.; 1981–1982 – 4° in Promozione.; 1982–1983 – 6° in Promozione.; 1983–1984 – 3° in Promozione.; 1984–1985 – 2° in Promozione – Promoted in Interregionale.; 1985–1986 – 7° in group L of Interregionale.; 1986–1987 – 2° in group L of Interregionale.; 1987–1988 – 6° in group L of Interregionale.; 1988–1989 – 4° in group L of Interregionale.; 1989–1990 – 14°in group M of Interregionale.; 1990–1991 – 3° in group M of Interregionale.; 1991–1992 – 8° in group L of Interregionale.; 1992–1993 – 16°in group I of Campionato Nazionale Dilettanti. It retires from Serie D; 1996–1997 – 3° in Promozione.; 1997–1998 – 4° in Promozione.; 1998–1999 – 1° in Promozione – Promoted in Eccellenza.; 1999–2000 – 1° in Eccellenza – Promoted in Serie D -It wins Calabria Supercup (1º title).; 2000–2001 – 4° in group I of Serie D.; 2001–2002 – 18°in group I of Serie D. It retires from Serie D.; 2004–2005 – 6° in Promozione.; 2005–2006 – 1° in Promozione – Promoted in Eccellenza.; 2006–2007 – 3° in Eccellenza.; 2007–2008 – 13° in Eccellenza.; 2008–2009 – 8° in Eccellenza.; 2009–2010 – 3° in Eccellenza.; 2010–2011 – 1° in Eccellenza – Promoted in Serie D -It wins Calabria Supercup (2º title).; 2011–2012 – 13° in group I of Serie D; It loses the play-out against Nissa. It downgrades in Eccellenza.; 2012–2013 – 5º in Eccellenza.; 2013–2014 – 10º in Eccellenza.; 2014–2015 – 5º in Eccellenza -It wins Calabria Cup (1º title).; 2015–2016 – 10º in Eccellenza.; 2016–2017 – 5º in Eccellenza.; 2017-2018 - 5º in Eccellenza; 2018-2019 - 14º in Eccellenza.; 2019-2020 - 4º in Promozione.; 2020-2021 - 3º in Promozione. Promoted in Eccellenza.; 2021-2022 - 5º in Eccellenza.; 2022-2023 - 16º in Eccellenza.

== Staff Members ==
Staff Members updated 12-4-2017.

Presidents

- (Italy) Zanfini Salvatore
- (Italy) Dodaro Annunziato
- (Italy) Scaramuzzo F.V.
- (Italy) Siciliano Luca
- (Italy) Torchiaro Michele
- (Italy) Pavano Maurizio Andrea
- (Italy) Nigro Riccardo
- (Italy) Straface Cosimo
- (Italy) Siciliano Alessandro
- (Italy) Vita Giovanni
- (Italy) Siciliano Paolo
- (Italy) Maiorano Gino
- (Italy) Velluzzi Luca
- (Italy) Conforti Mario
- (Italy) Molinari Angelo
- (Italy) Ferraro Angelo
- (Italy) Falcone Santo
- (Italy) Molinari Leonardo
- (Italy) De Rose Alessandro
- (Italy) Ferraro Danilo
- (Italy) Reda Alessandro
- (Italy) Falcone Santo

Other Staff

- (Italy) Vita Giovanni
- (Italy) Castrovillari Alfonso
- (Italy) Altomari Gennaro
- (Italy) Ferraro Angelo
- (Italy) Viteritti Cosimo
- (Italy) Tripoli Gianni
- (Italy) Belsito Claudio
- (Italy) Azzinnari Osvaldo
- (Italy) Fusaro Vincenzo
- (Italy) Covello Salvatore
- (Italy) Ferraro Enzo
- (Italy) Aiello Filippo
- (Italy) Falcone Angelo
- (Italy) Julia Gianluca
- (Italy) Capalbo Pino
- (Italy) Cozzolino Giacomo
- (Italy) Castrovillari Pierino
- (Italy) Cofone Angelo
- (Italy) Montalto Emilio
- (Italy) Siciliano Alessandro
- (Italy) Siciliano Giuseppe
- (Italy) Fusaro Luigi

== Colors and badge ==
The team's color are black and red. The team's symbol is a wolf.

== Stadium ==
Acri plays its home matches at Stadio Pasquale Castrovillari, a small stadium located north of the city in natural grass.

The stadium is divided into three sectors: the grandstand, or tribuna centrale, with a capacity of 2,200, where the home and organized supporters sit down; the visitors grandstand, situated in front of the tribuna centrale, with a capacity of 1,000; and the curva (although it is not really a curved sector), usually closed.

South down the stadium, there is also a ground training field.

== Notable players ==
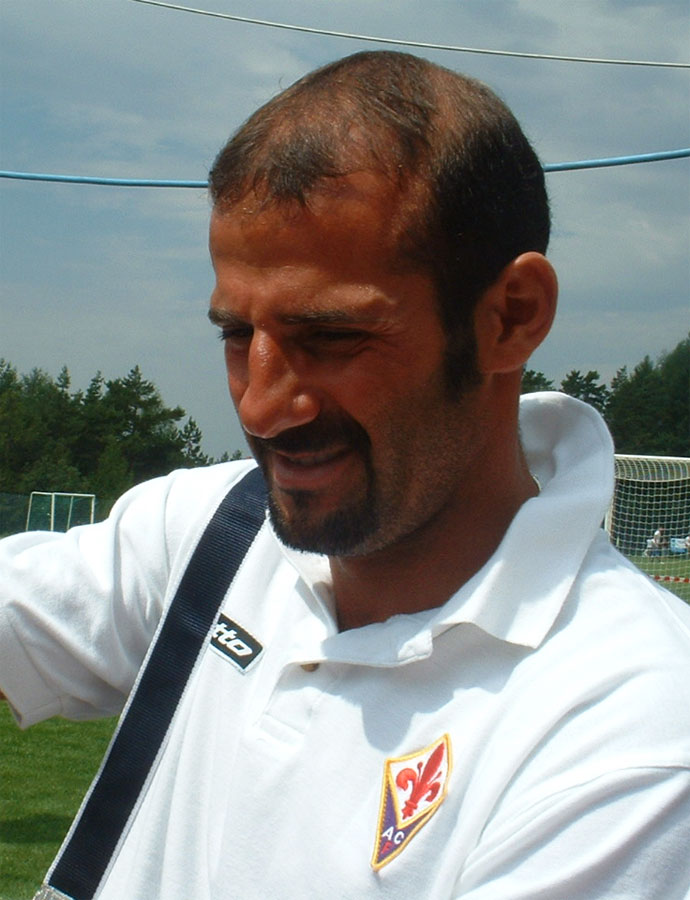
Giuseppe Pancaro in the 2005.

- (Italy) Nicola Fusaro player in the 1970s for Catania, Brindisi, Varese.
- (Italy) Pasquale Lo Giudice Interregionale player in the 1990s for Crotone, Siena, Cosenza, Catanzaro, Palermo,
- (Italy) Giuseppe Pancaro Interregionale player in the 1990s and 2000s for Cagliari, Lazio, Milan, ACF Fiorentina, Torino FC and Italia.
- (Croatia) Dragutin Ristić Interregionale player in the 1980s and 1990s for Partizan, Dundee, Falkirk, Dundee United.
- (Italy) Orlando Viteritti player in the 2010s for Foggia, Potenza, and today Monopoli.

== Titles ==
=== Regional Championships ===
- Eccellenza:2

1999–2000
2010–2011

- Promozione:1

1984–85

- Prima Divisione:1

1949–1950

=== Cups ===
- Coppa Italia Dilettanti Calabria: 1

2014–2015

- Supercoppa Calabria: 2

1999–2000
2010–2011

== Statistics ==
=== Presences in championships ===
National Championships

Level	Category	Presences	Debut	Last season	Total
5°	Serie D	11	1985–1986	2011–2012	11

Regional Championships

Level	Category	Presences	Debut	Last season	Total
1°	Prima Divisione	1	1949–1950	1949–1950	35
1°	Prima Categoria	4	1966–1967	1969–1970	35
1°	Promozione	15	1955–1956	1984–1985	35
1°	Eccellenza	15	1999–2000	2022–2023	35

=== Team statistics ===
Team final position in the championships:

Legenda: Serie D. Maximum Regional Level.

== Fans ==
=== History ===
The first Organized groups are the "Commandos Club Acri," born in 1973 and "Erotik Club ", also founded in the seventies. In 1985 Rossonere Brigades were founded. Now ultras groups are The" GRUA "born in nineties and '" Alkool Group ".

=== Friendship and rivalry ===
The Acri fans have good relationships with Corigliano, Trebisacce, Sambiase, Locri, Cosenza, and Marsala. More rivalries instead on with Castrovillari and Paolana.
