= ASD Sambiase 1962 =

Italian football club

ASD Sambiase 2023
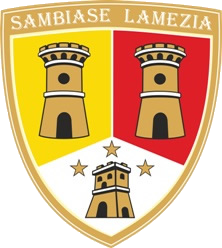
- Full name: ASD Sambiase 2023
- Founded: 1923
- Stadium: Stadio Gianni Renda, Lamezia Terme, Italy
- Capacity: 1500
- Chairman: Folino Raso Angelo
- Manager: Claudio Morelli
- League: Serie D
- 2016–17: 7th
| Home colours | Away colours |

A.S.D. Sambiase 2023 is an Italian association football club based in Lamezia Terme, Calabria.

== History ==
The club has its origins in the former municipality of Sambiase, that was merged with the neighboring municipalities of Nicastro and Eufemia to create Lamezia Terme in 1968. The club, founded in 1923, made its debut in Prima Divisione Calabria in the 1948–49 season.

In 1952, the club was excluded from all the championships after a riot following the result of a match with Oppido Mamertina.

In 1962, the club was reformed with the denomination S.C. Sambiase. Following the refounding, the club had a series of season with mixed results, until promotion in Serie D under the leadership of Presidents Costabile and Misuraca and Thomas De Pietri and Marcello Pasquino: this spell lasted from 1984 to 1989.

The club returned in Serie D in 2009, finishing 10th in the 2009–10 season, 4th in the 2010–11 one, and 10th in the 2011–12 one. In the 2020-21 season finishing 1st and winning the Eccellenza Calabria championship with manager Danilo Fanello. That after the team managed to win the title, it was taken from them by a rival club, FC Lamezia Terme (born between the union of the two rival teams Sambiase and Vigor Lamezia), dissolved on 2 November 2023, and by there the team started from the third category.

Having risen to the second category there was an exchange of titles between two of the three teams of the city Promosport having the title of Excellence and Sambiase that of Second category, and so Sambiase returned to excellence. In the 2023-24 season, he fights to go to Serie D under coach Morelli.

== Staff 2024-25 ==
| Position | Name |
|---|---|
| Head Coach | Claudio Morelli |
| Assistant Coach | Alessandro Imbrogno |
| Athletic Trainer | Ilario D'Agostino |
| Goalkeeper Coach | Gianluca Caravella |
| General manager | Antonio Mazzei |
| Sport Manager | Gennaro Porpora |

== Honours ==
ASD Sambiase 1923

- Eccellenza Calabria: 2020–21
- Eccellenza Calabria: 2023–24
