= Rossanese ASD =

Italian football club

- Full name: Rossanese Associazione Sportiva Dilettantistica
- Founded: 1909
- Ground: Stadio Stefano Rizzo, Rossano, Italy
- Capacity: 6,000
- Chairman: Cataldo Carrozza; Alfonso Bruno Guerriero
- Manager: Marco Colle
- League: Eccellenza Calabria
- 2010–11: Serie D/I, 17th (relegated)
Home colours	Away colours

Rossanese is an Italian association football club, based in Rossano, Calabria.

The club was founded in 1909.

Rossanese in the season 2010–11, from Serie D group I relegated, in the play-out, to Eccellenza Calabria, where it plays in the current season.

The team's colors are red and blue.
