= Giacomo Zecca =

Italian footballer

Personal information
- Date of birth: 6 July 1997 (age 29)
- Place of birth: Piacenza, Italy
- Height: 1.85 m (6 ft 1 in)
- Position: Forward

Team information
- Current team: Torres
- Number: 77

Youth career
- Perugia
- –2015: Piacenza
- 2014–2015: → Parma (loan)
- 2015–2017: Sassuolo

Senior career*
| Years | Team | Apps | (Gls) |
| 2016–2019 | Sassuolo | 0 | (0) |
| 2017 | → Cremonese (loan) | 0 | (0) |
| 2017–2018 | → Piacenza (loan) | 17 | (1) |
| 2018–2019 | → Teramo (loan) | 30 | (1) |
| 2019–2023 | Cesena | 78 | (4) |
| 2020 | → Padova (loan) | 3 | (0) |
| 2023– | Torres | 84 | (9) |
- * Club domestic league appearances and goals as of 30 April 2026

Giacomo Zecca (born 6 July 1997) is an Italian professional footballer who plays as a forward for Serie C Group B club Torres.

== Club career ==
He made his Serie C debut for Piacenza on 3 September 2017 in a game against Cuneo.

On 1 September 2019, he signed a 3-year contract with Cesena. On 31 January 2020, he was loaned to Padova with an option to purchase.
