= Luca Simeoni =

Italian footballer

Personal information
- Date of birth: 8 September 1990 (age 36)
- Place of birth: La Spezia, Italy
- Height: 1.89 m (6 ft 2 in)
- Positions: Second striker; midfielder

Team information
- Current team: Lavagnese

Youth career
- –2009: Spezia

Senior career*
Years	Team	Apps	(Gls)
2009–2011	Livorno	2	(0)
2010–2011	→ Pergolettese (loan)	20	(3)
2011	Alessandria	7	(1)
2011	Livorno	0	(0)
2012–2013	Virtus Entella	7	(0)
2013–2014	Olbia	24	(1)
2014–2016	RapalloBogliasco	59	(7)
2015–2016	OltrepòVoghera	33	(6)
2016	Essendon Royals		
2016–2017	US Fezzanese	14	(2)
2017–2026	Pianese	296	(18)
2026–	Lavagnese		
- * Club domestic league appearances and goals as of 30 April 2026

Luca Simeoni (born 8 September 1990) is an Italian professional footballer who plays for Eccellenza club Lavagnese.

== Career ==
Simeoni made his Serie A debut for Livorno on 17 April 2010, in the game against Chievo when he came on as a substitute in the 79th minute for Martin Bergvold.

On 12 August 2010, Simeoni moved on loan to Pergocrema in Lega Pro Prima Divisione. He spent the entire 2010–2011 season with Pergocrema scoring three goals in 20 appearances. After the season, he returned to Livorno.

On 28 July 2011, Simeoni was sold on a co-ownership deal to Lega Pro Seconda Divisione outfit Alessandria. He was bought back by Livorno on 31 January 2012, the last day of the transfer window. Livorno then sold him again on a co-ownership deal to Virtus Entella in Lega Pro Seconda Divisione.
