= SEF Torres 1903 =

Italian football club

Torres
- Full name: Società per l'Educazione Fisica Torres
- Nickname: I Rossoblù (The Red-and-Blues)
- Founded: 19 April 1903; 123 years ago
- Ground: Stadio Vanni Sanna
- Capacity: 6.145
- Owner: Abinsula
- Chairman: Stefano Udassi
- Manager: Alfonso Greco
- League: Serie C Group B
- 2025–26: Serie C Group B, 17th of 20
- Website: seftorrescalcio.it
Home colours	Away colours	Third colours

Società per l'Educazione Fisica Torres 1903 is an Italian football club based in the city of Sassari, Sardinia, that plays in Serie C, the third division of the Italian football league system.

Re-founded in 2017, the club is the continuation of the Società per l'Educazione Fisica Torres, born in 1903 and reconstituted thrice throughout its history. Together with Ilvamaddalena, it is the oldest football club in Sardinia.

The highest division it took part in was the third tier. It played thirty seasons, making Sassari the most populous city in Italy that has never had a team in Serie B. Its best result in the third tier is the third place, while it has won Serie C2 twice, in 1986-1987 and 1999–2000.

The club colours are red and blue. It plays its home matches at the Stadio Vanni Sanna.

== History ==
=== Beginnings ===
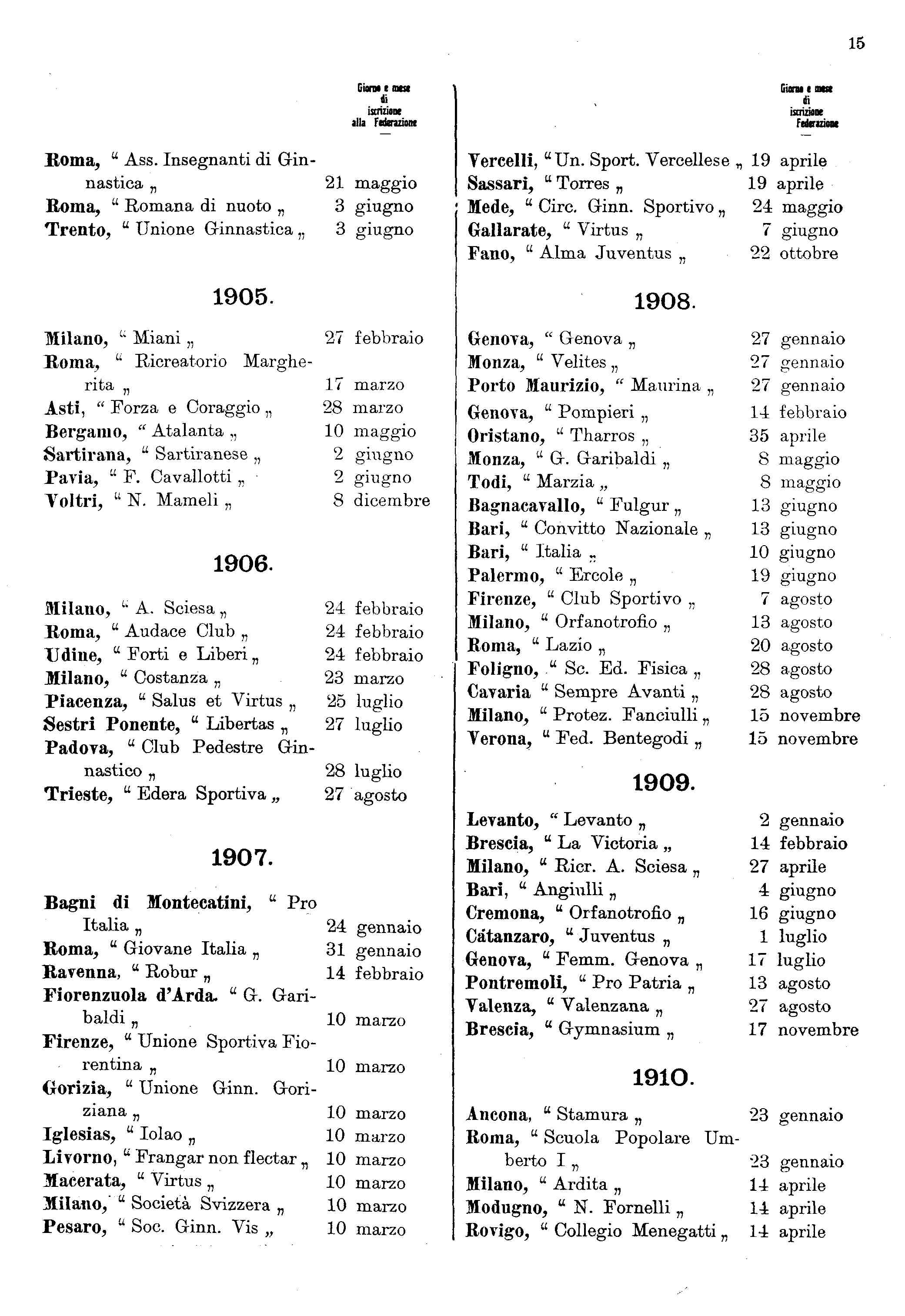
List of clubs affiliated to the F.G.N.I. Torres appears in the section referring to 19 April 1907

Torres was founded on 19 April 1903 as Società per l'Educazione Fisica Torres (Torres Physical Education Society) and starts its sporting activity the 1 July. On 20 September 1903, the Torres players made their public debut with a gymnastic recital held in the Verdi Theatre in Sassari. The club soon distinguished itself as one of the most active at the regional level in various disciplines, achieving outstanding results even at a national level. The first away game played by Torres dates back to 19 April 1908 when the rossoblù faced in Ajaccio the local team, a game played in Piazza Diamante. As for football, after eight years of amateur activity, a special section was founded in 1911. Torres won the first edition of the Sardinian football championships the same year. In addition to Torres, two other teams from Sassari, Iosto and Club Sportivo, and one from Cagliari, Amsicora, participated in the championship. At La Maddalena, in the summer of 1912, Torres won the Coppa Città della Maddalena, first beating Ilva 7-0 and, in the final, the Marina 3–1. The inter-war period was a phase of little sporting activity, which resumed with more continuity in the 1920s.

=== The 1920s and 1930s: First local derbies and the first promotion ===
On 8 September 1920, Sardinia's two leading clubs played in Cagliari at the Stallaggio Meloni. Surprisingly, Cagliari won 5–2. On 27 May 1922, in the presence of Prince Umberto di Savoia, the Stadio Acquedotto, still the stadium of Torres, was inaugurated. On 4 November 1924, another historic derby was played for the first time, that between Torres and the then Terranovese to celebrate the 21st anniversary of Torres. The Sassaresi won 2-1 The game between Olbia and Torres, known as the Derby del Nord Sardegna, is the most played derby on the island, with more than 100 matches. It is a fierce rivalry between both fans. After the first few years of friendly activity, they entered the Terza Divisione in 1927–1928, finishing runners-up behind Cagliari and ahead of Monteponi Iglesias and Avanguardia Giovanile Fascista of Cagliari.

In the 1930–1931 season, Torres participated in a regional championship (with the Lazio Regional Directorate because the Sardinian one could not organise it), resulting in a promotion to the Prima Divisione (the third tier at the time). In the 1931-1932 championship, the Sassaresi, led by the Hungarian Ferenc Plemich, came close to promotion to Serie B.

The following season was less positive, with Torres finishing second to last and relegated, but still being readmitted to the third tier. In 1934-35 it finished mid-table but renounced to play the next championship and played friendly matches until 1939. In 1939-40 they finished fifth in the Sardinian First Division, which corresponded to the fourth national level.

=== Post Second World War period ===
In the first part of the 1940s, Torres played in the Sardinian First Division without great results; the best position was third place in 1942–43. Due to the war, the championships were suspended the following year until 1944–45. In 1946–47, despite finishing fourth, the club was admitted to Serie C. A friendly against Juventus was played to celebrate this event on 5 June 1947 at the Stadio Acquedotto, with Juventus winning 3–1. The following season, however, the team was relegated back to the First Division, almost missing out on promotion in 1949–50. They won the group A but finished only third in the final round.

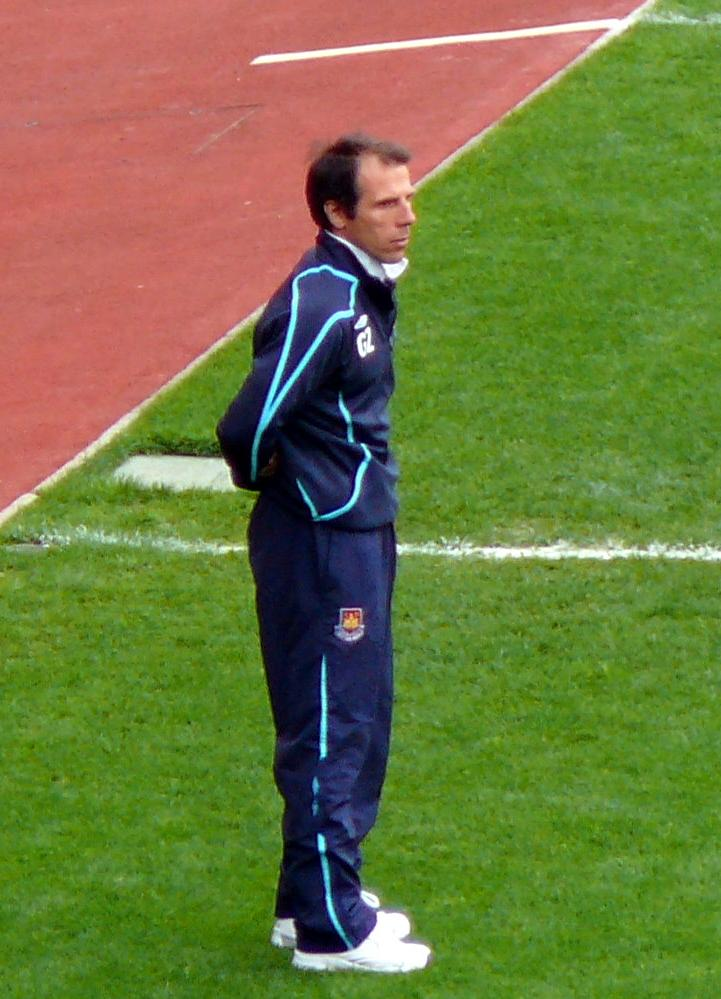
Gianfranco Zola played for Torres in the 1980s.

In 1950-51 Torres won the Sardinian First Division and entered the newly formed fourth division. It remained until 1958-59 when it won the championship and was promoted to the Serie C. In the third national division, it disputes mid-table championships but was awarded the CONI Stella d'oro al merito sportivo (Golden Star for sporting merit). It was relegated again in 1970–71 to Serie D but returned to the third division in 1971–72. It was relegated again in 1974–75. In 1980-81 they won another Serie D championship, being promoted to the newly formed Serie C2, corresponding to the fourth level. In 1982 it changed its name to Torres Calcio s.r.l. Dragged along by the experience of Mario Piga, back in the red and blue after a brilliant career at the highest level, and the rising star Gianfranco Zola, in 1986–87, the club, coached by Lamberto Leonardi, won the championship and gained promotion to Serie C1. This was the standard formation: Pinna, Tamponi, Poggi, Petrella, Cariola, Del Favero, Tolu, Zola, Galli, Piga, Ennis. At the end of the following season, they finished ahead of rivals Cagliari. At the same time, in the 1988–1989 season, Torres reached the fourth-place finish just a step away from Serie B, behind rivals Cagliari (winners of the tournament), Foggia and Palermo.

=== The first bankruptcy and the rebirth ===
In 1990–1991, following relegation on the field to Serie C2, came exclusion for financial defaults. In the 1991–1992 season, the club entered the interregional championship. Under the presidency of Corrado Sanna, Torres finished 5th and won the Coppa Italia Dilettanti (interregional phase). In the summer of 1992, the club was re-founded, retaining the sporting title and the interregional category but changing its name to Polisportiva Sassari Torres. In 1992-1993 Torres, taken over by the building entrepreneur Gianni Marrosu and coached by Giuseppe 'Eppe' Zolo, immediately achieved a return to the professional ranks, thanks to a 2–1 victory (goals by Antonio Podda and Renato Greco) in the play-off against L'Aquila, played at the Stadio Flaminio in Rome in front of over three thousand torresini fans.

After many Serie C2 championships and some unsuccessful attempts at corporate changeovers, in the 1999–2000 season, Torres was bought by a group of businessmen from Sassari, who entrusted the presidency to Leonardo Marras. The team, led again by Leonardi, regained promotion to Serie C1, thanks also to the goals of former Panionios Greek forward Theofilos Karasavvidīs, who scored 19 goals in 32 matches. In the 2000–2001 season in Serie C1, Torres had a good championship as newly promoted, placing 7th. Among the most important results, it is necessary to remember the 3–0 home victories against Catania and Palermo and 2–0 against Messina.

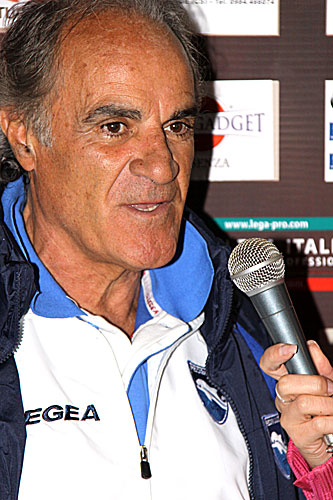
Antonello Cuccureddu in 2009

Initially excluded from the 2005-2006 championship, the club gained registration thanks to an order of the administrative judge and, led by Antonello Cuccureddu, managed to reach the playoffs for promotion to Serie B. On 16 May 2006, Torres was involuntarily involved in the Calciopoli investigation when telephone interceptions were published between the then Minister of the Interior, Beppe Pisanu and the Juventus manager Luciano Moggi. The team suffered the backlash, being defeated in the semifinals in the double-header by Grosseto, losing both games 1–0.

=== Exclusions in 2006 and 2008 ===
The defeat was followed by exclusion from the championship due to the club's serious financial collapse because of debts accrued under the management of president Rinaldo Carta. In the 2006-2007 championship, with the new name of Sassari Torres 1903 and under the presidency of Sassari entrepreneur Antonio Mascia, the club obtained admission to Serie C2 in extremis, thanks to the Lodo Petrucci. The team, built in just a few weeks during the summer, struggled due to poor pre-season preparation and the club's inexperience. The tournament fell short of expectations, alternating good play and victories with discouraging results. In fact, in April, the coach Maurizio Costantini was exonerated. However, the team won salvation and avoided the play-outs. In the 2007–2008 season, still in the Serie C2 group A, under the guidance of Luciano Foschi, Torres played a first leg that ended at the top of the league table and with a record sequence of nine consecutive home victories. However, a crisis of results and an eight-point penalty for administrative irregularities during the failed Mascia management plunged the team into the play-out zone, but the team avoided relegation.

In the summer of 2008, the federal control bodies ordered the club's exclusion from Serie C2 again for financial reasons. The appeal to the Lazio Regional Administrative Court against this decision was rejected, as was the request to the Council of State on 27 August. Torres was condemned to exclusion from the professional championships and thus restarted from the Sardinian Promozione championship with a new club chaired by Leonardo Marras, former president in 1999 and patron of Torres Femminile. Former red-blue bomber Roberto Ennas has been chosen as a manager. Amarcord of the eighties, also in the club's name: Torres Calcio.

After winning the 2008-2009 Sardinian Promozione (second tier), under the direction of Roberto Ennas, Torres gained promotion to Eccellenza.

On 27 September 2010, the club exonerated the coach for the bad results at the beginning of the season. It appointed a new coach Angelino Fiori. On 17 January 2011, the club dismissed Fiori; Ennas returned to the team's bench the next day. On 27 February 2011, after the 3–1 defeat suffered in Tortolì, Ennas resigned from the post. The club was then assigned to Guglielmo Bacci, who finished runners-up in the standings and participated in the playoffs as the top seed. After winning the regional phase, they entered the national playoff phase. In the semi-final of the national stage of the playoffs for promotion to Serie D, Torres met the Umbrian club of Trestina, from which it was eliminated.

The following season was triumphant, winning all the titles with record numbers (28 wins out of 34 matches played, 12 consecutive victories, 28 consecutive results without losing, 17 wins out of 17 games played at home). On 25 January 2012 came the first trophy, the Sardinian Cup, with a 2–1 victory over Taloro Gavoi, defending champions of the 2011 trophy. On 18 March 2012, beating Calangianus 1–0, the Torres returned to Serie D mathematically four days in advance. Finally, on 20 May 2012, the rossoblù closed the season by winning the Sardinian Supercup, imposing 2–1 on Fonni.

During the following summer, the club was largely renewed with good elements from different clubs on the island. To the general surprise, it was at the top of the Serie D championship standings for almost the entire season. The team's top scorer is Giuseppe Meloni, a striker from Nuoro with experience in Lega Pro, who scores a total of 21 goals. On 28 April 2013, drawing 4–4 with Hyria Nola and Casertana losing to Torre Neapolis, he returned to the Second Division.

In June, President Lorenzoni denounced that registration for the Lega Pro Seconda Divisione was at risk, due to difficulties in obtaining the necessary bank guarantee, and subsequently resigned. A committee of fans announced Operation Fundraising whose guarantor was the lawyer Umberto Carboni from Sassari, who is in charge of collecting and guarding the money received. The operation was successful, and around €110,000 was raised in a week. On 27 June, Torres shares officially passed into the hands of Lazio entrepreneur Domenico Capitani. He became the new owner of the Sassari club. He is joined by the new Sardinian partner Antonio Filippo Salaris. The 2013-14 Lega Pro Seconda Divisione started disastrously. For this reason, and also due to the fans' protest, the club exonerated coach Salvo Fulvio D'Adderio. Lazio's Marco Cari replaced him. The team was completely renewed during the winter market and placed 12th, which still ensured participation in the play-outs. In the double-header against Forlì they won 1–0 in the first leg but lost 3–0 in the return match in Romagna. On 25 May 2014 Torres was relegated in Serie D, however, on 1 August 2014, the club was readmitted in the new Lega Pro.

In the 2014–2015 season the club incorporated A.S.D. Torres (the city's women's team), one of the most important Italian female clubs with 7 Scudetti, 8 Coppe Italia and 7 Italian Super Cups in its palmarès, before it was excluded from the championship for financial defaults, and reborn the following season with a separate entity from the men's team. In the Lega Pro Torres avoided relegation on the field with two days to go before the end of the championship. Still, on 29 August 2015 the FIGC's Corte d'Appello Federale relegated it to Serie D for sports offences.

In the 2015-16 Serie D Torres reached the play-offs. In the semifinals it draws 1–1 in extra time with Rieti. It enters the final by the best placement in the standings at the end of the league (3rd). On 29 May 2016, they lost at home 0–1 against Olbia in the play-off final for the repechage to Lega Pro.

In the 2016–2017 season, the financial situation was problematic. However, the entry of Salvatore Sechi in the club, with the new sports director Vittorio Tossi, completely renewed the team to try to save the category. Still, despite all the efforts, the Sassaresi relegated to the top regional division. Due to huge financial problems, the club was put into liquidation and went bankrupt. The club did not enter the Sardinia.

=== The fourth re-foundation and the ascent to Serie C ===
The new president Salvatore Sechi tried to relaunch the Sassari sporting legacy by taking the reins of the Tergu Plubium, a team of excellence born from the merger of the towns of Tergu and Ploaghe. In the presentation of the new club, the new logo was unveiled, identical to the previous one but with the wording Torres Calcio. Still, federal regulations prohibited the transfer of the sport's title due to the previous merger between the two teams from the province of Sassari and the sporting offences of the old S.E.F. Torres. The legacy of S.E.F. is therefore continued by Sechi with the former Tergu Plubium, even though that club does not possess the sporting title of the predecessor Torres club. On 2 August 2017 came the confirmation of the change of name of the A.S.D. F.C. Tergu Plubium to A.S.D. Torres, with the consequent relocation of the playing field for home matches to the Stadio Vanni Sanna, with consequent dispensation from the FIGC as it is not located in the territory of the municipality of Tergu. Consequently, the club's social colours also changed from white-blue to Torresino red-blue. The new club finished third, followed by the victory in the regional playoffs with consequent admission to the national disputes for promotion to Serie D, which are won, ensuring the team promotion. The management Sechi provides stability but is fluctuating in terms of results: in the first season, the team avoided relegation only at the play-out in the derby with Castiadas, while the following year, after a good championship, interrupted only by the pandemic of COVID-19, it finished third. In 2020–2021, the team started among the favourites. Still, the performances are mediocre, and the team only manages to save the category at best.

The turning point came in the summer of 2021 when the Sardinian company Abinsula Srl bought the club. The new president became the former flagman of the 1990s, Stefano Udassi, who immediately set up a team to return to Serie C. The expectations are confirmed, and only Giugliano denies the conquest of direct promotion. Even in the Coppa Italia Dilettanti, the path was excellent. The victory faded only in the final loss in Genzano di Roma against Follonica Gavorrano. The third place in the championship guarantees participation in the play-off for the repechage list. After the semi-final with Arzachena, the red and blue, on 8 June 2022, beat Afragolese at home in the final, thus guaranteeing the second slot of the potential admitted in the third series. In this perspective, the extra-football corporate operations in July, such as the renovation of parts of the Stadio Vanni Sanna and the transformation from Associazione Sportiva Dilettantistica to a limited liability company, thus changing its name to Torres Srl, had an impact. On 3 August 2022, following Campobasso and Teramo's exclusion for financial defaults from Serie C, the Sassaresi obtained the official repechage to Serie C, thus returning to the professional ranks after eight seasons of absence.

== Colours, badge and identity ==
=== Name ===
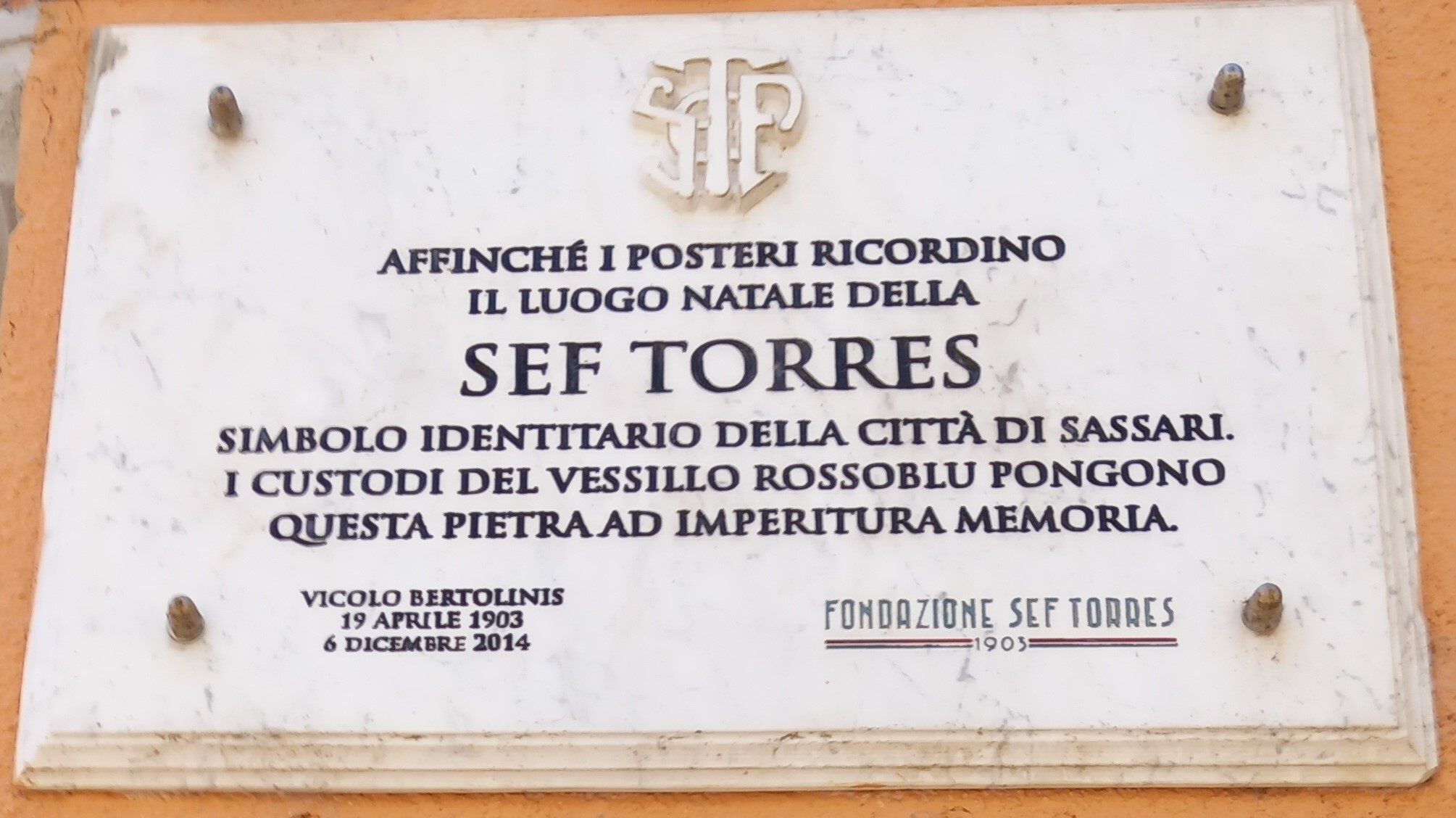
Plaque

The choice of the name Torres is due to one of the club's founders, Professor Berlinguer. Judicate of Logudoro or Torres was the medieval Sardinian Judicates in which Sassari was located in the north-western part of island. At the beginning of the 20th century, several Sardinian football clubs and sports associations chose names that recalled Sardinian history. It was due to a rediscovery of local identity that also took place through naming historical names.

=== Colours ===
The club's official colours are red and blue, following a survey by the founding members. They, looking for a gala suit, put three on display in a well-known city shop. What met with great success was a blue double-breasted jacket with red lapels.

The classic Torres uniform is the one commonly - but improperly - known as the red and blue quartered shirt: red on the right and blue on the left, with the sleeves, generally reversed, i.e. red on the left and blue on the right. On the left side, at heart, is the club's coat of arms, which for a long time was represented by a white shield with the heraldic coat of arms of the city of Sassari. Rarely this historical combination has undergone variations. In the 1977–1978 season, the two parts of the uniform were separated diagonally. In the 1980s, the uniform often had a single colour, red or blue, with trim in the opposite colour on the shoulders and above the heart. At the time, another jersey was also used, with red and blue vertical stripes. Particularly the uniform used in the 1997-1998 Serie C2, blue with a red vertical stripe running through the centre of the shirt, edged in white. This uniform is reminiscent of the classic combination of the French club Paris Saint-Germain. The classic second uniform is white with red-blue trim. Players have also worn white uniforms with a red-blue diagonal or horizontal stripe over the years.

1972-1973	1976-1977	1977-1978	1978-1979	1980-1981	1984-1985	1987-1988	1992-1994	1997-1998

=== Coat of arms ===
The club's emblem adopted by the club since the 1950s (and since then only modified from a graphic point of view, but never in substance) faithfully follows the heraldic coat of arms of the city of Sassari: a red and blue quartered shield, with a white tower drawn in the red quarters and an equally white cross in the blue ones.

== Honours and distinctions ==
=== National competitions ===
==== Leagues ====
- Serie C1 (Tier 3):
  - Third-place (1): 2005–06 Group B
- IV Serie / Serie C2 / Serie D (Tier 4):
  - Winners (4): 1956–57 Group F, 1971–72 Group F, 1986–87 Group A, 1999–00 Group B
  - Runners-up (3): 1954–55 Group F, 2015–16 Group G, 2019–20 Group G
  - Third-place (1): 1982–83 Group A
- Serie D (Tier 5):
  - Winners (3): 1980–81 Group D, 1992–93 Group F, 2012–13 Group G

==== Cups ====
- Coppa Cossu-Mariotti:
  - Winners (1): 1976–77, 1977–78
- Coppa Italia Dilettanti (interregional phase):
  - Winners (1): 1991–92
- Coppa Italia Serie D:
  - Runners-up (1): 2021–22

=== Sardinian competitions ===
==== Leagues ====
- Prima Divisione / Eccellenza (Tier 1):
  - Winners (3): 1949–50, 1950–51, 2011–12
  - Runners-up (1): 2010–11
  - Third-place (2): 1951–52 Group I, 2017–18
- Promozione (Tier 2):
  - Winners (1): 2008–09 Group B

==== Cups ====
- Sardinian Cup:
  - Winners (1): 2011–12
- Sardinian Supercup:
  - Winners (1): 2011–12

=== Friedlies trophies ===
- Campionati sardi di foot-ball:
  - Winners (1): 1911
- Coppa Città de La Maddalena:
  - Winners (1): 1912

=== Individual Player & Coach awards ===
Top Scorer

- (Greece) Theofilos Karasavvidis Serie C1:1999-00 (19 gol)

== Players ==
=== Current squad ===
As of 28 August 2026

Note: Flags indicate national team as defined under FIFA eligibility rules; some limited exceptions apply. Players may hold more than one non-FIFA nationality.

No.	Pos.	Nation	Player
1	GK	ITA	Domiziano Tirelli
3	DF	ITA	Gabriele Berto
4	MF	ITA	Michael Brentan
5	MF	ITA	Daniele Giorico
6	MF	ITA	Francesco Nunziatini
7	FW	ITA	Lorenzo Di Stefano
8	MF	ITA	Alessandro Masala
9	FW	ITA	Luigi Scotto
10	FW	ITA	Giuseppe Mastinu
12	GK	ITA	Andrea Zaccagno
15	MF	ITA	Matteo Liviero
17	MF	ITA	Marcello Sotgiu
18	MF	AUS	Nicholas Pennington

No.	Pos.	Nation	Player
20	FW	ITA	Alberto Lunghi
21	MF	ITA	Francesco Corsinelli
23	DF	ITA	Nicolò Antonelli
26	DF	FRA	Mamadou Kebbeh (on loan from Cesena)
29	FW	ITA	Sodiq Olayiwola
30	FW	ITA	Mohamed Sanat
32	MF	ITA	Michele Carboni
44	DF	ITA	Gianmaria Zanandrea
47	DF	ITA	Mattia Scaringi (on loan from Cremonese)
77	FW	ITA	Giacomo Zecca
99	FW	ITA	Daniele Sorrentino
—	DF	ITA	Christian Biagetti

=== Out on loan ===
Note: Flags indicate national team as defined under FIFA eligibility rules; some limited exceptions apply. Players may hold more than one non-FIFA nationality.

No.	Pos.	Nation	Player
—	MF	ITA	Gabriel Iovieno (at Atletico Lodigiani until 30 June 2027)
—	FW	ITA	Luca Bonin (at Brian Lignano until 30 June 2027)

No.	Pos.	Nation	Player
—	FW	ITA	Andrea Fois (at Latte Dolce until 30 June 2027)

== Notable former players ==
Albania
- (Albania) Ador Gjuci
- (Albania) Edgar Çani

Argentina

- (Argentina) Mauricio Sanna

Belgium

- (Belgium) Denis Dasoul
Greece
- (Greece) Theofilos Karasavvidis
- (Greece) Vasilios Kinalis
- (Greece) Charalampos Tsoulfas
- (Greece) Eleftherios Tzivanakis

Ivory Coast

- (Ivory Coast) Adama Diakité

Malta

- (Malta) Andrei Agius
Perù
- (Peru) Kevin Ramírez

Poland

- (Poland) Damian Rasak

San Marino

- (San Marino) Edoardo Colombo
Senegal
- (Senegal) Yves Baraye

Spain

- (Spain) Christian Rutjens

Venezuela

- (Venezuela) Giovanni Savarese

== League and cup history ==
Season	Division	Pld	W	D	L	GS	GA	Pts	Pos.	Domestic Cup	Other	Notes
2018–19	Serie D (IV)	38	12	4	22	35	59	40	15th			
2019–20	Serie D (IV)	26	14	9	3	44	25	51	3rd			
2020–21	Serie D (IV)	34	8	10	16	31	48	34	15th			
2021–22	Serie D (IV)	34	18	12	4	53	18	66	2nd	Runners-up		
2022–23	Serie C (III)	38	8	17	13	33	36	41	15th			
2023–24	Serie C (III)	38	22	9	7	56	38	75	2nd			

== Sports Center ==
Torres S.R.L trains in its own sports centre in the Latte Dolce district of Sassari. The Torres youth team plays its official matches on the sports centre's pitch. While around the Stadio Vanni Sanna there are 3 football fields for the Torres football school.

== Supporters ==
The ultras movement in Sassari was born in the mid-70s, with the first Ultras Capuccini group, Their name is inspired by the neighborhood they came from. However, some time must pass before we see a more organized and active group in the stands: it is 1979 and the 'Panthers' are born. In 1980/81 Torres was promoted to C2 and the 'Panthers' began to cross the Tyrrhenian Sea and make their first trips away from the island. Every Sunday was an adventure, in stadiums without escorts, two-day ship trips...! In '82/83 here are the 'Supporters' (which lasted the space of three seasons) and the 'Indians', groups made up of very young boys. In 85/86 the latter took over the reins of the curve given that the 'Panthers' had decided to give up and leave. In 86/87 the 'Warriors' made a brief appearance, but disappeared at the end of the season. For some years the fans were exclusively led by the 'Indians', but shortly thereafter several groups would be born. In '88/89 the 'Total Kaos' appeared and lasted two championships. In '89/90 the 'Teddy Boys' and the 'Nuova Guardia' arrived in the corner, which in addition to being the longest-lived group after that of the 'Indians', was also the only group to have left an imprint on the way of cheering in Sassari. The following season the 'Teddy Boys' changed their name and structure to become 'Alta Tensione', but they did not follow through and shortly afterwards they disbanded. In 93/94 it was the turn of the 'Sassari Brigade', a group that stayed in the corner for a couple of years. In 94/95 a timid attempt to reconstitute the 'Panthers' led to great tensions within the Sassari supporters. Since 95/96, therefore, two groups have occupied the north: the 'Nuova Guardia' and the 'Indians 1982'. This until the 98/99 season, which will see the appearance of one new group: the 'Ultras 1998'. During the 2012-2013 season, Ultras 1998 disbanded due to internal problems within the group. The Nuova Guardia 1989 thus remains the only organized group present in the Curva Nord until the 2023-2024 season. In September 2023, two new organized groups were born: 'Zero Testa' and 'Old Fans'.

== Friendships and Rivalries ==
The Nuova Guardia historical group Ultras of the Torres maintains friendly relations with Bastia, Pro Patria, Trento.

Old Fans group Ultras of the Torres maintains friendly relations with the Gubbio and Pescara.

the Torres ultras also have a historic friendship with ASD SEF Tempio Pausania.

The Torres ultras main rivalries are with Cagliari in which it is the Sardinia derby and Olbia with which and derby of northern Sardinia. Other rivalries are with Rimini, Varese, Spezia, Novara, ASD Termoli Calcio 1920, US Grosseto 1912.

== See also ==
- Torres Calcio Femminile
- U.S.D. Latte Dolce
- Dinamo Basket Sassari
