= Gioiese 1918 =

Italian football club

Gioiese
- Full name: A.S.D Gioiese 1918
- Founded: 1968
- Ground: Polivalente, Gioia Tauro, Calabria
- Capacity: 15,000
- Chairman: Nando Rombolà
- Manager: Mario Dal Torrione
- League: Serie D
- 2023–24: Serie D/I 18th of 19 (relegated)
Home colours	Away colours

A.S.D Gioiese 1918 is an Italian football club based in Gioia Tauro, Calabria. Currently it plays in Italy's Serie D.

== History ==
=== Gioiese ===
The first Gioiese was founded in 1918, and its colours was white and blue with stripes. The then president was Ugo Battaglini.

==== Serie C ====
The first experience Gioiese had of such level occurred after World War II, when he participated in Serie C known as Lega Interregionale South until 1948.

==== Serie C2 ====
With president Franco Musco Gioiese played at first at the Campionato Interregionale 1981–1982 with coach Franco Scoglio and won the championship by dominating from the first to the last day.

After the departure of Scoglio, the Gioiese prepared for next season in Serie C2 with a new coach Bruno Jacoboni, but the results came negative, with a relegation on the final day, despite beating Messina.

=== Libero Calcio Nuova Gioiese ===
The old Gioiese dissolved in 2004, overwhelmed by debts. So the first team of Gioia Tauro became Libero Calcio Nuova Gioiese, a team born in 1968 and which, under the leadership of president Rombolà, make a big climb from Seconda Categoria to Eccellenza.

==== Serie D ====
In the season 2012–13 the team was promoted from Eccellenza Calabria to Serie D.

In 2023 the team was promoted another time from Eccellenza Calabria to Serie D together with coach Graziano Nocera.

== Colors and badge ==
The team's colors are purple and white.
