= Stadio Vanni Sanna =

Italian multi-purpose stadium

- Stadio Acquedotto
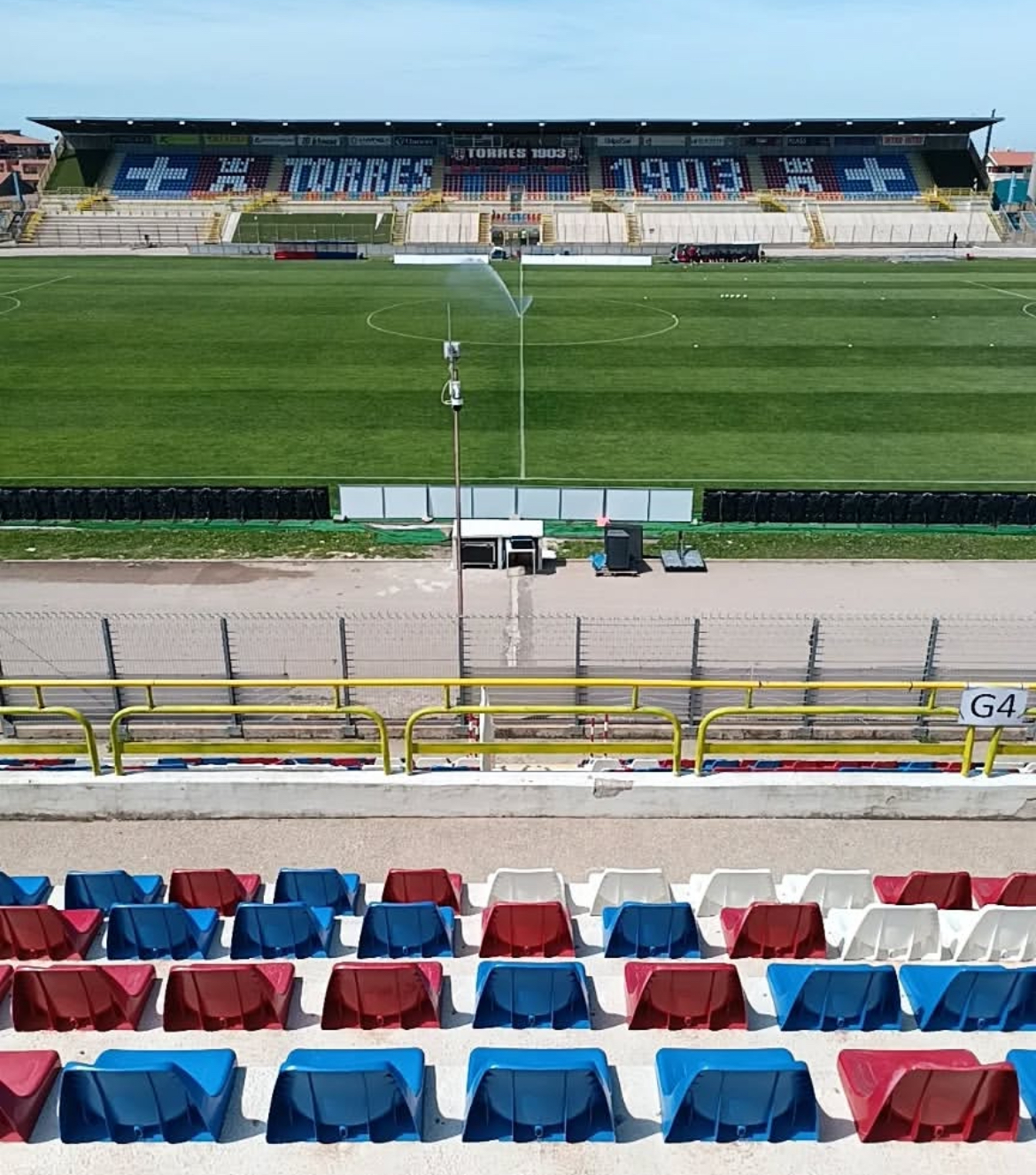
- Interactive map of Stadio Vanni Sanna
- Location: Via Coradduzza, 2; 07100 Sassari
- Coordinates: 40°43′5″N 8°34′47″E
- Capacity: 10.000 currently limited to 6.145
- Surface: Grass
- Field size: 105 x 67,5 m

Construction
- Opened: 1922
- Renovated: 2021-2025

Tenant
- S.E.F. Torres 1903

Stadio Vanni Sanna (formerly known as Stadio Acquedotto) is a multi-use stadium in Sassari, Italy. It is currently used mostly for football matches and is the home ground of S.E.F. Torres 1903. The stadium holds 10,000.

== History ==
Its first name was "Torres stadium", changed in the seventies to "Acquedotto stadium". On 22 August 2001 it changed its name and was named after Giovanni Sanna, a footballer originally from Alghero who in his career played in Torres 1903 first as a player, then as a coach and sports director. In 2013, a restyling project of the municipal stadium of Sassari was presented, developed with red and blue passion by the Sassari architects Marco Tola and Stefano Sechi, and presented by the Associazione Memoria storico Torresina and the Sef Torres 1903 Foundation with great enthusiasm. In 2020 an agreement was reached between the Torres club and the Municipality of Sassari to manage the stadium for the next 15 years and in 2021 a new turf was set up in order to improve and redevelop the structure.

== Sports activities ==
=== Soccer ===
The structure has always hosted the home games of S.E.F. Torres 1903, which currently plays in the Serie C championship. The stadium also hosts the matches of the Torres Calcio Femminile, winner of 7 Italian Championships, 7 Super Cups and 8 Italian Cups. From September 2021 the stadium will also be used again by U.S.D. Latte Dolce for home games.

== Extra-football activities ==
=== Concerts ===
On 18 August 1987, the concert of the Spandau Ballet was held at the stadium, in 1989 the stadium hosted a concert by Vasco Rossi and on 28 August 1991 Fabrizio De André also performed at the stadium. In 1994, the plant hosted the concert of Sting, accompanied by Tazenda. In August 1995, after a couple of days there was the concert of Litfiba and that of Pino Daniele. In 2006, the stadium hosted a concert by Luciano Ligabue with the support of Finley and Rio, a former group of Marco Ligabue.

Date	Concert	Tour	Spectators
18 August 1987	Spandau Ballet		
27 August 1988	Eros Ramazzotti		
29 September 1989	Vasco Rossi	Liberi liberi Tour (1989)	
27 August 1991	Fabrizio De André	Tour 1991	
23 September 1994	Tazenda, Sting	Ten Summoner's Tales	20000
21 August 1995	Litfiba	Spirito Tour 1995	
23 August 1995	Pino Daniele	Tour 1995	
17 August 1996	Claudio Baglioni	Io sono qui	
3 August 2002	Luciano Ligabue	LigaLive	15000
30 July 2006	Luciano Ligabue	Nome e cognome tour 2006	10000
1 August 2023	Placebo	Nome e cognome tour 2006	4500

== Location ==
The stadium is easily reachable by ATP Sassari urban transport with line 8 (which leaves from Sassari station) and from CS (Circola Sinistra) at the stop Piazzale Segni .

By car it can be reached from the SS 131, from which you have to take the exit for Viale Italia, turn right into Via Parigi, and immediately left into Via Washington; once you reach the Carabinieri Command, you need to turn right just before the roundabout and take via Verona and via Milano, continuing straight on at the traffic lights and at the next two roundabouts; at the third roundabout, turn into via Vardabasso: at the intersection with Via Carlo Felice, go straight through the roundabout and then turn left. Finally you arrive in Piazzale Segni, where there is a large parking lot.

== Gallery ==
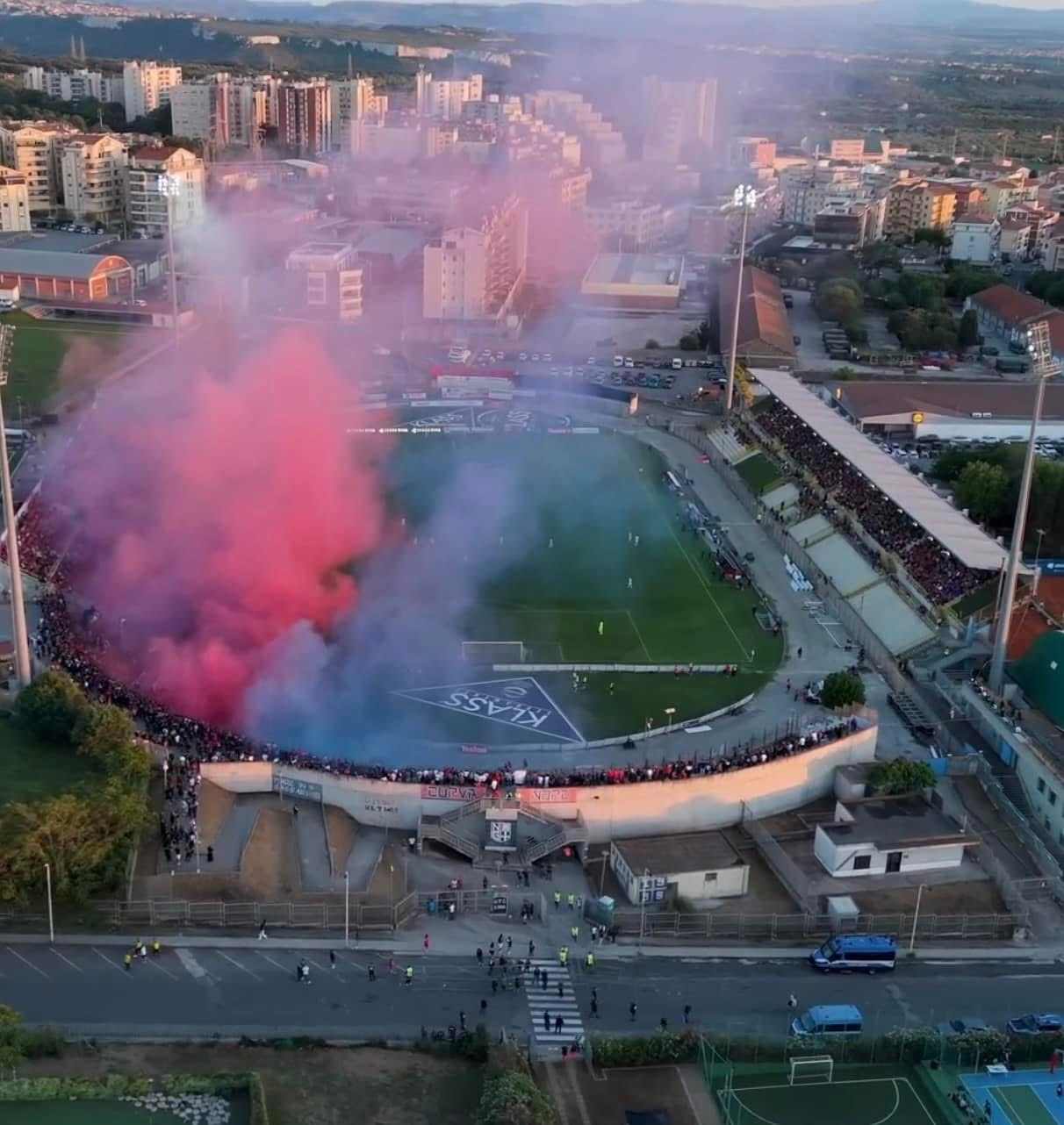
Stadio Vanni Sanna

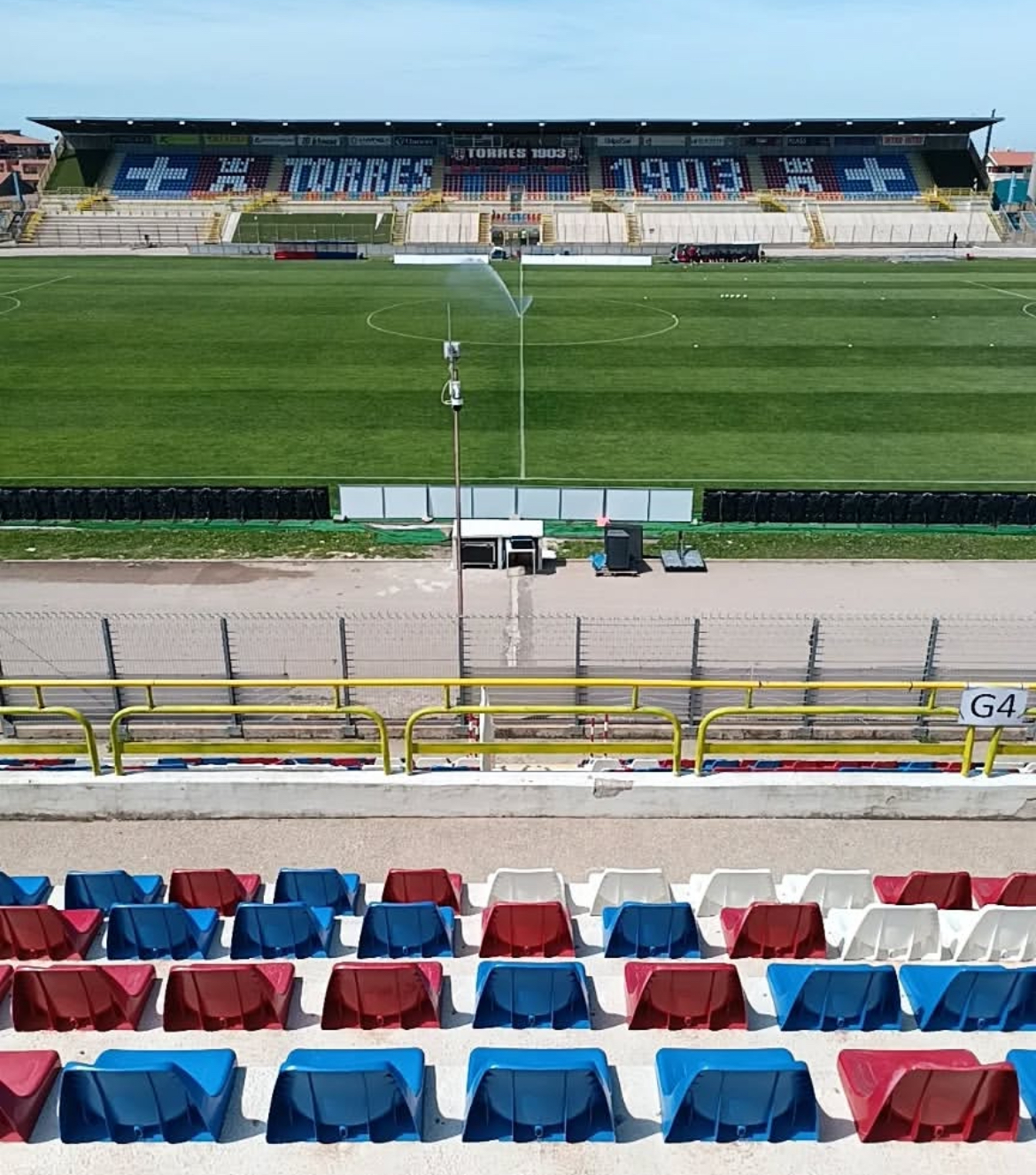
Stadio Vanni Sanna

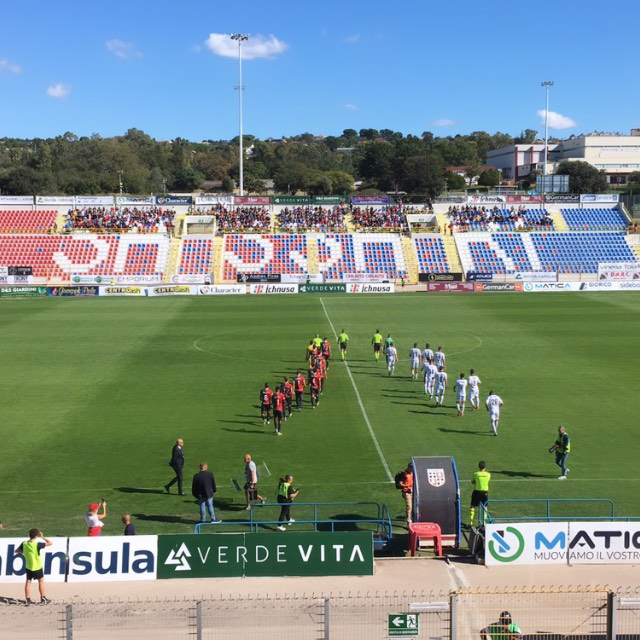
View of the Steps in October 2022

== See also ==
- Palasport Roberta Serradimigni
- Sassari
