= Rende Calcio 1968 =

Italian association football club

Rende
- Full name: Rende Calcio 1968
- Nickname: Biancorossi (Redandwhite)
- Founded: 1968 (Rende Calcio); 2007 (S.S. Rende)
- Ground: Stadio Marco Lorenzon, Rende, Italy
- Capacity: 5,000
- Chairman: Fabio Coscarella
- Manager: Pino Rigoli
- League: Eccellenza Calabria Group A
- Website: https://www.rendecalcio.it/
Home colours	Away colours	Third colours

Rende Calcio 1968 S.r.l. was an Italian football club, based in Rende, Calabria, and closed in 2026.

== History ==
=== Rende Calcio ===
Old logo of Rende

The club was founded in 1968 with the name Sesso Rende and renamed as Rende Calcio. The club's first coach was the late Mario Portone, who afterward became the mayor of the Calabrian city, and won promotion to Serie C2 for their first time in 1978, and then even Serie C1 one year later. Rende played a consecutive five Serie C1 seasons before being relegated back to Serie C2 in 1984, and Serie D in 1987. In 1992 the club relegated again, this time to Eccellenza Calabria, and returned to Serie D only in 1997.

Rende were relegated to Eccellenza again in 2000, but two consecutive promotions from 2003 to 2005 led the club back into professionalism, spending a total two seasons into Serie C2, and also playing in the Coppa Italia, losing 4–0 to Lazio in a one-legged round in Rome.

In July 2007 the club moved to Cosenza and changed its name to Fortitudo Cosenza, taking the place of local club A.S. Cosenza Calcio, that was facing financial problem. The owner of the club also changed from Franco Chiappetta to Damiano Paletta in March 2007.

=== S.S. Rende ===

The club was refounded in 2007 switching the denomination of the minor local club Santo Stefano to Società Sportiva Rende.

The club won Prima Categoria in 2008 and Promozione in 2009.

=== Return to Serie D ===
In the season 2012–13 the team was promoted from Eccellenza Calabria to Serie D to fill the vacancies created.

=== Return to Serie C ===
In the season 2016–17 the team played in Serie D and placed second in the football pitch. It also won the playoff final against Cavese for 2–1 at the Marco Lorenzon Stadium in Rende.

For this reason, the team was kicked off in Serie C 2017–2018.

== Colors and badge ==
The team's colors are red and white.
