= Chermayeff =

Chermayeff may refer to:

- Chermayeff & Geismar, a prominent design studio in New York
- Ivan Chermayeff, an American graphic designer
- Serge Chermayeff, a British architect
