= Tunnard =

Tunnard is a surname. Notable people with the surname include:

- Christopher Tunnard (1910–1979), Canadian-born landscape architect
- John Tunnard (1900–1971), English Modernist designer and painter
- Thomas Tunnard (1918–2012), English cathedral organist
- Viola Tunnard (1916–1974), English pianist
