= Mackey Saturday =

American graphic designer

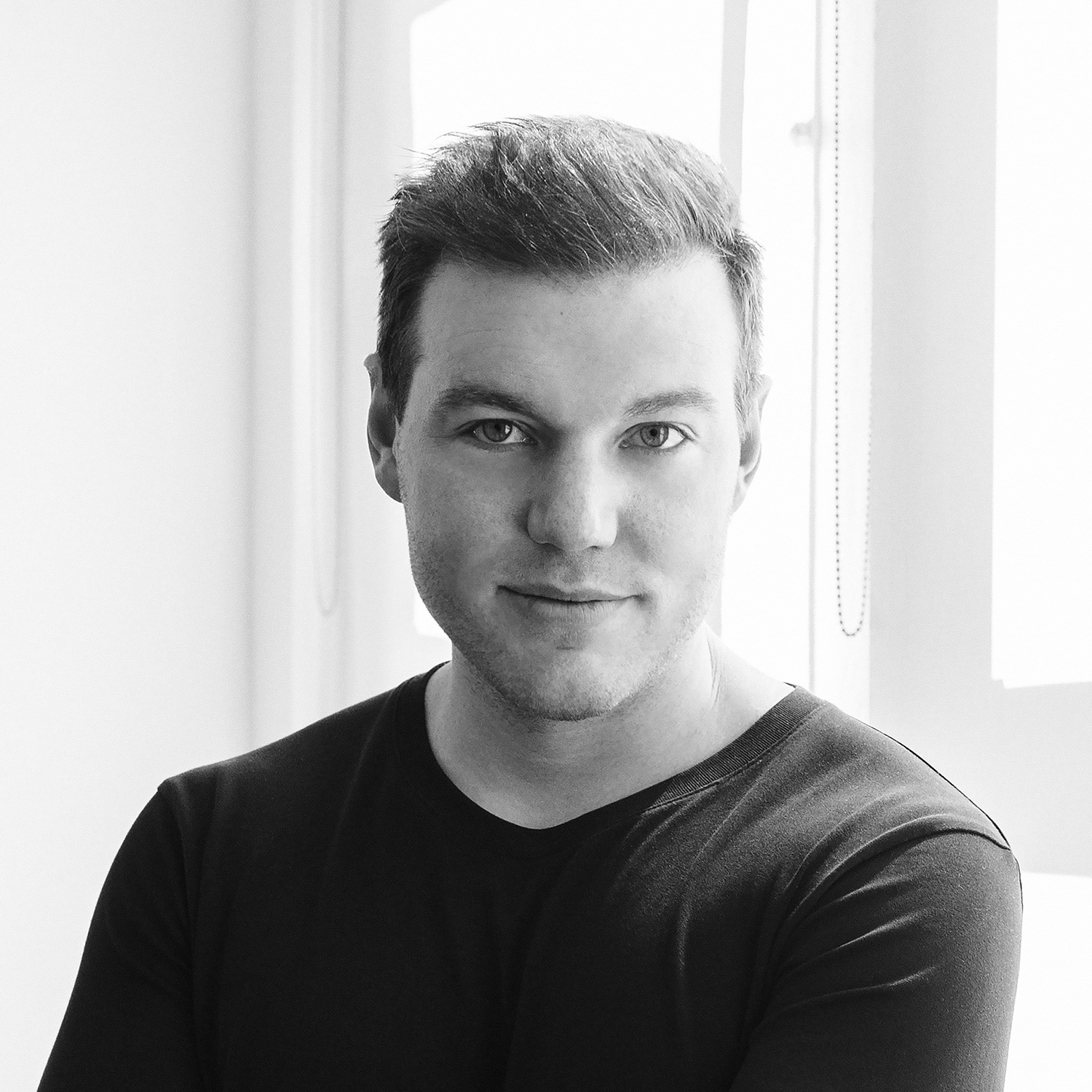
- Saturday in 2016
- Born: 1985 (age 40–41); Chico, CA
- Education: University of Northern Colorado (BFA, 2007)
- Occupations: Owner, Mackey Saturday (2008-present); Principal designer, Chermayeff & Geismar & Haviv (2016-19)
- Years active: 2007-present
- Spouse: Trisha Saturday
- Website: mackeysaturday.com

Instagram logo designed by Saturday, 2013.

Mackey Saturday is an American designer and typographer whose work includes logos for Instagram, Oculus and Luxe. He runs a graphic design firm Mackey Saturday and was formerly a principal at New York City design firm Chermayeff & Geismar & Haviv.

== Early life and education ==
Saturday was born in Chico, California. He attended Kelly Walsh High School in Casper, Wyoming, and studied design at the University of Northern Colorado in Greeley, Colorado.

== Career ==
=== Mackey Saturday design firm (2008–present) ===
After first discussing a potential redesign of Instagram's logo with Instagram co-founder Kevin Systrom in 2011, Saturday began work on the redesign the following year. While he was in the middle of working on the design, Facebook acquired Instagram for $1 billion. Saturday redrew the app's previous Billabong webfont by hand to create a cleaner, more elegant and fluid design. His subtle redesign maintained the style of the original while cleaning up the script-style font. It was noted in particular for making the "I" look more like an I, as it formerly resembled a J or a g. Saturday's intent was to create a logotype that would stand the test of time, like Kellogg's, Campbell's and Coca-Cola. The new logo was released in May 2013 alongside the app's new photo tagging feature.

Saturday worked with fellow designers Cory Schmitz and Nicolaus Taylor to create a sleek, minimalist new logo for virtual reality company Oculus, following its 2014 acquisition by Facebook. They dropped the eye design of the previous logo in favor of a sideways O shaped like the company's headsets. The logotype was updated as well, with a rounded look to complement the new logo.

Saturday created the logo for on-demand parking service Luxe. The new, simpler look was launched in July 2015. He also designed the logo for technology company Hello.

In 2015, Saturday redesigned the logo for event ticket marketplace SeatGeek, with a simple theater seat and the company name in a clean sans-serif custom font. The arms and curve of the seat resemble eyes and a smiling mouth. The new logo launched in February 2016.

In 2017, Saturday designed a new logotype for Silk, a brand of dairy-alternative products. In 2018, he created new logos for Unsplash, a stock photography website; and for financial technology company Affirm.

Saturday is a founder of Brooklyn-based family planning company Dadi, which focuses on male fertility and reproductive health and was launched in April 2019.

=== Chermayeff & Geismar & Haviv (2016-19) ===
In 2016, Saturday joined Chermayeff & Geismar & Haviv as a principal. The New York-based branding and graphic design firm was founded by Ivan Chermayeff and Tom Geismar in 1957, and has designed iconic logos for companies including NBC, Mobil and Chase Bank. Saturday left the firm in 2019.

== Personal life ==
After a decade living in Denver, Colorado, in 2016 Saturday and his wife relocated to Brooklyn, New York. Saturday is an avid skateboarder and surfer.
