= Sagi Haviv =

Israeli graphic designer (born 1974)

- שגי חביב
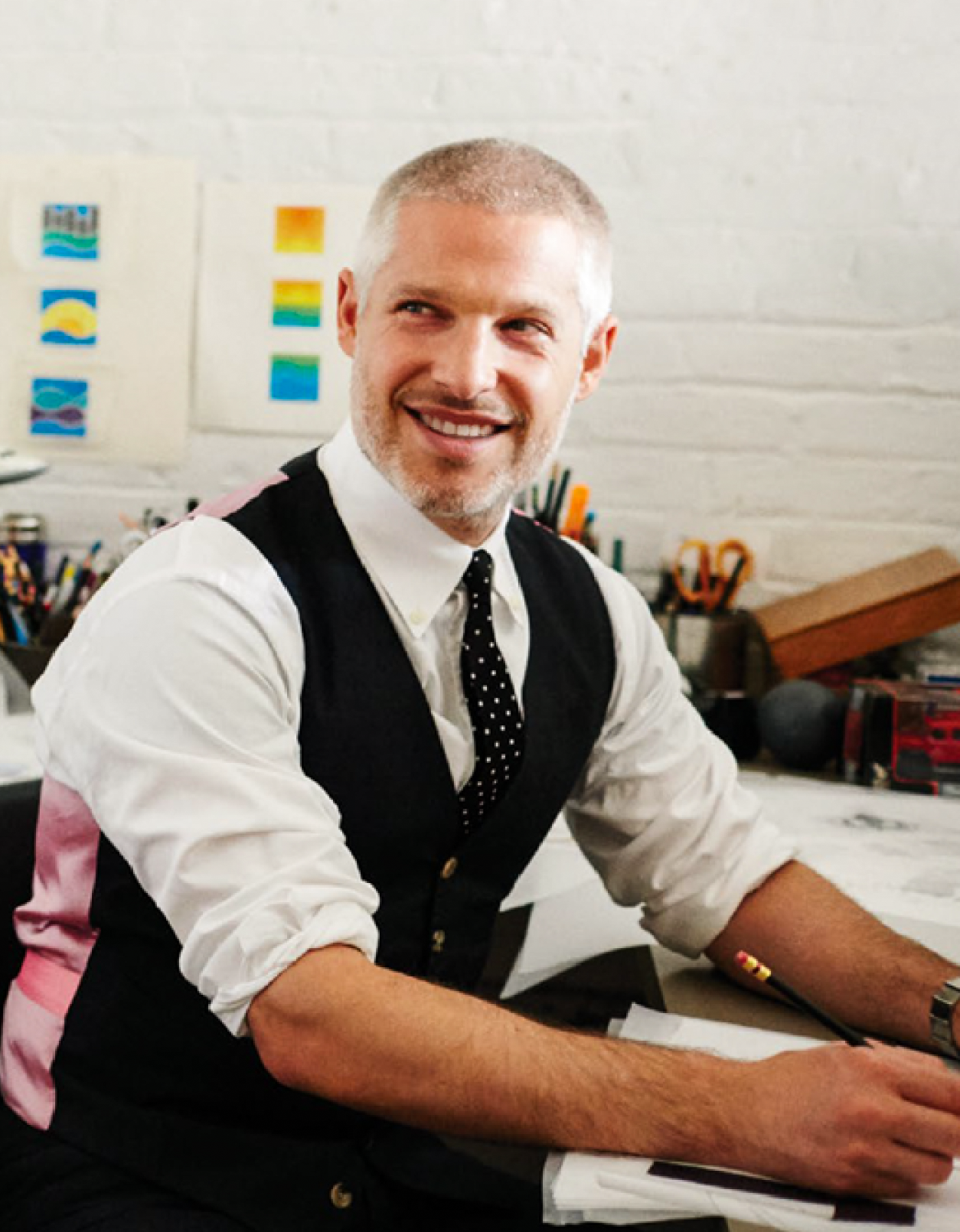
- Born: 1974 (age 51–52); Kibbutz Nachshonim, Israel
- Education: The Cooper Union
- Occupation: Partner at Chermayeff & Geismar & Haviv
- Known for: Graphic designer

Sagi Haviv (Hebrew: שגי חביב; /səˌɡiː həˈviːv/ sə-GHEE hə-VEEV; born 1974) is a New York graphic designer and a partner in the design firm Chermayeff & Geismar & Haviv. Called a "logo prodigy" by The New Yorker, and a "wunderkind" by Out magazine, he is best known for having designed the trademarks and visual identities for brands and institutions such as Discovery, Inc.'s online streaming service Discovery+, the United States Olympic & Paralympic Museum, the US Open tennis tournament, Conservation International, Harvard University Press, L.A. Reid's Hitco Entertainment, and tech and electric car company Togg.

== Biography ==
Haviv was born in Nachshonim, Israel, where he spent his early life. He studied at the Telma Yelin art high school in Givataim. In 1996, Haviv moved to New York. He studied graphic design at The Cooper Union School of Art where he earned a Bachelor of Fine Arts.

Haviv joined Chermayeff & Geismar in 2003. There he created Logomotion, a ten-minute motion graphics tribute to the firm’s famous logos, which was exhibited in New York (2003), at Corcoran Gallery of Art in Washington, D.C. (2004), at the Ginza Graphic Gallery in Tokyo (2005), at Centro in Mexico City (2006), and at the Pera Museum in Istanbul (2007).

In 2006 Haviv became a partner at Chermayeff & Geismar. In 2013, his name was added to the company's masthead, making it Chermayeff & Geismar & Haviv. He has since developed institutional and corporate identities, print and motion graphics, and art in architecture for a diverse array of clients worldwide. Haviv’s motion graphics work includes the main titles for PBS documentary series Carrier and Circus, and a typographic animation for Alicia Keys and Youssou N’dour’s 2009 performance at The Black Ball.

== Published books ==
In 2011, he co-authored with Tom Geismar and Ivan Chermayeff the book Identify: Basic Principles of Identity Design in the Iconic Trademarks of Chermayeff & Geismar. The book was published by Print magazine's book imprint (ISBN 978-1440310324).

In 2018, he co-authored Identity: Chermayeff & Geismar & Haviv. The book was published by Standards Manual (ISBN 0692955232).

== Conferences and awards chairing ==
Haviv has spoken about logo design at the Adobe Max Creativity Conference, TEDx, the AIGA, the HOW Design Conference, the Brand New Conference, Princeton University, the Onassis Foundation, the American Advertising Federation, Columbia Business School, Creative Mornings, and Collision.

He has served as jury chair for the Clio Awards and the Art Directors Club and was the jury president for the 2019 D&AD Awards.

== Teaching ==
Haviv teaches corporate identity design at The School of Visual Arts in New York City. He has also taught online courses on logo design for Skillshare and Domestika.

== Published articles ==
Haviv has written on the topic of identity design for Creative Review, Domestika, Print magazine, Computer Arts, and D&AD

== Awards ==
In 2004, Haviv received the Tokyo Type Directors Club award for Logomotion, for which he also won an award from the New York Art Directors Club.

== Logos designed ==
Discovery+ logo designed by Sagi Haviv

The logo for Conservation International designed by Sagi Haviv.

The logo for Harvard University Press, designed by Sagi Haviv.

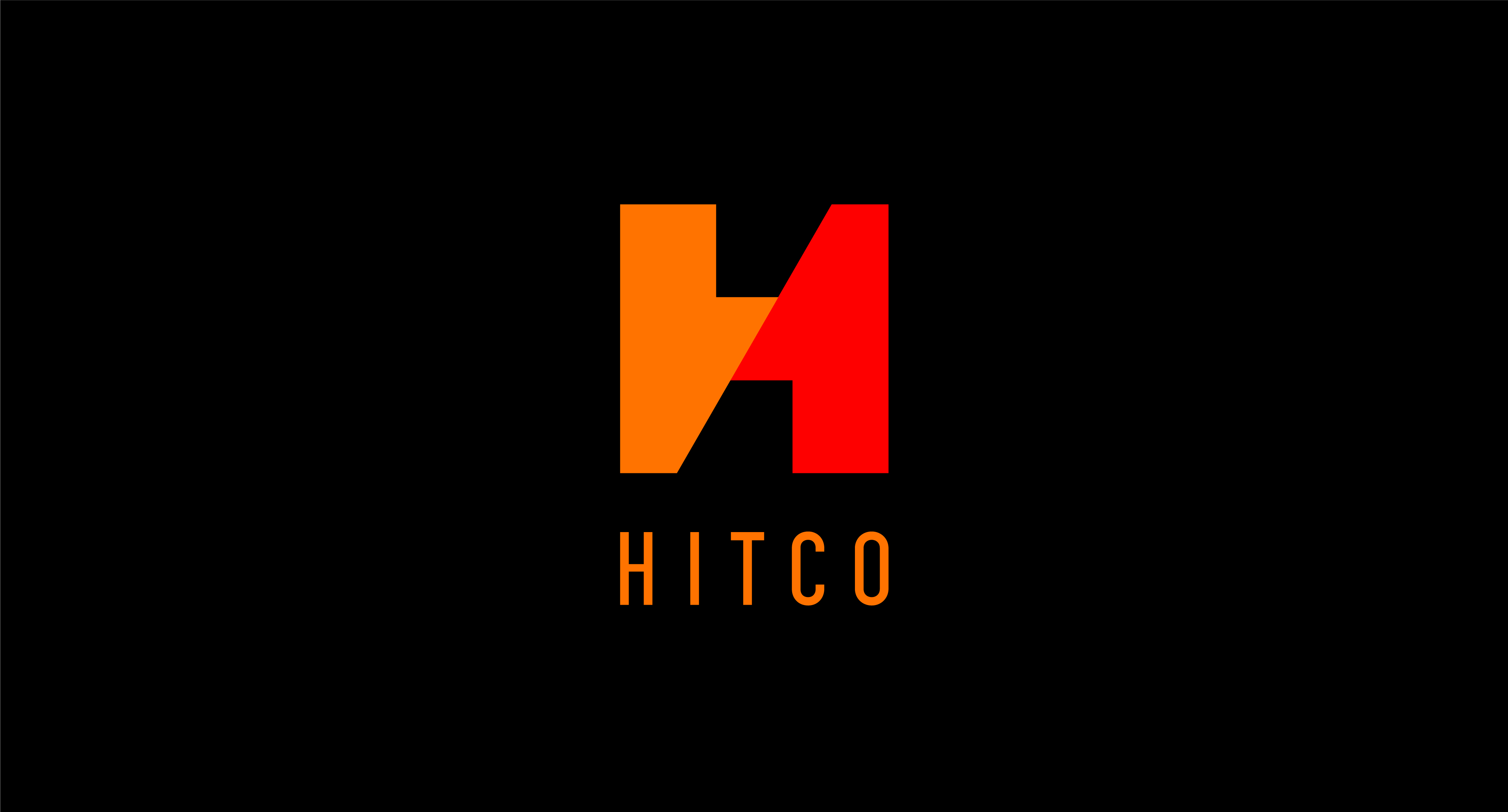
Logo for L.A. Reid's Hitco Entertainment designed by Sagi Haviv

U.S. Open Tennis Championships designed by Sagi Haviv

logo for Togg electric car and tech company designed by Sagi Haviv
