= Visible Language =

American journal

Visible Language, issue 36.2

Visible Language is an American journal presenting visual communication research. Founded in 1967 as The Journal of Typographical Research by Merald Wrolstad, occasional Visible Language issues are co-edited with a guest editor-author.

The journal was founded with the primary tenet of the journal being that reading and writing together form a new, separate, and autonomous language system. The journal has evolved to focus on research in visual communication. The journal has covered the subject of concrete poetry, the Fluxus art movement, painted text, textual criticism, the abstraction of symbols, articulatory synthesis and text, and the evolution of the page from print to on-screen display. Guest editor-authors have included Colin Banks, John Cage, Adrian Frutiger, Dick Higgins, Richard Kostelanetz, Craig Saper, and George Steiner.

The journal was edited for 26 years (1987–2012) by Sharon Poggenpohl of the Illinois Institute of Technology's Institute of Design, with administrative offices at the Rhode Island School of Design. It is currently edited by Mike Zender of the University of Cincinnati, which publishes and provides administrative offices for the journal.
