= Michel Averseng =

French sculptor

Michel Averseng (born August 1936, Toulouse, France) is a French sculptor.

== Artistic career ==
Averseng studied at the School of Fine Arts of Toulouse, then within Marcel Gimond's studio at the National Superior School of Fine Arts in Paris.

Averseng then fulfilled his national service in Algeria. After returning to France, he was awarded several prizes, including from the Renault Foundation, and a scholarship from the Japanese government.

Averseng lived in Japan for two years, during which he created the monumental sculpture Okasan and Akachan for the Masuda Studio of Kyoto. This work gave Averseng the opportunity to become acquainted with bronze foundry work. Averseng traveled in East Asia, including Cambodia, then lived for two years in Australia.

Averseng returned to France in 1971, where he continued to sculpt. His work has been exhibited in Paris and many other French cities. In 1978, Averseng built his own foundry.

In the 1990s, Averseng taught sculpture and drawing in Chaville. In 2002, he moved to the south of France near his home town of Toulouse, where he continued to sculpt.

=== Prizes ===
Averseng has been awarded many prestigious prizes:

- Institut de France, Académie des Beaux-Arts: Claude Raphaël Leygue's prize, Hector Lefuel's prize, Eugène Piot's prize

- Salon des Artistes Français: Honor Medal (2000)

- Fondation Taylor: Charles Malfray's prize, Taylor's prize, André Graëc's grand prize (2006)

- Sculpture prize at [Sainte-Maure-de-Touraine] exhibition

- Académie du Languedoc (wiki in French): Carlo Sarrrabezolles' prize (2006)

- 16th Salon national des Peintres de l'Armée aux Invalides: Sculpture prize (2009)

== Organizational work ==
Averseng is a member of the board of the Society of Visual Artists (ADAGP) (French: Société des Auteurs Dans Les Arts Graphiques et Plastiques)), the organization charged with protecting French artists' rights and royalties.

For many years, Averseng has been active in organizing the Salon, the annual exhibition of the Society of French Artists (established 1881). From January 19, 2010 to 2011, Averseng was vice president of the Society. He also was President of the sculpture division of the Society of French Artists for several years.
