= Bentley Wood, East Sussex =

Coordinates: 50.92926°N 0.12295°E

Bentley Wood, also known as the House at Halland, is a Modernist house designed by the Russian émigré architect Serge Chermayeff and built in a rural location in the Low Weald in Sussex with views to the South Downs. In the Architects' Journal, Charles Herbert Reilly described it on completion in 1938 as "a regular Rolls-Royce of a house". It is considered to be one of the most influential modern houses of the period. It become a Grade II listed building in March 2020.

== Background ==
Serge Chermayeff (1900-1996) was born in Grozny, then in the Russian Empire, but lived in England from an early age. He was a self-taught architect, and worked in partnership with Erich Mendelsohn from 1933 to 1936, collaborating on a series of Modernist buildings, including the Grade I listed De La Warr Pavilion in Bexhill.

Chermayeff bought 52 hectares (130 acres) from the Bentley Farm estate in 1935, with the plan to build himself a country house for his family. The site is close to the village of Halland, near the A22 road from London to Eastbourne, some 20 kilometres (12 mi) northeast of Lewes.

Chermayeff's own unashamedly modernist plans were initially rejected by Uckfield Rural District Council, as being out of keeping with the area, but planning permission was granted in early 1937 after an inquiry.

== Description ==
The main house is a rectangular two-storey structure with a flat roof, a double square measuring 66 by 33 feet (20 m × 10 m). It was built and clad with timber, with jarrah wood from Australia used along with softwood in the structure, and horizontal exterior cladding using Western Red Cedar from Canada. The long sides, facing to the north (entrance) and the south (garden), have six bays each of four 2 ft 9 in (0.84 m) units, so 11 ft (3.4 m) each. A pergola extends along the north (entrance) front and along the west side of the single-service wing to the east of the main block. The frame was prefabricated at the workshop of Holland, Hannen & Cubitts on Gray's Inn Road, London, with engineering input from Felix Samuely, using knowledge of novel jointing techniques from buildings in Germany. The job architect was H.J. Whitfield Lewis, who was London County Council's principal housing architect in the 1950s.

On the south front, full-height windows and sliding doors on the ground floor open onto a raised terrace along the side of the house, with a single balcony outside the bedrooms on the first floor. The exposed timber frame, painted white, clearly delineates a strong grid pattern of the six bays and two floors. The eastern end of the garden terrace extends to the south, and Henry Moore was commissioned to provide a stone sculpture form, his Recumbent Figure 1938, for a plinth at the end of the terrace. The surrounding landscaping was designed by Christopher Tunnard.

The semi-open interior was divided by a spine wall, with the entrance hall, kitchen and stairs to the north, and the main living areas to the south, three steps lower, overlooking the garden. The decoration included exotic hardwood veneers, and cork floors. It was decorated with artworks by modern artists, including Ben Nicholson, John Piper and Barbara Hepworth.

== History ==
The house was completed in 1938, and was visited by Ernő Goldfinger and by Frank Lloyd Wright, but it was sold after Chermayeff was declared bankrupt the following year. He emigrated to the US in 1940.

The house was acquired by Sir William Emsley Carr. He added a single storey extension to the west, a first-floor extension above the servants' quarters to the east, and enclosed the two previously open central loggia bays on the upper floor. The additions are clad vertically with cedar, distinguishing them from the original parts. The house was sold again in 1979 and 1999, and then for £1.23 million in May 2002. Over time, owners made further unsympathetic additions and alterations, including the removal of built-in cupboards, separating the drawing room and dining room, adding a fireplace, replacing most of the windows, and adding a Doric entrance porch. The grounds were also altered, with the addition of a large pond, a swimming pool within an enclosure, and a sunken tennis court.

Nikolaus Pevsner included the building in his list of 50 interwar buildings suitable for listing, the so-called "Pevsner 50" drawn up in 1967, from which 48 buildings were listed in 1968. Bentley Wood was one of the two rejected, despite being one of 23 buildings in Pevsner's most important "A" list, probably due to the alterations. It was considered for listing in 2002 but rejected due to the additional and alterations. More recently, some of the alterations have been removed to restore more of Chermayeff's original conception. The restored house was sold in March 2020 for £3.165m, and in the same month it was listed at Grade II.
