= Hugo Weber =

Swiss-born avant-garde artist and educator

- Born: Hugo Edmond Weber; 4 May 1918; Basel, Switzerland
- Died: 15 August 1971 (aged 53); New York City, U.S.
- Education: University of Basel
- Movement: Abstract Art

Hugo Edmond Weber (1918–1971) was a Swiss-born, American artist and arts educator. Weber was known as an abstract, avant‐garde artist active in Chicago, Paris and New York City between the 1940s–1971. He worked mainly in painting but was also known to work in bronze for sculpture.

== Biography ==
Weber was born in Basel, Switzerland in 4 May 1918. He studied painting at the University of Basel, studying with artist Ernst Suter. He moved to Paris, France by 1939 and was studying art with sculptor Marcel Gimond. Through this relationship with Gimond, Weber met with Aristide Maillol, Hans Arp, and Alberto Giacometti, artists he later worked with as an artist assistant.

In 1949, he moved to Chicago, Illinois to work as a teacher of the first year foundation studies at IIT Institute of Design, replacing Laszlo Moholy‐Nagy. Weber's students include artist June Leaf and designer Richard Schultz. He worked collaboratively with Emerson Woelffer from IIT, in designing the Chicago-based Jazz Ltd. building's avant-garde room.

From 1955 until 1960, Weber lived in Paris, then moved to New York City. In New York, he befriended many of the second generation New York Abstract Expressionist artists, and he grew interest in beat poetry and writing. Weber was a gestural artist, but he was not rooted from American Action Painting like many of the others of the New York School of American Abstract Expressionism but rather from the European "style informel".

He created two films highlighting his process as an artist, Vision in Flux (1951), and Process Documentation by the Painter (1954).

In February and March of 1964, Weber created lithographs at Tamarind Institute with master printer Irwin Hollander.

He died 15 August 1971 at the age 53, in New York City after a short illness.

His work is in various public art collections including Smithsonian American Art Museum, National Gallery of Art, Art Institute of Chicago, and others. Weber's bust portrait in bronze of his friend, architect Mies van der Rohe is in the Crown Hall of IIT Campus.

== Bibliography ==
- Baumann, Felix (1984). Hugo Weber (Art Catalog from Kunsthaus Zürich) (in German).
