= De La Warr Pavilion =

Arts centre and gallery in Bexhill-on-Sea, East Sussex, England

Coordinates: 50.8375°N 0.4716°E

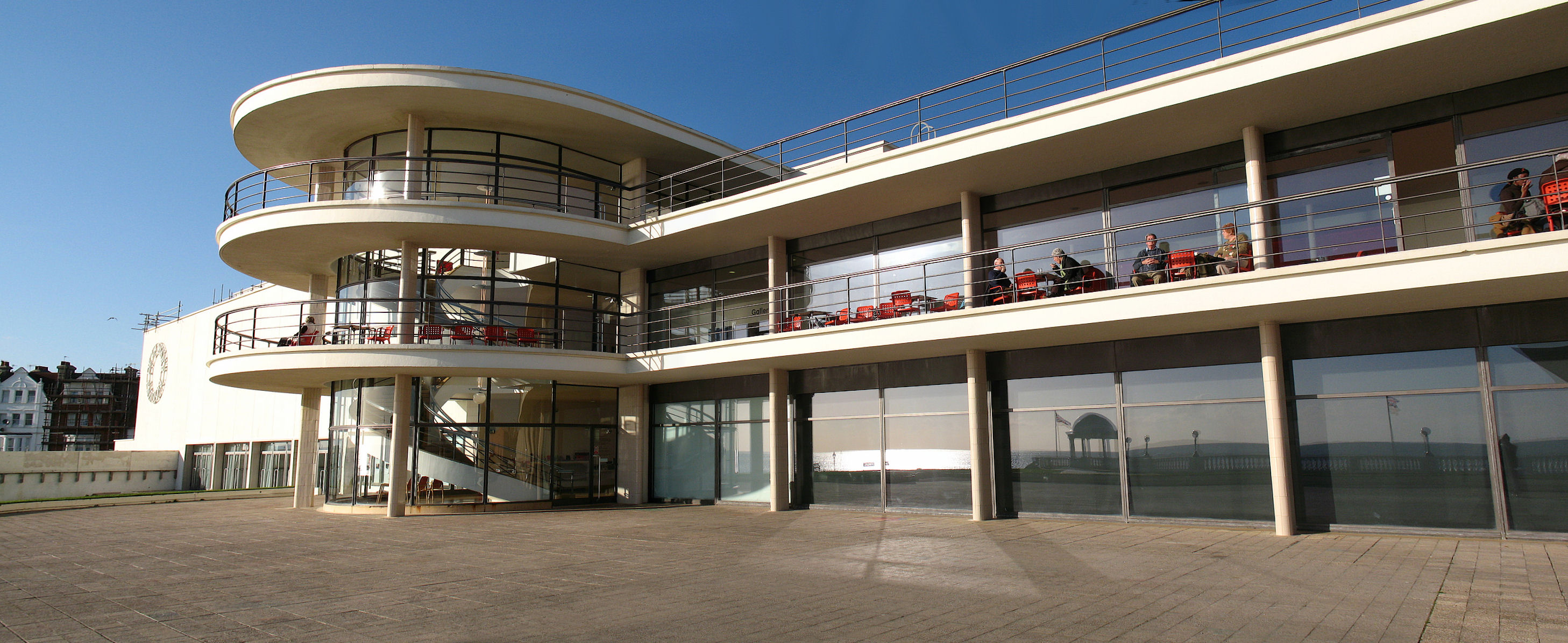
The De La Warr Pavilion

The De La Warr Pavilion is a grade I listed building, located on the seafront at Bexhill-on-Sea, East Sussex, on the south coast of England.

The Modernist and International Style building was designed by the architects Erich Mendelsohn and Serge Chermayeff and constructed in 1935. It has been described by Historic England as the UK's first public building built in the Modernist style.

In 2005, after an extensive restoration, the De La Warr Pavilion reopened as a contemporary arts centre, encompassing one of the largest galleries on the south coast of England.

On 18 February 2022, the bandstand, added early in the 21st century, was destroyed by strong winds from Storm Eunice.

== History ==
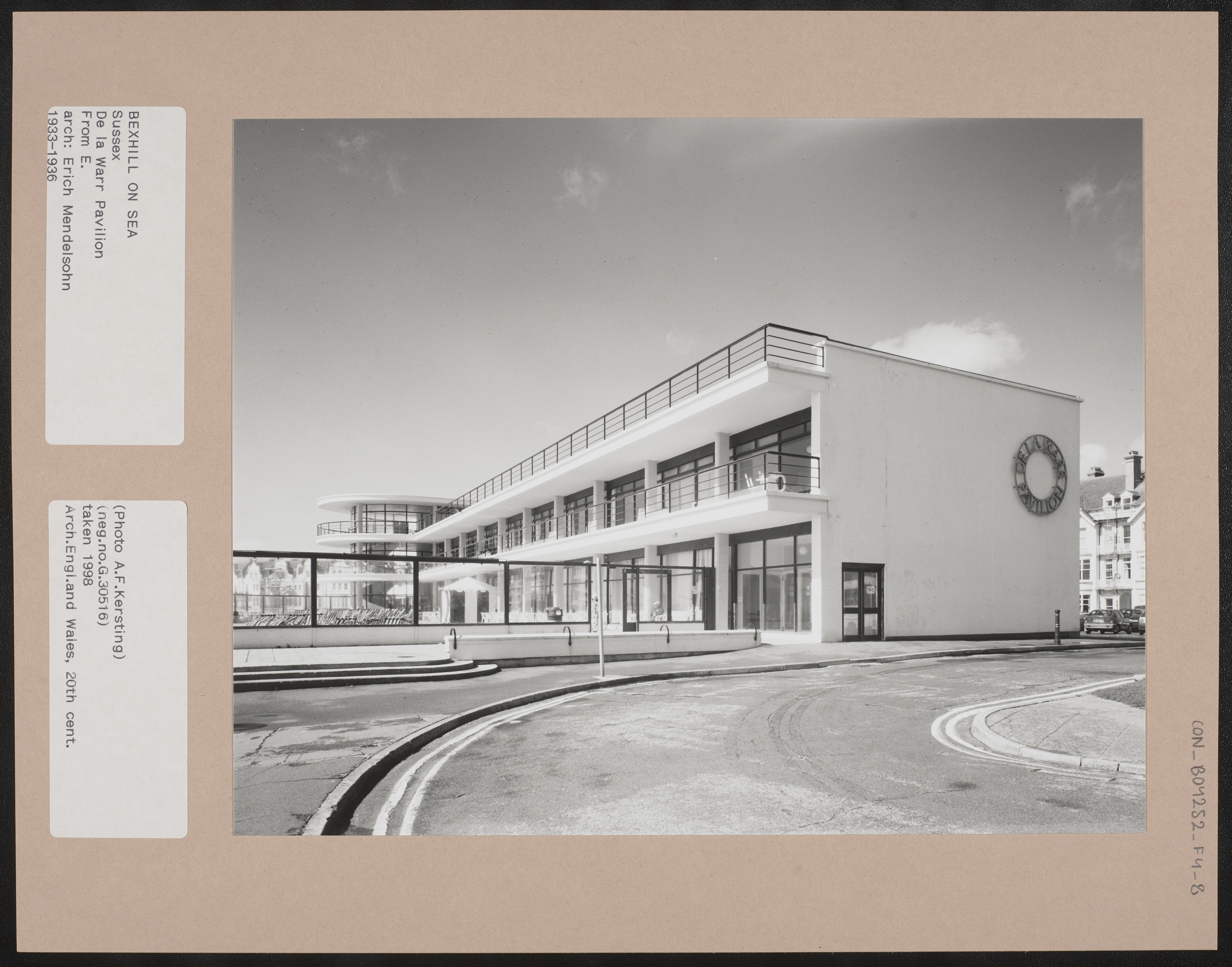
The pavilion photographed by Anthony F. Kersting, 1998

The new seafront building was the result of an architectural competition initiated by Herbrand Sackville, 9th Earl De La Warr, after whom the building was named.

The 9th Earl, a committed socialist and Mayor of Bexhill, persuaded Bexhill council to develop the site as a public building. The competition was announced in the Architects' Journal in February 1934, with a programme that specified an entertainment hall to seat at least 1,500 people; a 200-seat restaurant; a reading room; and a lounge. Initially, the budget for the project was limited to £50,000, although this was later raised to £80,000. Run by the Royal Institute of British Architects, the competition attracted over 230 entrants, many of them practising in the Modernist style.

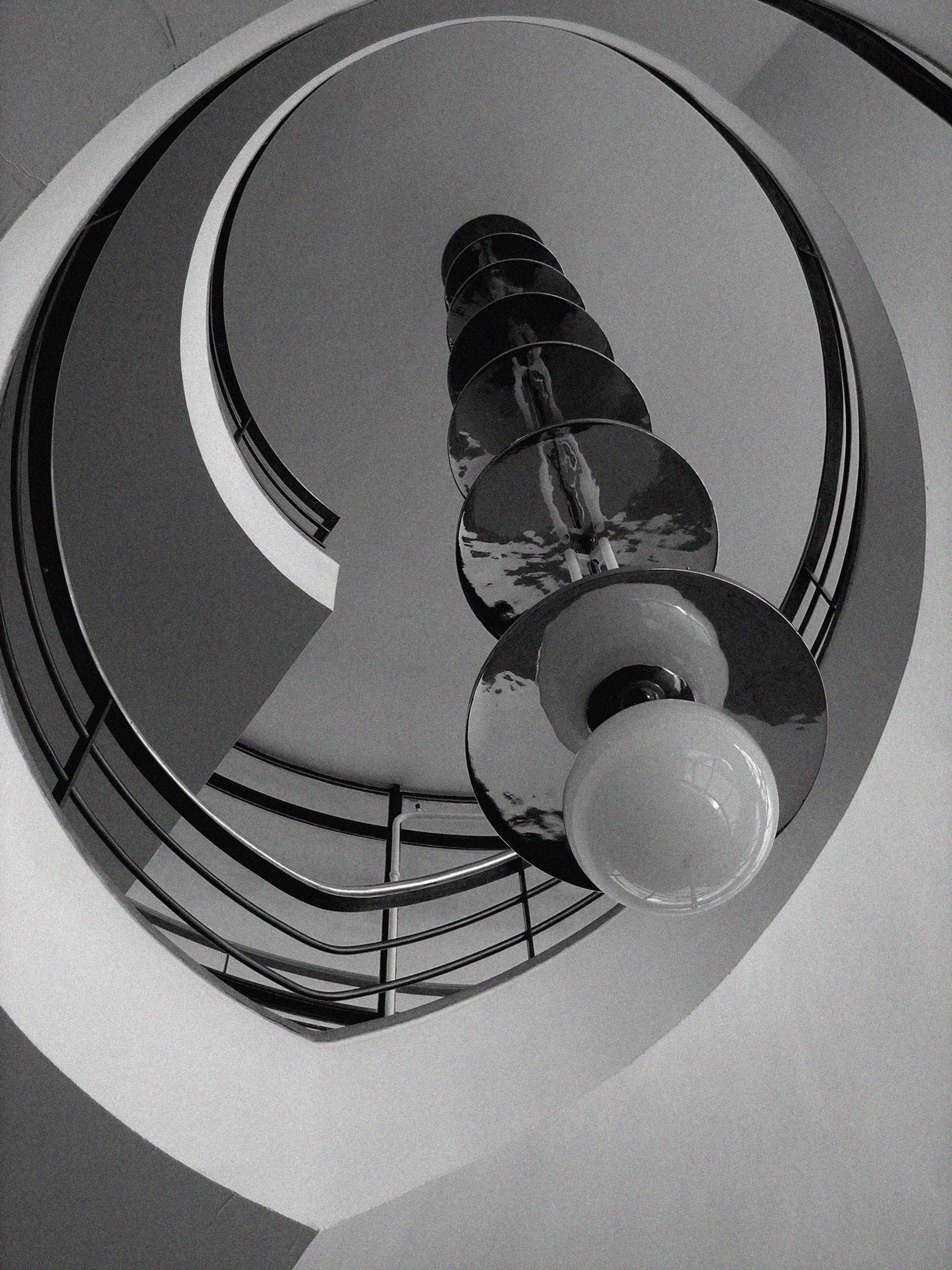
Shapes tend towards streamlined, industrially-influenced designs.

The architects selected for the project, Erich Mendelsohn and Serge Chermayeff, were leading figures in the Modern Movement. The aesthetics employed in the International Style proved especially suited to the building, tending towards streamlined, industrially-influenced designs, often with expansive metal-framed windows, and eschewing traditional brick and stonework in favour of concrete and steel construction. Amongst the building's most innovative features was its use of a welded steel frame construction, pioneered by structural engineer Felix Samuely. Construction of the De La Warr Pavilion began in January 1935. The building was opened on 12 December of the same year by the Duke and Duchess of York (later King George VI and Queen Elizabeth).

During World War II, the De La Warr Pavilion was used by the military. Bexhill and Sussex in general were vulnerable if the Germans decided to mount an invasion (Operation Sea Lion). Amongst those who served at the pavilion during the war was Spike Milligan, later a noted comedian. The building suffered minor damage to its foundations when the Metropole hotel adjacent to the building's western side was destroyed by German bombers.

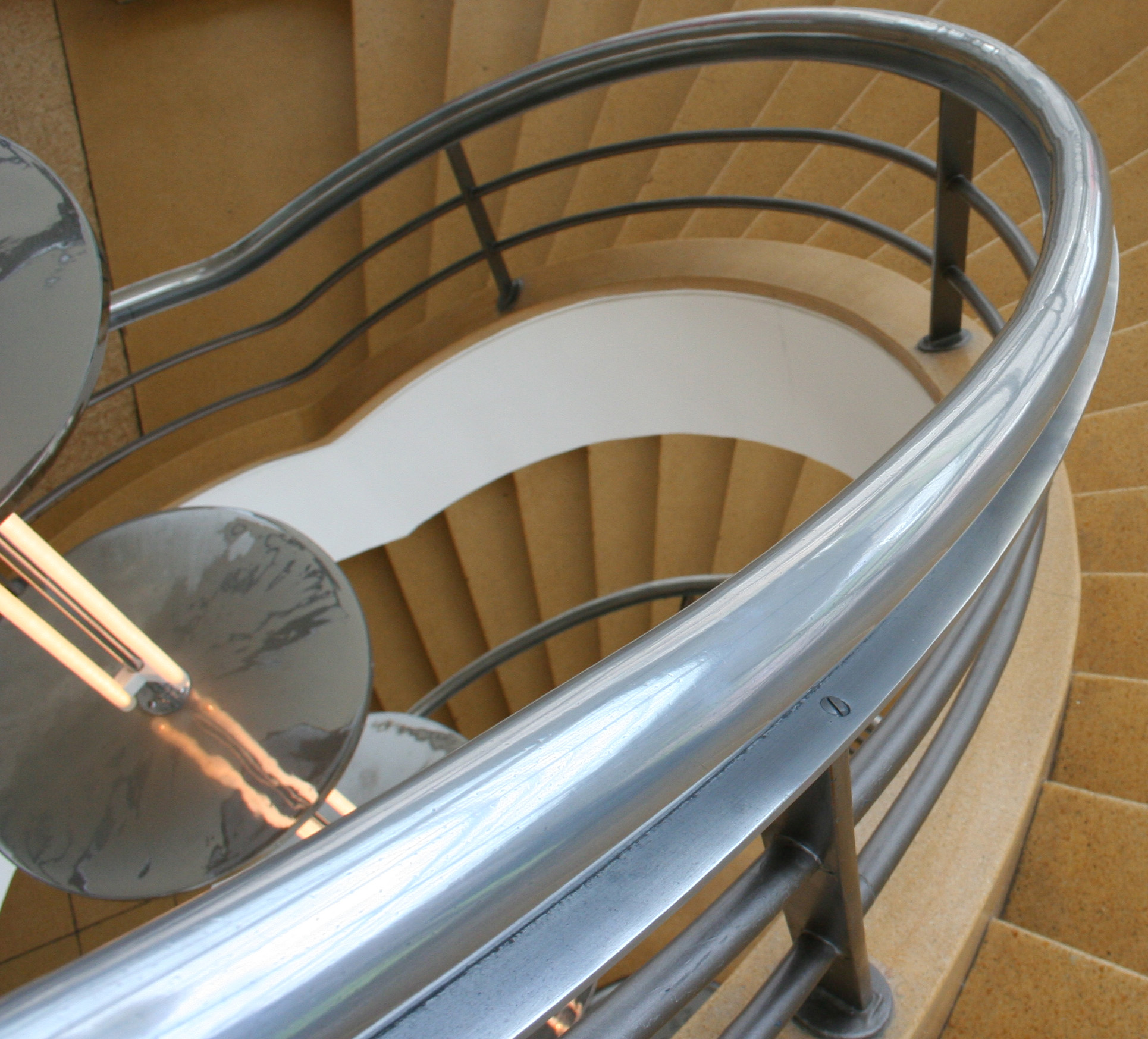
A stairwell in the pavilion

After the War, management of the pavilion was taken over by Bexhill Corporation (which later became Rother District Council). In the 1970s and 1980s, changes were made to the building, many of which were inconsistent with its original design and aesthetic. Lack of funds also resulted in an ongoing degradation of the building's fabric. It was used as a venue for indoor car boot sales and the exterior lost its original signage.

In 1986, the De La Warr Pavilion was granted a Grade I listed building status, essentially protecting the building from further inappropriate alteration. 1989 saw the formation of the Pavilion Trust, a group dedicated to protecting and restoring the building. Playwright David Hare notioned that the site be used as an art gallery as opposed to an expected privatised redevelopment. In 2002, after a long application process, the De La Warr Pavilion was granted £6 million by the Heritage Lottery Fund and the Arts Council of England, to restore the building and turn it into a contemporary arts centre. Work began in 2004 on the De La Warr Pavilion's regeneration and a transfer of the building's ownership from Rother District Council to the De La Warr Pavilion Charitable Trust. On 15 October 2005, after an 18-month long extensive programme of restoration, the De La Warr Pavilion officially reopened as a contemporary arts centre, encompassing one of the largest galleries on the south coast of England.

A small collection of archival materials related to the De La Warr Pavilion is collected in the Serge Chermayeff Papers held by the Avery Architectural and Fine Arts Library at Columbia University in New York City.

== Quotes ==
De La Warr Pavilion, January 2022

It is the intention of the promoters that the building should be simple in design, and suitable for a holiday resort in the south of England. Character in design can be obtained by the use of large window spaces, terraces and canopies. No restriction as to style of architecture will be imposed but buildings must be simple, light in appearance and attractive, suitable for a Holiday Resort. Heavy stonework is not desirable [...] Modern steel framed or ferro-cement construction may be adopted.

— The 9th Earl De La Warr on the specification for the De La Warr Pavilion

Delighted to hear that Bexhill has emerged from barbarism at last, but I shall not give it a clean bill of civilisation until all my plays are performed there once a year at least.

— George Bernard Shaw on hearing of the De La Warr Pavilion's opening

De La Warr Pavilion ... a fine modern building with absolutely no architectural merit at all. It was opened just in time to be bombed. The plane that dropped it was said to have been chartered by the Royal Institute of Architects, piloted by Sir Hugh Casson with John Betjeman as bomb aimer.

— Spike Milligan, from Adolf Hitler: My Part in His Downfall (1971)

== Directors ==
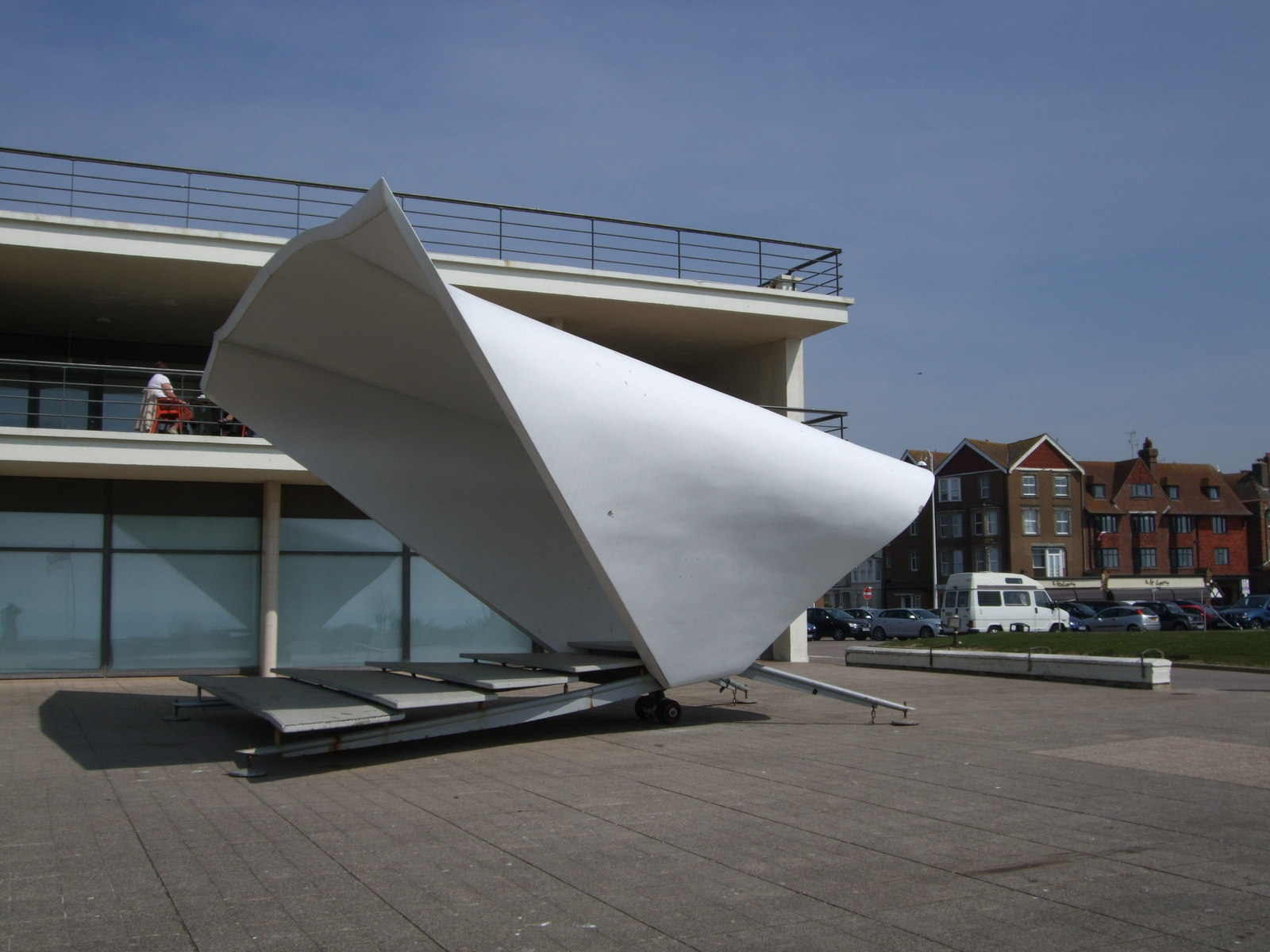
The bandstand, destroyed in 2022 by Storm Eunice

For Rother District Council

- (date needed)–1999: Caroline Collier
- 1999–2011: Alan Haydon

De La Warr Pavilion Charitable Trust

- 2003–2011: Alan Haydon
- 2011–present: Stewart Drew

== Honorary patrons ==
- President: Camilla, Duchess of Cornwall
- Earl and Countess De La Warr
- Eddie Izzard
- Jill Theis
- Richard Sykes
- Antony Gormley
- Ivan Chermayeff

== See also ==
- Saltdean Lido
- Embassy Court
