= Chermayeff & Geismar & Haviv =

American branding consulting firm

- Formerly: Brownjohn, Chermayeff & Geismar (1957–1959); Chermayeff & Geismar (1959–2006)
- Type: Partnership
- Industry: Corporate identity
- Founded: 1957; 69 years ago in New York City
- Founder: Robert Brownjohn, Tom Geismar and Ivan Chermayeff
- Headquarters: New York City, U.S.
- Key people: Tom Geismar (Founding Partner); Ivan Chermayeff (Founding Partner, 1957–2017); Robert Brownjohn (Founding Partner, 1957–1959); Sagi Haviv (Partner, 2003–); Mackey Saturday (Principal Designer, 2016–)
- Website: cghnyc.com

Chermayeff & Geismar & Haviv (formerly Brownjohn, Chermayeff & Geismar and Chermayeff & Geismar) is a New York-based branding and graphic design firm known for its work in corporate identity and logo design. Founded in 1957 by Robert Brownjohn, Tom Geismar, and Ivan Chermayeff, it is currently led by partners Tom Geismar and Sagi Haviv.

== About ==
Well-known logos designed by Chermayeff & Geismar & Haviv: (left to right, top to bottom) NBC, Mobil, Merck, Armani Exchange, Smithsonian Institution, PBS, Showtime, NYU, Barneys New York, Chase Bank, National Geographic, Univision

=== Brownjohn, Chermayeff & Geismar ===
The company was founded in 1957 by the two Yale graduates Ivan Chermayeff and Tom Geismar as well as Robert Brownjohn, an established freelance designer who was a protégé of László Moholy-Nagy and Chermayeff's father, industrial designer Serge Chermayeff, at the New Bauhaus in Chicago. In 1959, Brownjohn, who struggled with heroin addiction for most of his adult life, left the partnership to move to England and join J. Walter Thompson's London branch as creative director.

=== Chermayeff & Geismar ===
After Brownjohn's departure, Chermayeff and Geismar continued their partnership under the name Chermayeff & Geismar Associates. They focused on corporate identities and designed logotypes for such companies as Pan Am, Mobil Oil, PBS, Chase Bank, Barneys New York, The Museum of Modern Art, Xerox, Smithsonian Institution, NBC, Cornell University, National Geographic, and many others. Many of the company's projects from this time period are celebrated as revolutionary in the field of brand design.

In 1970s, Chermayeff & Geismar added Swiss graphic designer Steff Geissbuhler and architect John Grady as partners allowing the company to further broaden their services to include the design of interpretive exhibitions and environmental art installations, including the Ellis Island Immigration Museum, the Statue of Liberty Museum, exhibits at the New York Public Library, two World's Fair pavilions (the U.S. pavilions of 1967 and 1970), the Star-Spangled Banner exhibit at the Smithsonian National Museum of American History in Washington, D.C., and the red number 9 sculpture at 9 West 57th Street in Manhattan in New York City.

Ivan Chermayeff and Tom Geismar were awarded the AIGA Medal for lasting contributions to the field of visual literacy in 1979.

=== Chermayeff & Geismar & Haviv ===
In 2005 Chermayeff & Geismar significantly downsized the company to focus on logos and brand design like in the firm's early years. In 2006, designer Sagi Haviv became the third partner at the firm. In 2013 Haviv's name was added to the masthead and the firm became known as Chermayeff & Geismar & Haviv. Designer Mackey Saturday joined the firm as a principal in 2016.

In recent years, the firm created identities for America250, Warner Bros. Discovery, Inc., the New York City Marathon, Bechtel, Discovery, Inc.'s online streaming service Discovery+, the United States Olympic & Paralympic Museum, the US Open tennis tournament, the Culinary Institute of America, tech and electric car company Togg, fintech company Network Capital, esports brand Panda Global, Dick Wolf's Wolf Entertainment, Animal Planet, Impossible Aerospace, Hearst Corporation, the Southern Poverty Law Center, The John D. and Catherine T. MacArthur Foundation, Conservation International, the Women's Tennis Association, Harvard University Press, State Farm, Grupo Imagen TV (Mexico), L.A. Reid's Hitco Entertainment, Leonard Bernstein at 100, ClearMotion, Nanotronics, Flatiron Health and other institutions.

The firm also designed the Kennedy Center Honors medal and motion graphics, such as the titles for the Emmy Award-winning PBS documentary series Carrier and in 2009, a motion graphics display for Alicia Keys' annual fundraiser for her Keep a Child Alive Foundation.

In October 2014, Tom Geismar and Ivan Chermayeff were awarded the National Design Award for Lifetime Achievement by the Smithsonian's Cooper-Hewitt, National Design Museum. Chermayeff died on December 3, 2017, at the age of 85.

== Published books ==
In 2018, Ivan Chermayeff, Tom Geismar and Sagi Haviv co-authored Identity: Chermayeff & Geismar & Haviv. The book was published by Standards Manual (ISBN 0692955232).

In 2011, Ivan Chermayeff, Tom Geismar and Sagi Haviv co-authored the book Identify: Basic Principles of Identity Design in the Iconic Trademarks of Chermayeff & Geismar. The book was published by Print magazine's book imprint, (ISBN 978-1440310324).

== Logotypes designed ==
Chermayeff & Geismar logo design for Mobil (September 25, 1964)

Chermayeff & Geismar logo design for Screen Gems (1965–1974 as a TV studio; since 1999 as a motion picture label)

Chermayeff & Geismar logo design for Seatrain Lines (1966)

Chermayeff & Geismar logo design for National Geographic (1967)

Burlington Industries logo (1967)

Chermayeff & Geismar logo design for Xerox (1968-2008)

Chermayeff & Geismar logo design for Venture Stores (January 29, 1970 – July 28, 1991)

Chermayeff & Geismar logo design for Barneys New York (1973-)

Chermayeff & Geismar logo design for O-I Glass (November 21, 1973-)

Chermayeff & Geismar logo design for WGBH Educational Foundation (March 3, 1974 - September 1, 2020)

Chermayeff & Geismar logo design for PBS (September 30, 1984 – September 21, 1998)

Chermayeff & Geismar logo design for NBC (May 12, 1986 – September 13, 2011)

Chermayeff & Geismar logo design for Nissay (1987–)

Chermayeff & Geismar logo design for Univision (January 1, 1990 – December 31, 2012)

Chermayeff & Geismar logo design for Viacom (January 1, 1990 - December 31, 2005)

Chermayeff & Geismar logo design for Merck & Co. (February 29, 1992-)

Chermayeff & Geismar logo design for Sony Entertainment Television (1995–2007)

Chermayeff & Geismar logo design for Showtime (July 19, 1997)

Chermayeff & Geismar logo design for Smithsonian Institution (1998-)

Chermayeff & Geismar logo design for Shinsegae (2000)

Chermayeff & Geismar logo design for Chase Bank (May 9, 2005-)

Chermayeff & Geismar logo design for Women's Tennis Association (2010)

Chermayeff & Geismar logo design for State Farm (2011)

Chermayeff & Geismar & Haviv logo design for RatPac Entertainment (2013)

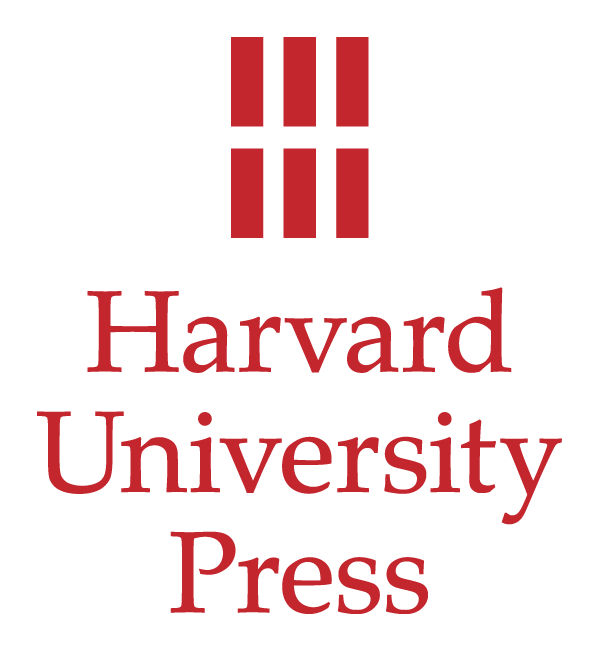
Chermayeff & Geismar & Haviv logo design for Harvard University Press (2013)

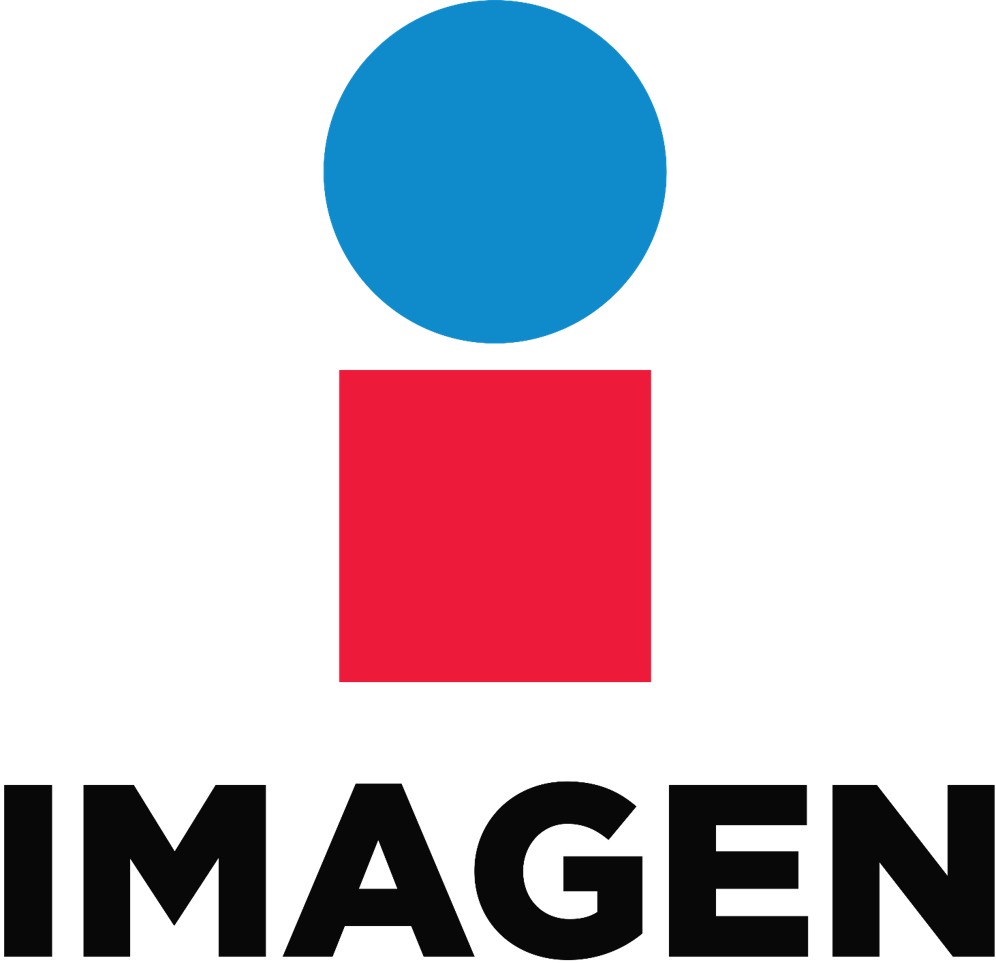
Chermayeff & Geismar & Haviv logo design for Grupo Imagen (2016-)

Chermayeff & Geismar & Haviv logo design for Beko (2017)

Chermayeff & Geismar & Haviv logo design for Dominion Energy (2017)

Chermayeff & Geismar & Haviv logo design for Animal Planet (October 16, 2018-)

Chermayeff & Geismar & Haviv logo design for Apollo Global Management (2018)

U.S. Open Tennis Championships (2018)

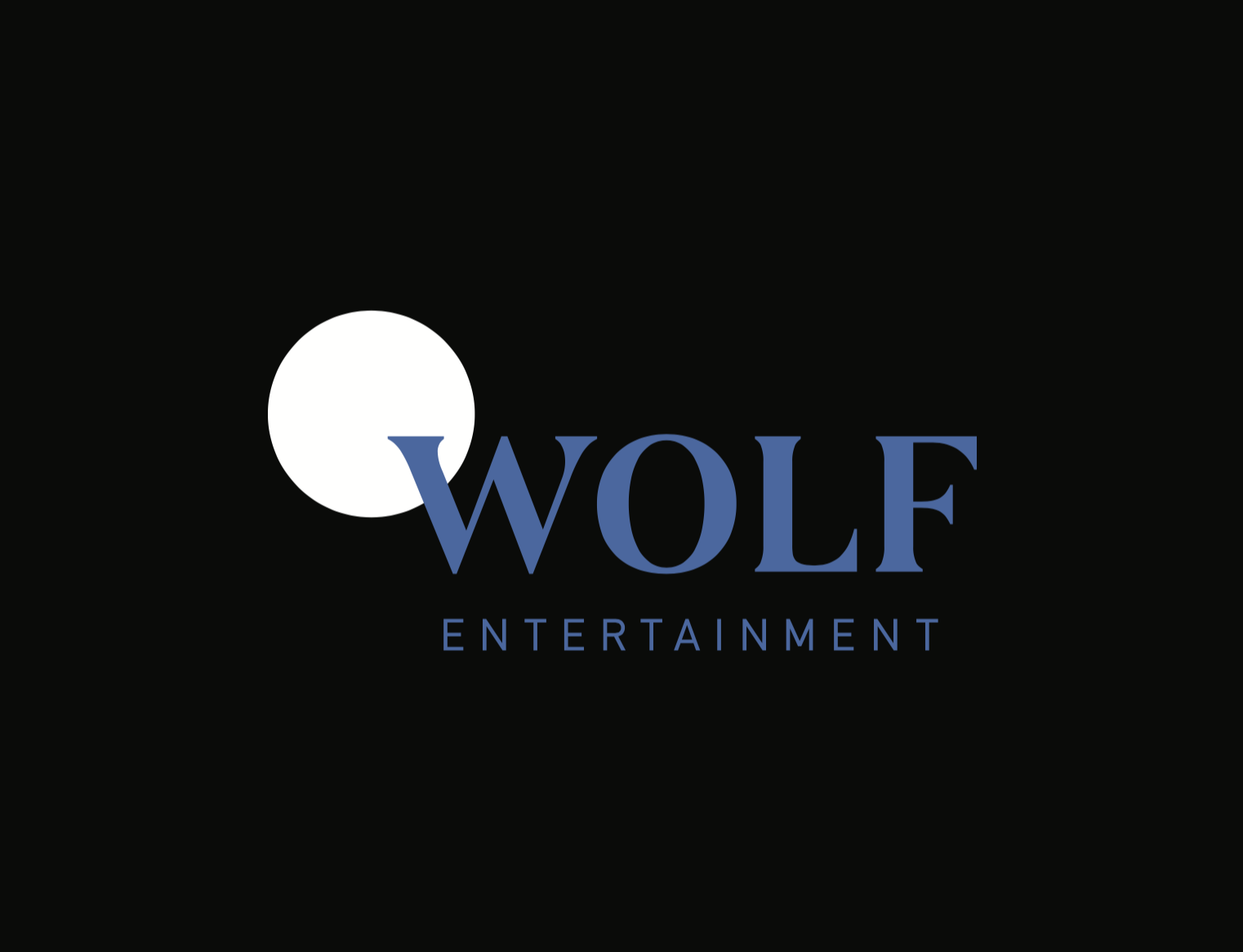
Chermayeff & Geismar & Haviv logo design for Wolf Entertainment (2019)

Chermayeff & Geismar & Haviv logo design for Discovery+ (January 4, 2021-)

logo for Togg electric car and tech company (2022)

Chermayeff & Geismar & Haviv logo design for Warner Bros. Discovery (April 8, 2022 – October 6, 2026)

Chermayeff & Geismar & Haviv logo design for Bechtel (February 2, 2023-)

Chermayeff & Geismar & Haviv logo design for Warner Bros. 100th anniversary (2023)

Chermayeff & Geismar & Haviv logo design for HLN (2023)

Chermayeff & Geismar & Haviv logo design for TNT Sports UK (2023)

Chermayeff & Geismar & Haviv logo design for Warner Bros. Entertainment and its division and subsidiaries (2023)

Chermayeff & Geismar & Haviv logo design for TNT Sports US (2023)

Chermayeff & Geismar & Haviv logo design for CNN Max (2023)

Chermayeff & Geismar & Haviv logo design for Warner Bros. Pictures Animation (June 9, 2023 – January 11, 2024)

Chermayeff & Geismar & Haviv logo design for America250 (December 4, 2023 – 2026)

Chermayeff & Geismar & Haviv logo design for Warner Bros. Pictures Animation (January 11, 2024-)

Chermayeff & Geismar & Haviv logo design for Warner Bros. as a sub-brand of Skydance (October 6, 2026-)

== See also ==
- List of AIGA medalists
- Peter Chermayeff LLC
