= Robert Brownjohn =

American graphic designer (1925–1970)

- Born: August 8, 1925; Newark, New Jersey, US
- Died: August 1, 1970 (aged 44); London, England
- Occupations: Graphic designer, title designer

Robert Brownjohn (August 8, 1925 – August 1, 1970) was an American graphic designer known for blending formal graphic design concepts with wit and 1960s pop culture. He is best known for his motion picture title sequences, especially From Russia with Love and Goldfinger.

== Early life ==
Brownjohn, nicknamed BJ, was born to British parents on August 8, 1925, in Newark, New Jersey, where his father was a bus driver. In 1937, at age 12, his father died. Despite the comparative disinclination of his family, Brownjohn showed early artistic promise. After attending the Pratt Institute in nearby Brooklyn, New York, for a year, he earned a place at the Institute of Design in Chicago, Illinois, formerly known as the New Bauhaus to study with its founder László Moholy-Nagy, in 1944.

Regarded as a prodigy by his peers, Brownjohn became a protégé of Moholy-Nagy and his successor, Serge Chermayeff; much of the structural quality in Brownjohn's graphic design can be traced to the former's important influence. In his spare time, he experimented with marijuana and heroin (culminating in an early rehabilitation stint at the behest of Chermayeff) and often frequented the city's jazz clubs with Chermayeff and Buckminster Fuller, then an Institute faculty member. Because of his proclivities, Brownjohn became intimately acquainted with Charlie Parker, Billie Holiday and other musicians of the era.

== Career ==
=== Early career ===
After receiving a nonprofessional B.A. in architecture in May 1948, Brownjohn initially worked as an architectural planner in Chicago before returning to the Institute of Design, which had been absorbed as a unit of the Illinois Institute of Technology in 1949, to assist Serge Chermayeff and teach his own courses in the school's evening division. He also worked as a freelance designer for several magazines, including Esquire and Coronet.

=== New York City ===
In 1951, Brownjohn returned to New York City in order to further his graphic design career. Continuing to work freelance for the next five years, he completed projects for a wide variety of clients, including Columbia Records. Brownjohn's effusive personality and fondness for jazz music allowed his friendships with Parker and Miles Davis, among others, to blossom as he became a part of the bohemian social scene in the city. Brownjohn also became addicted to heroin in earnest during this period. He was never to conquer this affliction and it contributed to his untimely death at the age of 44.

In 1956, Brownjohn married Donna Walters. The couple went on to have a daughter, Eliza. The following year, Brownjohn formed Brownjohn, Chermayeff & Geismar (BCG) with fellow designers Ivan Chermayeff (a son of Brownjohn's mentor) and Tom Geismar. BCG designed for print initially, producing experiments in typographical design as well as taking on commercial projects. Amongst the experimental work was the booklet, Watching Words Move, in which words were redesigned to suggest their meaning in graphical as well as literal terms, e.g. "+dd", "-tract" and "sexxx". In 1958 BCG won the commission to design the United States' stand at the Brussels World's Fair. BCG also counted the Pepsi-Cola Company amongst its largest clients at this time. In addition to designing the company magazine, it also created the widely hailed Christmas decorations for Pepsi's New York headquarters. During this period, he also taught advanced advertising design as an adjunct professor at Pratt and Cooper Union.

The end of 1959 saw the end of BCG. Brownjohn's drug use had escalated and he moved to London with his family in order, he hoped, to take advantage of the UK's more liberal attitude to drug use. Following Brownjohn's departure, the company, known as Chermayeff & Geismar & Haviv today, became known for its seminal corporate identity programs.

=== Move to London ===
As one of the most fêted and socially connected designers from New York, Brownjohn fitted into the Swinging London scene effortlessly. He initially worked at the J. Walter Thompson advertising agency before leaving the firm to join McCann Erickson in 1962. It was in this year that Donna left Brownjohn, taking daughter Eliza, and moved to Ibiza.

Brownjohn's career began to shift to working primarily with moving images. In 1963, the producers of the James Bond films approached Brownjohn after disagreements with film title designer Maurice Binder. Harry Saltzman asked Brownjohn to design the title sequence for the second James Bond film, From Russia with Love.

=== Movie title sequences ===
Robert Brownjohn's work on two James Bond title sequences, From Russia with Love and Goldfinger, is probably his most widely known achievement. In these he used the technique of projecting moving footage onto the bodies of models and filming the results. The idea of filming projections is one gleaned from the Bauhaus and was used by László Maholy-Nagy in his early constructivist films of the 1920s. The combination of this artistic technique with the style and glamour of the 1960s typify Brownjohn's work. The use of wit and risqué humour, for example the deliberate lining up of a projected shot of a golf putt so that the ball appears to roll down gold painted model Margaret Nolan's cleavage, are also classic Brownjohn devices.

Goldfinger's title design, photographed by David Watkin cost £5000. Brownjohn also designed the British posters for the film featuring Sean Connery and Honor Blackman over a gold painted Margaret Nolan. A second poster, featuring the characters in a golden hand, was designed for Ireland. Eventually Saltzman and Brownjohn fell out, and Brownjohn worked on no other Bond films.

In all, Robert Brownjohn designed four title sequences:

- From Russia with Love (1963)
- Goldfinger (1964)
- Where the Spies Are (1965)
- The Night of the Generals (1967)

=== Later career ===
The most notable work from Brownjohn's post-Bond career is the cover for the 1969 Rolling Stones album Let It Bleed. He also created moving graphics for Midland Bank and Pirelli between 1966 and 1970. His final piece of graphic design was a poster for the New York Peace Campaign in 1969: an ace of spades playing card is laid on a plain white background with the letters "PE" hastily scribbled to the left of it and a question mark to the right.

Brownjohn also had a supporting role as a fur coat-clad heavy in Dick Clement's film Otley.

Brownjohn died from a heart attack in London on August 1, 1970, a week shy of his 45th birthday. He was posthumously inducted into the Art Directors Club Hall of Fame in 1995 and awarded the AIGA Medal in 2002.

== See also ==
- List of AIGA medalists
