= Boris Pushkarev =

American urban planner and writer

Boris Pushkarev (1929 – May 19, 2026) was an urban planner and anti-communist activist. From 1961 to 1990 he was a research fellow at the Regional Plan Association (RPA) where his writings influenced public policy. While at the RPA, Pushkarev served as the planning director and the vice president for planning. His speciality was transportation planning, and he wrote many scholarly works regarding urban space for pedestrians, land use for public transit, regional rail expansion in cities, and airport planning.

He co-authored the urban planning book Man Made America: Chaos or Control? with Christopher Tunnard which was awarded the National Book Award in 1964 in the science, philosophy or religion category. Reviewing the book in the journal Technology and Culture, Carl W. Condit stated that the authors approached urban planning from the physical and societal needs of local communities (rather than using a preconceived overarching urban plan), which was a commendable approach.

After the fall of the Soviet Union in 1991, Pushkarev retired as an urban planner and moved to Moscow to become a writer. He wrote about 20th-century Russian history and communism. An ardent critic of communism, he was a board member of the anti-communist organization National Alliance of Russian Solidarists (abbreviated NTS in Russian) and the founding director of the Russian Research Foundation in 1981. The Solidarists were involved in various anti-Soviet activities such as broadcasting a pirate radio station in the Soviet States, launching airborne balloon leaflet drops, and smuggling tamizdat (banned books) into the Soviet Union. In the 1990s, after the fall of the Soviet Union, the NTS had moved from the underground to become a recognized organization in the Russian Federation. His anti-communist writings, dating from 1970 to 2015, but primarily from the 1980s to 2000s, are housed at the Hoover Institution.

Pushkarev was born in Prague, Czechoslovakia and immigrated to the United States in the 1940s. His parents were from the Soviet Union and fled the country in the 1920s. Pushkarev held degrees in architecture and city planning from Yale University. He was married to Iraida Vandellos until her death in 2020.
