= June Leaf =

American artist (1929–2024)

- Leaf in the early 1990s
- Born: August 4, 1929; Chicago, Illinois, U.S.
- Died: July 1, 2024 (aged 94); New York City, New York, U.S.
- Education: Roosevelt University (BA); Illinois Institute of Technology (MA)
- Years active: 1949–2024
- Spouse(s): Joel Press (divorced) Robert Frank (m. 1975; died 2019)

June Leaf (August 4, 1929 – July 1, 2024) was an American visual artist known for her abstract allegorical paintings and drawings; she also worked in modernist kinetic sculpture. She was based in New York City, on Bleecker Street in NoHo, and Mabou, Nova Scotia.

== Biography ==
June Leaf was born on August 4, 1929, in Chicago, Illinois, to Ruth (Ettleson) Leaf and Phillip Leaf. She studied ballet and created sculptures, then was enrolled for three months between 1947 and 1948 at the Institute of Design at the Illinois Institute of Technology (formerly known as the New Bauhaus), taking classes with artist Hugo Weber. She left school and traveled to Paris in 1948, focusing on creating and identifying abstraction and patterns in her work.

In 1954, she returned to the school for her B.A. degree in Art Education from Roosevelt University and the same year her M.A. degree in Art Education at Institute of Design.

Leaf returned to Paris in 1958–1959 with a Fulbright Grant for painting. When she returned, she moved to New York City in 1960.

In 1970, Leaf purchased a home on Cape Breton's western coast in Mabou, where she also built a studio.

She married filmmaker and photographer, Robert Frank in 1975.

In 2016, the Whitney Museum of American Art held the retrospective exhibition "June Leaf: Thought Is Infinite." In the same year, another retrospective was held at the Edward Thorp Gallery in New York, entitled "June Leaf: A Survey, 1949-Present".

Her work is included in many permanent art collections, including the Smithsonian American Art Museum, the Art Institute of Chicago, Museum of Contemporary Art Chicago, Museum of Modern Art (MoMA), and the Minneapolis Institute of Art.

June Leaf died from gastric cancer in Manhattan, on July 1, 2024, at the age of 94.

== Works ==
=== Coney Island (1968) ===
Executed in pen and ink and colored pencil on paper, the work measures 14 by 16 7/8 inches (36 cm × 43 cm). The drawing depicts a middle-aged couple looking at an amusement park carousel. Unlike some of Leaf's other works, it does not include surreal or fantastical imagery and instead presents a scene grounded in everyday subject matter.

=== The Girl with the Hoop (1980) ===
Created with acrylic and fiber-tipped pen on paper, 8 1/2 × 11 in (21.6 × 27.9 cm). A relatively simple graphite and ink drawing from 2013 of the artist "threading" her eyes with her fingers found Leaf literally drawing a line out of her brain/vision. The sheet revisits a motif developed in Threading the Story through the Eye of a Needle from 1974, in which a hand encapsulates an imagined scene seemingly pulled forth—threaded through—the eye of its creator. The hand joins the head explicitly in these images. Leaf's representations and interpretations of thought as "infinite" seem to be her meditations on imagination's expression in the physical world through the artist's corporeality: ruminations on the creative process. The subject of how the mind's contents become manifest through the artist's hand is addressed further in a series of works representing substances that issue forth from the brain in various ways.

=== Making # 2 (2014–2015) ===
Artist made sewing treadle, wire, copper, thread, 11 1/2 by 22 by 19 1/2 inches (29 cm × 56 cm × 50 cm). Making #2 includes the sewing machine base. It is entirely fabricated and features a dancing figure, delicately rendered as a wire line drawing within a circular arc that vibrates when the treadle is worked or the wheel connected to it is turned. Leaf possessed made many devices with triggers or other parts that activate little figures. These evoked the mechanics of 19th-century hands-on mechanical animations.

== Awards ==
Leaf was awarded an Honorary Doctorate, Humane Letters in 1984 from DePaul University and in 1996 from Nova Scotia College of Art and Design (NSCAD). She received many awards including the Distinguished Artists Awards from the Canadian Council in 1984 and a National Endowment for the Arts (NEA) grant in painting in 1989.

== Bibliography ==
- Enright, Robert, June Leaf. Benteli, 2006. ISBN 3716513733
- Leaf, June, Record 1974/1975. Göttingen: Steidl, 2010. ISBN 9783869300511.
- Leaf, June, Thought Is Infinite. Göttingen: Steidl, 2016. ISBN 3958291023
