= Institute of Design at the Illinois Institute of Technology =

Private graduate school in Illinois, US

Coordinates: 41°52′44.3″N 87°38′31.6″W

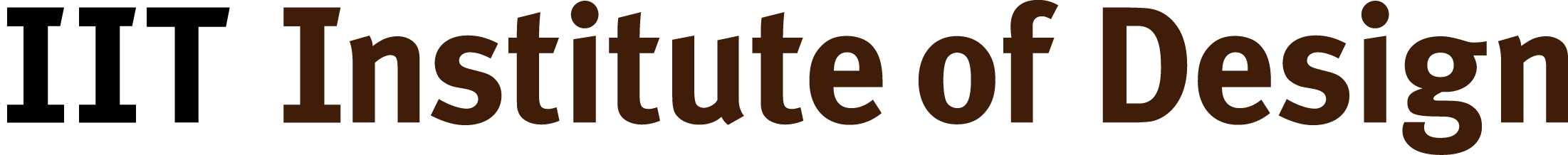
- Established: 1937
- Founder: László Moholy-Nagy
- Dean: Anijo Mathew
- Location: Chicago, Illinois, United States
- Campus: Main campus
- Nickname: ID
- Website: id.iit.edu

The Institute of Design (ID) is a graduate school of the Illinois Institute of Technology (IIT), a private university in Chicago, Illinois, United States. The Institute of Design was founded in 1937 as The New Bauhaus by László Moholy-Nagy, a Bauhaus teacher (taught: 1923–1928). This school is a direct American descendant of the German Bauhaus.

The school focuses on systemic and human-centered design with the following graduate-level degree programs:

- Master of Design (MDes)
- Master of Design + MBA (MDes + MBA)
- Master of Design & Master of Public Administration (MDes + MPA)
- Master of Science in Strategic Design Leadership (MS-SDL), formerly Master of Design Methods (MDM)
- PhD in Design

== History ==
After a spell in London, Bauhaus master László Moholy-Nagy, at the invitation of Chicago's Association of Art and Industry, moved to Chicago in 1937 to start a new design school, which he named The New Bauhaus. The philosophy of the school was basically unchanged from that of the original German Bauhaus, and its first headquarters was the Prairie Avenue mansion that architect Richard Morris Hunt designed for department store magnate Marshall Field.

Due to financial problems the school briefly closed in 1938. However, Walter Paepcke, Chairman of the Container Corporation of America and an early champion of industrial design in America, soon offered his personal support, and in 1939, Moholy-Nagy re-opened the school as the Chicago School of Design. In 1944, this became the Institute of Design, and in 1949 it became part of the new Illinois Institute of Technology university system and also the first institution in the United States to offer a PhD in design.

Moholy authored an account of his efforts to develop the curriculum of the School of Design in his book Vision in Motion.

Archival materials are held by the Ryerson & Burnham Libraries at the Art Institute of Chicago. The Institute of Design Collection includes articles, letters, photographs, and other materials documenting the institute's history and works by faculty and students. Select archival film materials are held at Chicago Film Archives, who store and provide access to a handful of Institute of Design films.

== Educational programs ==
The Institute of Design offers two professional degrees, the Master of Design (MDes) and the Master of Design Methods (MDM), as well as a research degree, the PhD, which was the first doctoral program in design in the United States, a MDes/MPA program, and a dual MDes/MBA degree program, also the first of its kind, with the IIT Stuart School of Business.

At one time, the Institute of Design offered a Bachelor of Science in Design degree, with specialties in Photography, Product Design and Communication Design. The Bachelor's program was halted in 1998.

== Conferences ==
The Institute of Design formerly organized two large design conferences in the Chicago area: The Strategy Conference for international executives and designers who come together to address how businesses can use design to explore emerging opportunities, and the Design Research Conference, organized by students, exploring emerging trends in design research.

== Directors ==
- 1937–1945: László Moholy-Nagy
- 1946–1951: Serge Chermayeff
- 1951–1955: Crombie Taylor (acting)
- 1955–1969: Jay Doblin
- 1969–1974: James S. Montague (acting)
- 1974–1982: various
- 1982–1986: Dale Fahnstrom
- 1986–2017: Patrick Whitney
- 2017–2022: Denis Weil
- 2023–present: Anijo Mathew

== Prominent former faculty ==
- George Anselevicius (1949–1952)
- Alexander Archipenko
- John Cage
- Harry Callahan, Photography (1947–1961)
- Patty Carroll, photographer (taught there from 1977 to 1992; received an MFA from the Institute of Design in 1972)
- Jay Doblin, Director (1954–1968)
- Buckminster Fuller
- Michael Higgins, Head of Visual Design
- George Fred Keck
- György Kepes
- Michael McCoy and Katherine McCoy (1995–2003)
- Sharon Poggenpohl Professor and coordinator the PhD program (1987-2013)
- Ralph Rapson (1942–1946)
- Arthur Siegel, Photography (1946–1949 and 1967–1977)
- Aaron Siskind, Photography (1951–1971)
- Robert Bruce Tague, Architecture
- Konrad Wachsmann, Advanced Building Research (Director) (1950-1964)
- Hugo Weber (1949- 1955)
- Massimo Vignelli (1958–1960)

== Former names and locations ==
New Bauhaus – American School of Design

- 1938: 1905 S. Prairie Avenue, Chicago

The School of Design in Chicago

- 1939–1945: 247 E. Ontario Street, Chicago

The Institute of Design (ID) at Illinois Tech

- 1945–1946: 1009 N. State Street, Chicago
- 1946–1956: 632 N. Dearborn Street, Chicago
- 1956–1989: S.R. Crown Hall IIT campus on South State Street
- 1989–1996: 10 West 35th Street (ITRI on IIT campus)
- 1996–2016: 350 N. LaSalle Blvd, Chicago
- 2016-2018: 565 W. Adams St, Chicago
- 2018–Present: Kaplan Institute, 3137 S Federal St., Chicago

== Prominent alumni ==
- Robert Brownjohn, artist and graphic designer
- Ivan Chermayeff, Principal of Chermayeff & Geismar, son of former Institute of Design director Serge Chermayeff and designer of the Chase Manhattan Bank logo among other achievements
- Linda Connor, photography
- Burton Kramer, graphic designer, artist, A.G.I., Order of Ontario, D.Des (Hon) O.C.A.D.U.
- June Leaf, (attended 1947-1948, M.A. Art Education in 1954) painter, sculptor
- Estes W. Mann (Armour Institute), Memphis based architect who produced numerous NRHP listed residences
- Kenneth Josephson, photographer
- Ray Metzker, photographer
- Richard Nickel, photographer and architectural preservationist
- Louis Sauer (attended 1949 to 1953), architect
- Art Sinsabaugh, (B.A. 1949, M.S. 1967) American photographer; founded and led the photography/cinematography department, University of Illinois, Urbana-Champaign, 1959–83; founding member, Society for Photographic Education
- Roger Sweet (MS 1960), Toy inventor and creator of He-Man from Mattel
- Madeline Tourtelot, artist, founder of the Peninsula School of Art
- John Henry Waddell, sculptor
- Claire Zeisler, fiber artist

== See also ==
- Illinois Institute of Technology School of Architecture
- Ludwig Mies van der Rohe
- The New Bauhaus, a documentary film about László Moholy-Nagy, directed by Alysa Nahmias (2019).
