= Steff Geissbühler =

Swiss graphic designer (born 1942)

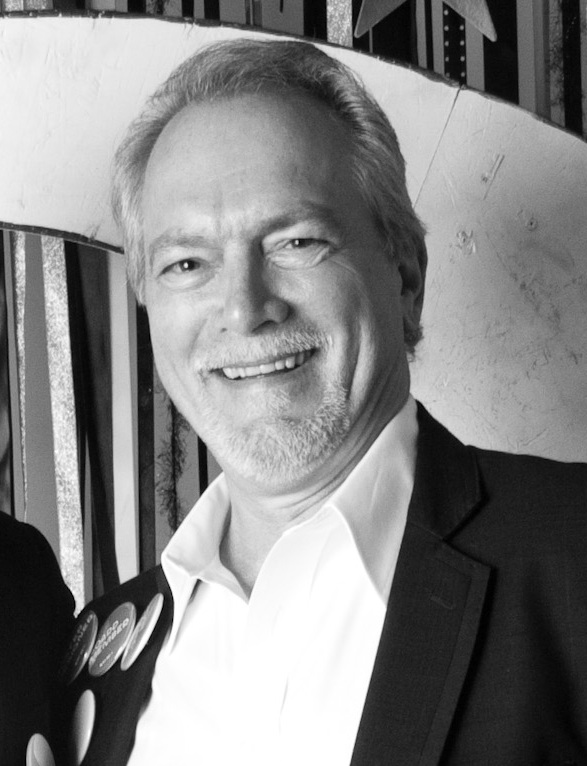
Geissbühler in 2012

Steff Geissbühler (born 1942) is a Swiss graphic designer based in the United States. He is well known for designing NBC's modern peacock logo (1986) and EPA's logo and graphics standards manual (1977) while at Chermayeff & Geismar. Geissbühler received the American Institute of Graphic Arts medal in 2005.

== Early life ==
Geissbühler was born in 1942 in Zofingen, Switzerland. He attended Basel School of Design, studying under Emil Ruder and Armin Hofmann. His first job was as graphic designer at Basel pharmaceutical company J.R. Geigy.

== Career ==
Geissbühler moved to the United States in 1967 to teach at Philadelphia College of Art, where he served as chair of the design department between 1973 and 1975. He was invited to join Chermayeff & Geismar in New York as associate in 1975. He was promoted to a partner of the firm in 1977. In 2005, he co-founded design agency C&G Partners. Geissbühler taught graphic design at Savannah College of Art and Design and Cooper Union.

== See also ==
- List of AIGA medalists
- Chermayeff & Geismar & Haviv
