= Marcel Gimond =

French sculptor

Marcel Antoine Gimond (1894–1961) was a French sculptor known for his busts, statues, and portraits in bronze.

== Biography ==
Gimond was born in the Ardèche region of France. He first studied at the Beaux-Arts Academy in Lyon and was the student in turn of both Aristide Maillol and Auguste Rodin. Gimond was an influential Professor at the Paris École nationale supérieure des Beaux-Arts until 1960. He was uniquely invited to exhibit his modeled busts at both the Paris salon and with the surrealists.

Awarded the Grand Prix National des Arts in 1957, Gimond, the son of a metalworker, is widely considered France's last great portraitist and bust sculptor. Possessing a vast knowledge of sculpture, Gimond was celebrated for a purified style that captured the permanence of form beneath his subjects' individuality.

Marcel Gimond maintained a concise critique of sculpture, and taught that monumentality in sculpture was universal throughout the civilizations of the world, in recognition of the varied sculptural achievements of Egyptian, Khmer, Sumerian or pre-Columbian art; holding that "Art is a language, the sole which has the privilege to be universal, and which, across frontiers, can unite all that which is not alien to humanity."

Gimond is known for his many heads and portraits of political and artistic figures and his distinctive bronze busts and these are to be seen in numerous museums in France, Luxembourg, and in the National Portrait Gallery, London.

Gimond's students include artists William McVey and Hugo Weber.
