= John Tunnard =

English artist and activist

John Tunnard ARA
- Born: John Samuel Tunnard; 7 May 1900; Sandy, Bedfordshire, England
- Died: 12 December 1971 (aged 71); Penzance, Cornwall, England
- Resting place: St Senara's Church, Zennor, Cornwall, England
- Known for: Design, painting
- Movement: Modernism
- Spouse: Mary May Robertson (m. 1926)
- Relatives: Christopher Tunnard (cousin)

John Samuel Tunnard ARA (7 May 1900 – 12 December 1971) was an English modernist designer and abstract painter, and anti-hunting activist. He was the cousin of landscape architect Christopher Tunnard.

== Life ==
Tunnard was born in Sandy, Bedfordshire, and educated at Charterhouse School. He studied design at the Royal College of Art (1919–1923). In 1926, he married a fellow student, Mary May Robertson.

During the 1920s he worked in various textile design jobs in Manchester — for Tootal, Broadhurst, Lee & Co, the carpet manufacturers, H&M Southwell, and John Lewis Partnership. He took up painting seriously in 1928, and taught design at the Central School of Arts and Crafts, London, from 1929.

In 1931 he exhibited at the Royal Academy and with The London Group, which he joined in 1934. In 1933 the Tunnards moved to Cadgwith, Cornwall, where they ran a business making printed silks. From the mid-1930s, he became friends with Julian Trevelyan, Henry Moore, John Betjeman and Humphrey Spender.

During World War II he considered himself a conscientious objector, although, as no man born earlier than 1 July 1900 was required for call-up, an occasion for formally registering his objection never arose. Nevertheless, feeling morally obliged to make a contribution, he worked briefly as a fisherman in 1939, then as an auxiliary coastguard for the duration of the war.

Tunnard was an opponent of hunting and in 1935 authored Slaughter of Beauty: Otter Hunting, published by the National Society for the Abolition of Cruel Sports.

In 1942, he was described as "one of the leading abstract painters of today". From 1945 to 1965 he taught at the Penzance School of Art. He exhibited again at the Royal Academy in 1960, and was elected as an Associate in 1967. He died in Penzance in 1971.

== Work ==
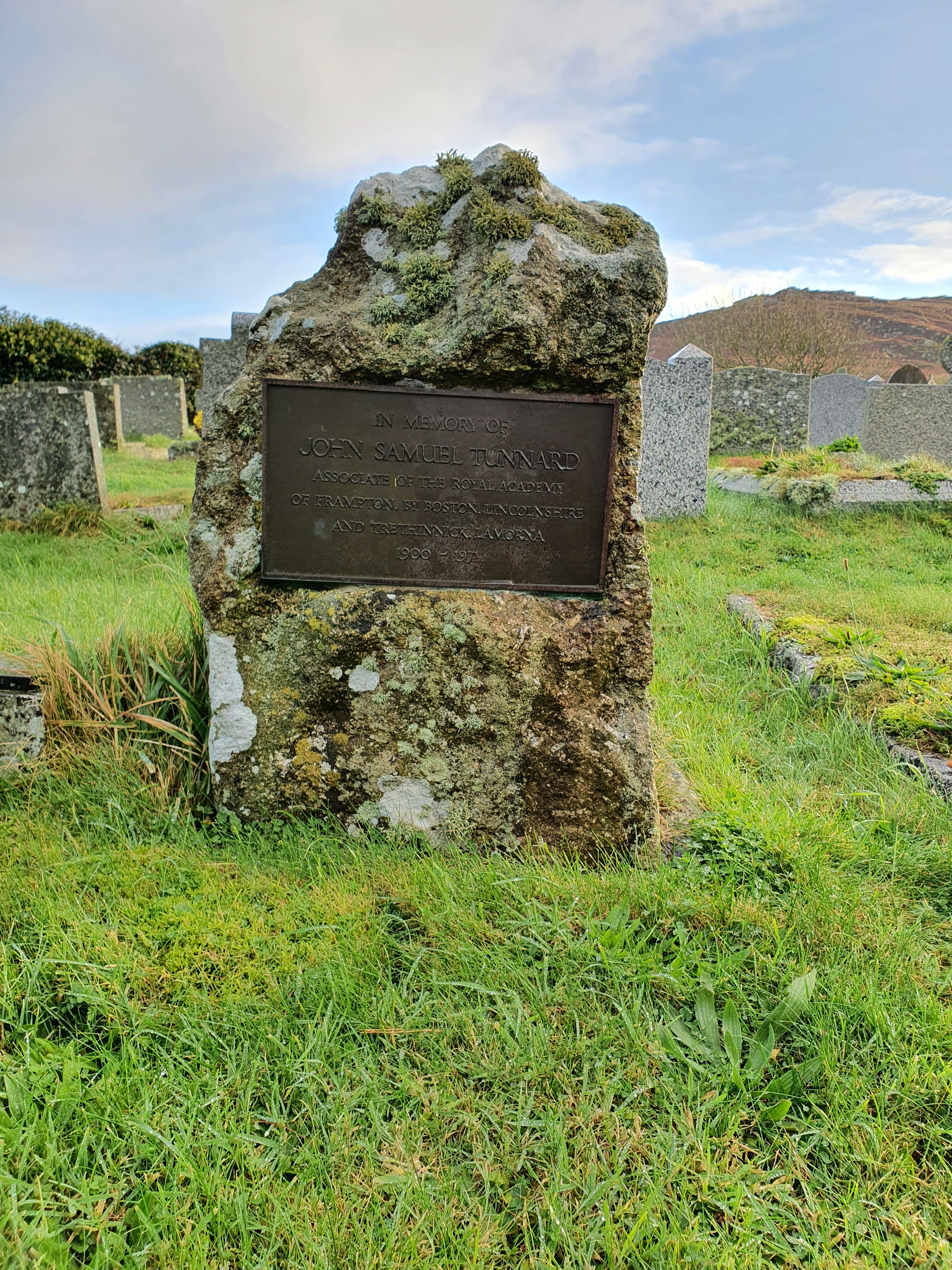
Tunnard's gravestone at St Senara's Churchyard

Tunnard's early works were considered fairly conventional. His first major exhibition, held in 1932 at the Redfern Gallery, featured landscapes, marine scenes and still life. From the mid-1930s, however, he began to paint abstract works influenced by the styles of Joan Miró and Paul Klee, and further embraced British surrealism on reading Herbert Read's Surrealism. His works featured architectural and biomorphic forms combined with elements of constructivism. In his Self Portrait, now in the National Portrait Gallery (London), the artist depicts himself alongside an oversized insect.

Tunnard was given a show at the Guggenheim Jeune gallery in 1938. In her autobiography, Peggy Guggenheim says that "His color was exquisite and his construction magnificent" and that "I was happy to think that I had discovered a genius." She purchased a large work from the exhibition titled PSI which is in the Guggenheim Collection in Venice.

Tunnard's work, along with that of painter Graham Sutherland, was loosely termed British Neo-romanticism, continuing the tradition of British landscape, but with a modern sensibility. In later life he became interested in space travel and entomology, when he depicted satellites and moonscapes in his paintings.

Interest in his work diminished after his death in 1971. In 2000, there was a centenary exhibition at Durham University facilitated by Professor Brian Whitton (1935-2025), a major collector of Tunnard's art.

A major retrospective at Pallant House Gallery in Chichester in Spring 2010 entitled 'John Tunnard: Inner Space to Outer Space', explored the themes of abstraction, music and surrealism, nature and landscape, and science and space travel in his work. The exhibition was curated by Simon Martin.

== Selected publications ==
- Slaughter of Beauty: Otter Hunting (1935)
