= Sharon Poggenpohl =

- Occupations: Scholar and editor

Sharon Helmer Poggenpohl is a graphic designer,design scholar, educator and author. She was the editor and publisher of the interdisciplinary journal Visible Language.

== Education and career ==
Poggenpohl obtained an BS Design from the Institute of Design at Illinois Institute of Technology (IIT) in 1965, and MS Design there in 1972, and first taught there. Later she taught at the University of Kansas, Rhode Island School of Design, and the Rochester institute of Technology. From 1993 to 2006, she was a full professor, coordinating the PhD in design program of the Institute of Design at Illinois Institute of Technology (IIT) She was the editor and publisher of the scholarly journal Visual Language for over 20 years. She went on to develop an Interaction Design program at Hong Kong Polytechnic University.

Poggenpohl is known for her work to develop “Interaction Design” and graduate studies in design, through the edition of anthology and the publications of essays. These include the book Design Integrations.
