= Christopher Tunnard =

Canadian-born landscape architect (1910–1979)

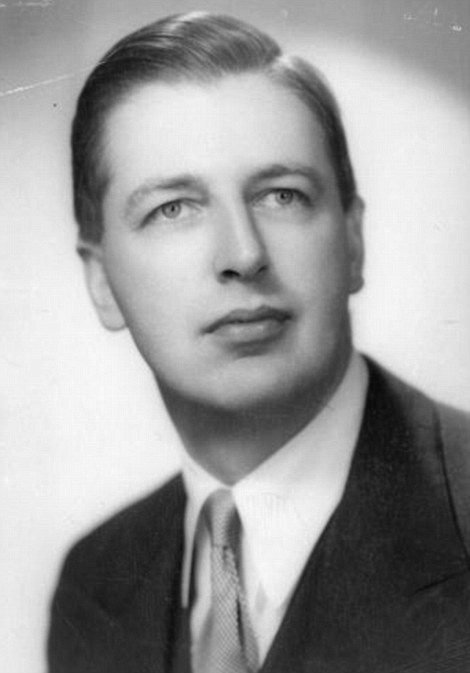
- Born: Arthur Coney Tunnard; July 7, 1910; Victoria, British Columbia, Canada
- Died: February 13, 1979 (aged 68); New Haven, Connecticut, U.S.
- Resting place: Oak Grove Cemetery, Plymouth, Plymouth County, Massachusetts, U.S.
- Education: Westminster School of Art, Royal Horticultural Society

Arthur Coney Tunnard (1910 in Victoria, British Columbia – 1979), later known as Christopher Tunnard, was a Canadian-born landscape architect, garden designer, city-planner, and author of Gardens in the Modern Landscape (1938).

== Biography ==
Christopher Tunnard was the son of Christopher Coney Tunnard, second son of Charles Thomas Tunnard of Frampton House, near Boston, Lincolnshire (now a Residential care home) and Madeline Kingscote. He had one younger brother, Peter Kingscote Tunnard (b. 11 December 1919, d. 16 March 1940), who died at age 20. Tunnard's uncle was John Charles Tunnard (b. 1873) whose only son was British surrealist artist John Tunnard (1900–1971). Another uncle was Thomas Monkton Tunnard (b. 1882) of Birtles Hall, vicar of Over Alderley, who married Grace Cook and fathered pianist Viola Mary Tunnard (1916–1974), organist and choirmaster Thomas Newburgh Tunnard (1918–2012) and gallery owner Peter Humphrey Tunnard (b. 1920).

Born and educated in Victoria, British Columbia, where his Lincolnshire-born father had moved as a young man, in 1929 Christopher Tunnard went to England and obtained a Diploma from the Royal Horticultural Society in 1930.

From 1932–1935, he worked as a garden designer for Percy Cane, an exponent of the Arts and Crafts movement. He then embarked on a European tour, becoming interested in avant-garde art and architecture. In 1936, he started his own practice for landscape architecture in London.

His noted landscape projects include his landscape architecture for Serge Chermayeff's house Bentley Wood at Halland, Sussex; and for his modification of existing 18th-century gardens at the circular Art Deco St Ann's Court (a Grade II* Listed Building) in Chertsey designed by Raymond McGrath, where Tunnard lived for a short time with his then partner, the stockbroker GL Schlesinger.

He wrote a series of articles for the Architectural Review, later re-published as a manifesto, Gardens in the Modern Landscape. In 1939, he designed the garden for the "All-Europe House" at the Ideal Home Exhibition, Earls Court. In the same year he emigrated to America, at the invitation of Walter Gropius, to teach at the Harvard Graduate School of Design. From 1938 to 1943, Tunnard taught at Harvard. While in Massachusetts, he designed several gardens for modern houses, photos and/or drawings of which he later published in the second edition of his book in 1948. Among them were a small courtyard garden for the Koch House in Cambridge by Edward D. Stone and Carl Koch; planning with Koch the early modern residential development at Snake Hill Road in Belmont; and a garden for an expansive rural site in Lincoln with a new house by architect G. Holmes Perkins, who was on the Harvard faculty with Tunnard.

During the 1943/44 academic year, Tunnard lived in the Greenwich Village with his mother Madeline Kingscote. Madeline had moved to New York City to be near her other son, Peter Kingscote, who was with the Michael Chekhov's Theatre Studio at Ridgefield, CT, 40 miles away. Peter was an aspiring poet and short stories writer, but his career was cut short when he died just 20 years old in mid-1940.

Christopher Tunnard was drafted into the Royal Canadian Air Force in 1943 and after the war took a job teaching city planning at Yale. Enjoying the work, he did little further garden design, and reached the post of professor and chairman of the department of city planning. His publications in this area include articles such as America's super-cities and a number of books on city design in the U.S. The best known may be Man-made America: Chaos or Control? (1963), by Tunnard and Boris Pushkarev, which won the 1964 National Book Award in Science, Philosophy and Religion.

In 1969, Yale disciplined him by demotion for sending out unauthorized admission letters to prospective students, following an unresolved departmental dispute.

== Landscape architecture and garden design ==
One of Tunnard's main projects was Chermayeff's Bentley Wood in Halland Sussex in 1928. This project was shown in Architectural Review and his book Gardens in the Modern Landscape. In describing the gardens surrounding the building, Tunnard refers to them as to being in perfect harmony. The thinning of the trees left shaded lawn that gradually led up to the house and left room for daffodils and evergreens. It is not a formal garden. The trees are formed in relation to the house in groups or by themselves. This is a concept that Tunnard describes as "letting space flow by breaking down division between usable areas and incidentally increasing their usability."

Another of Tunnard's projects was at Galby Leicestershire House, in collaboration with architect Raymond McGrath. The building materials for the house were chosen to fit in with the scenery. For example, some remnants of the former great estates of Beaudesert were used to build the new building. In addition, Tunnard wanted the garden to be interpreted as a link between the house and the open landscape, not merely as a formal garden.

== Design philosophy ==
Tunnard came to England in a period when garden design was strongly influenced by the work of Edwin Lutyens, Gertrude Jekyll and Mackay Hugh Baillie Scott. The eclectic Arts and Crafts movement was drawing on this background to focus on garden features such as crazy paving, pergolas, sundials, sunken pools and statuary.

Tunnard viewed this as "romantic trivialisation" of garden design and in reaction spearheaded a Modernist approach to landscape design, which he expressed in the polemical Gardens in the Modern Landscape. His approach avoided decoration, sentimentality and classical allusion in favour of functional minimalist designs. For instance, his acclaimed landscape for Chermayeff's Bentley Wood house, itself Modernist, simply thinned the surrounding woodland and replanted areas with drifts of daffodils. His writings influenced a further generation of designers such as Thomas Dolliver Church.

== Gardens in the Modern Landscape ==
First published as a series of articles in Architectural Review from October 1937 to September 1938, Gardens in the Modern Landscape significantly challenged the then current views of landscape architecture.

Geoffrey Jellicoe reviewed Gardens in the Modern Landscape in the magazine Architecture Review and overall gave a great praise to Tunnard's work. As it debunks previous and most accepted styles of landscape architecture, Tunnard meets with new nature, and questioning and breaking apart most widely accepted conventions, such as symmetry and the containment of the garden to a picture. He described the book as "if you can take the jolts you will be pleasantly introduced to the brave new world of landscape," referring the jolts as this challenge to current conventions. In sum, Jellicoe reviews the new landscape that Tunnard describes as having a response from readers as either "shocked from it altogether, or carried off their feet with enthusiasm."

Garrett Eckbo, Dan Kiley and James Rose, while together at the Graduate School of Design at Harvard during 1936 to 1938, cite reading Gardens in the Modern Landscape as inspiration against the strict rules of the curriculum of the GSD and a major influence for their work. Walker, Peter, and Melanie Simo.

Lawrence Halprin cites Gardens in the Modern Landscape as a revelation for him and his future career. From the book, the most enduring idea for Halprin being "A garden is a work of art, and it remains a vision for guidance as one tries to extend the garden’s benefits of rest, recreation, and aesethic pleasure to a wider public, in the larger landscape." Walker 150 Moreover, Halprin wanted to study under Tunnard. For his graduate studies, he went to the GSD at Harvard and under Tunnard and other influential men, Halprin studied landscape architecture. Later, with Tunnard, Halprin produced an issue of Task magazine. Walker, Peter, and Melanie Simo.

== The functional garden ==
Functionalism derives from a doctrine of "fit for purpose." Is the object made fit its purpose? From this arises a more simple and clear way of planning, and not embellished with materials or things not fit for the purpose. For Tunnad, the creation of modern houses lacked modern surroundings, which he wanted to create. Flowers are not created to just be created but to be enjoyed by children. Gardens are not necessarily symmetrical because there is no need outside of simply being symmetrical. Tunnard cites the Swedish Garden Architect's Associations’ paper as describing this new garden as

paths and walks are reduced to the minimum and often consist only of stepping stones between which grass or creeping plants are allowed to grow, thus conserving a homogeneity between the unites of the plan. Trees are not numerous in these gardens; most people prefer to have flowering shrubs.

The styles, axial and symmetrical planning, ostentatious decoration- all this rhetoric has been discarded to make way for simple statement. That which is necessary is such a planning system automatically become that which is good and the need for space filling or accentuating decoration disappears. The designer thus confines decoration to the integers of the plan, whose functions will determine their forms.

The functional garden avoids the extremes both of the sentimental expressionism of the wild garden and the intellectual classicism of the "formal" garden; it embodies rather a spirit of rationalism and through an aesthetic and practical ordering of its units provides a friendly and hospitable milieu for rest and recreation. It is, in effect, the social conception of the garden.

Fletcher Steele, noted landscape architect, agrees with Tunnard's views of modern building design, but pointed out that Tunnard's views as being another style and not a possible universal conception.

== City planning ==
Tunnard's latter years were spent away from landscape architecture. He taught at Yale University for city planning, became more focused on preserving historic buildings, and wrote many books on urban planning. He became one of the founders of the New Haven Preservation Trust in the early 1960s.

Eckbo stated that landscape architecture lost a great man when Tunnard went into city planning.

== Books ==
- 1928: Gardens in the Modern Landscape
- 1953 The City of Man
- 1955 American Skyline
- 1963 Man-Made America: Chaos or Control?
- 1968 The Modern American City
- 1978 A World With a View

== See also ==
- Landscape design history

== Bibliography ==
- Jacques, David; Woudstra, Jan (2009), Landscape Modernism renounced. The career of Christopher Tunnard (1910–1979), Routledge.
