= Ivan Chermayeff =

Graphic designer and artist (1932–2017)

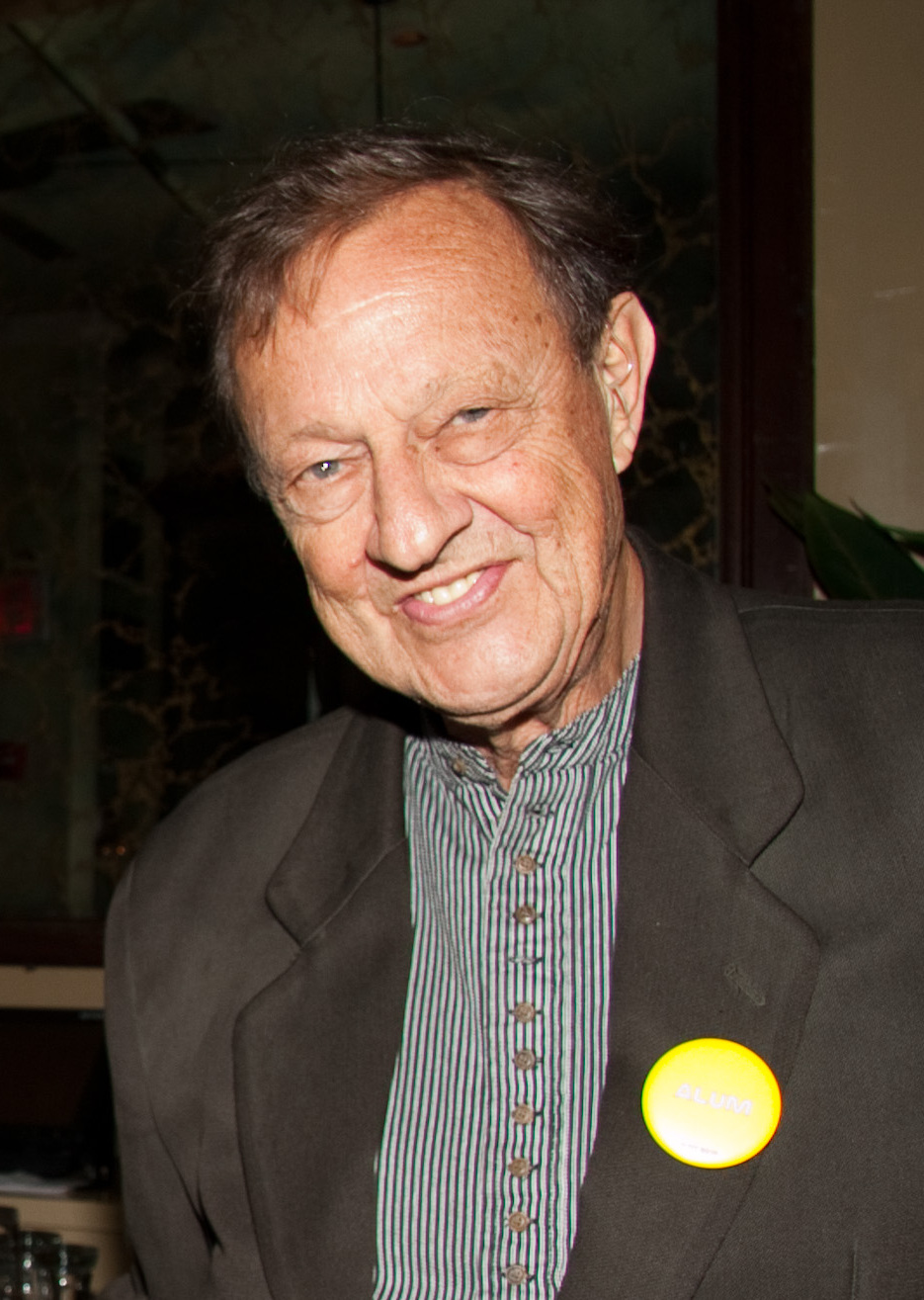
- Chermayeff in 2012
- Born: June 6, 1932; London, England
- Died: December 2, 2017 (aged 85); New York City
- Occupation: Graphic designer
- Children: Sam Chermayeff, Maro Chermayeff, Catherine Chermayeff, Sacha Chermayeff
- Father: Serge Chermayeff
- Awards: AIGA Medal, National Design Award for Lifetime Achievement, AIA Industrial Arts Medal

Ivan Chermayeff HonRDI (June 6, 1932 – December 2, 2017) was a British-born American graphic designer and artist. He is best known as co-founder of graphic design firm Chermayeff & Geismar. Chermayeff created logotypes for the Smithsonian Institution, New York Museum of Modern Art, and Harper Collins publishing house, as well as numerous poster designs, book covers, architectural sculptures, exhibitions, illustrations, and fine art. Chermayeff is credited with introducing the concept of design as problem-solving and inventing the modern graphic design profession.

== Childhood and early career ==
Son of Serge Chermayeff, an acclaimed Russian-born British architect from a wealthy Jewish Caucasian family, Ivan Chermayeff was born in London in 1932. He spent a part of his childhood at the family’s Bentley Wood estate in Sussex, South East England, in a landmark 1938 timber house considered one of the earliest examples of modernist architecture, frequented by prominent artists and architects including Frank Lloyd Wright. After economic conditions in England deteriorated as the result of the World War II, Chermayeffs went through a personal bankruptcy.

In 1940, when Ivan Chermayeff was 8 years old, they emigrated to the United States in search of better job opportunities. After arriving in the U.S., Chermayeff and his younger brother Peter spent nearly a year living with Walter Gropius in Lincoln, Massachusetts, while his parents looked for permanent housing.

Chermayeff attended no fewer than 24 different schools. He studied at Phillips Academy of Andover, Harvard University, and IIT Institute of Design in Chicago. In 1955, he graduated from the Yale School of Arts and Architecture with a Bachelor of Fine Arts, where he trained under Swiss designer Herbert Matter. The same year he apprenticed with architect Edward Larrabee Barnes and designer Alvin Lustig, and was hired by CBS as assistant Art Director in record cover design department, tasked with producing multiple vinyl record jacket designs per day.

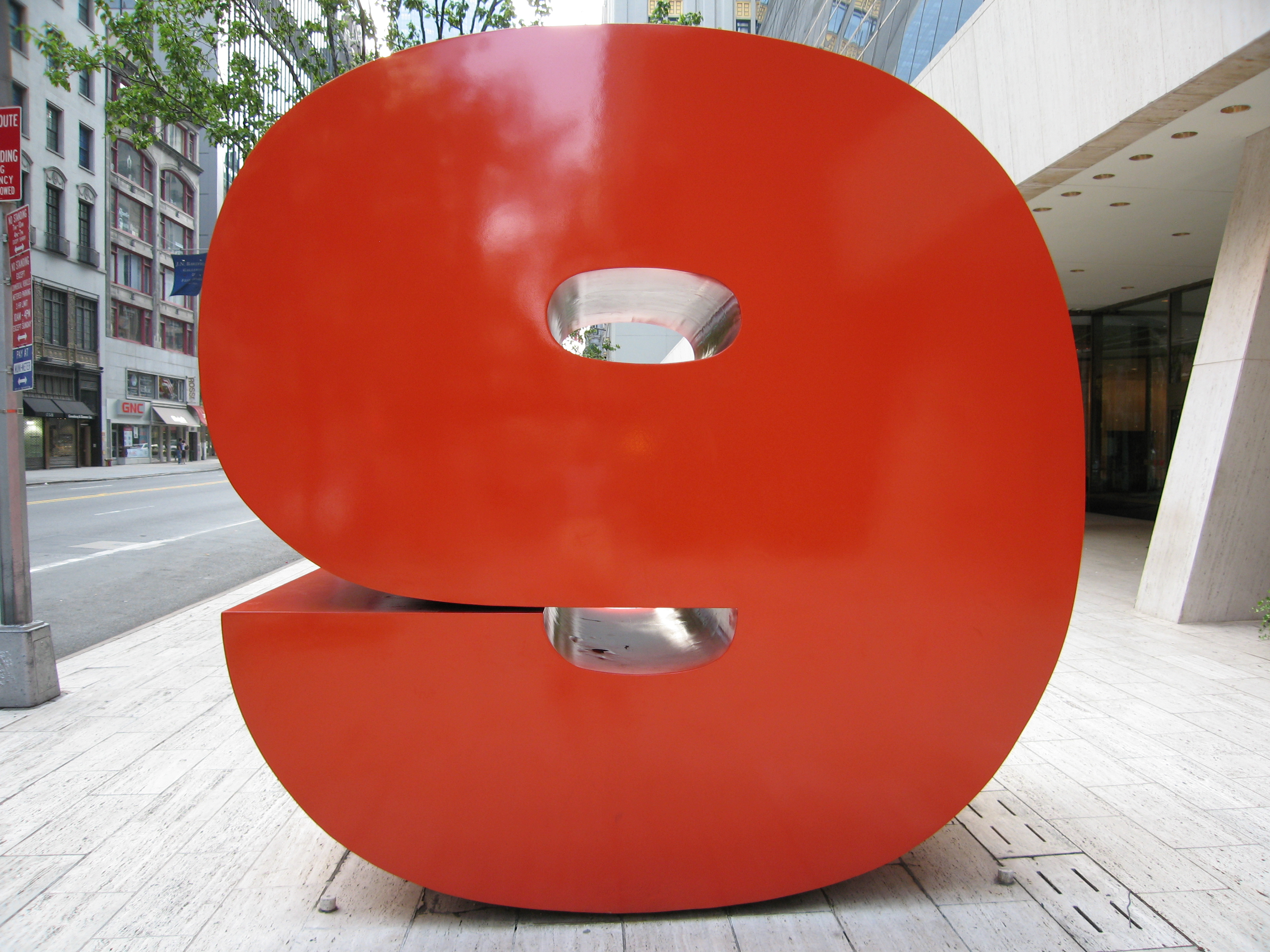
Sidewalk sculpture in red steel at 9 West 57th Street in New York City, designed by Ivan Chermayeff in 1974.

== Chermayeff & Geismar ==
In 1957 Chermayeff co-founded Brownjohn, Chermayeff & Geismar with former Yale schoolmate Tom Geismar and family friend, designer Robert Brownjohn. In 1959 Brownjohn left and the studio changed the name to Chermayeff & Geismar Associates. With a client roster that included Mobil, Xerox, Pan Am, and Chase Bank, it quickly became one of the leading corporate design companies in the United States, and the 60-year long partnership between Chermayeff and Geismar was compared to that of John Lennon and Paul McCartney. One of the earliest examples of a designer-run design agency, in 1960s Chermayeff & Geismar had a pivotal influence on the emerging industry of graphic design in the United States.

The firm produced over six hundred logomarks, some of them considered the most recognizable brands ever created, including one of the first ever abstract trademarks for Chase Bank (1960) still in use today.

Other logotypes created by Chermayeff include the Smithsonian Institution, PBS (1984), MoMA, Barneys New York, WGBH (1974), Pan Am Airlines, National Geographic, MOCA, New England Aquarium, Harper Collins publishing house, New York University, and Showtime Network.

While best known for his achievements in corporate branding, throughout his career Chermayeff also designed numerous book covers and over 300 posters. His best-known poster series include richly-illustrated, playful designs for PBS Masterpiece Theatre and minimal, photographic works for Pan Am World Airways, co-created with Tom Geismar. Posters from both series are held in the permanent collection of New York’s Museum of Modern Art.

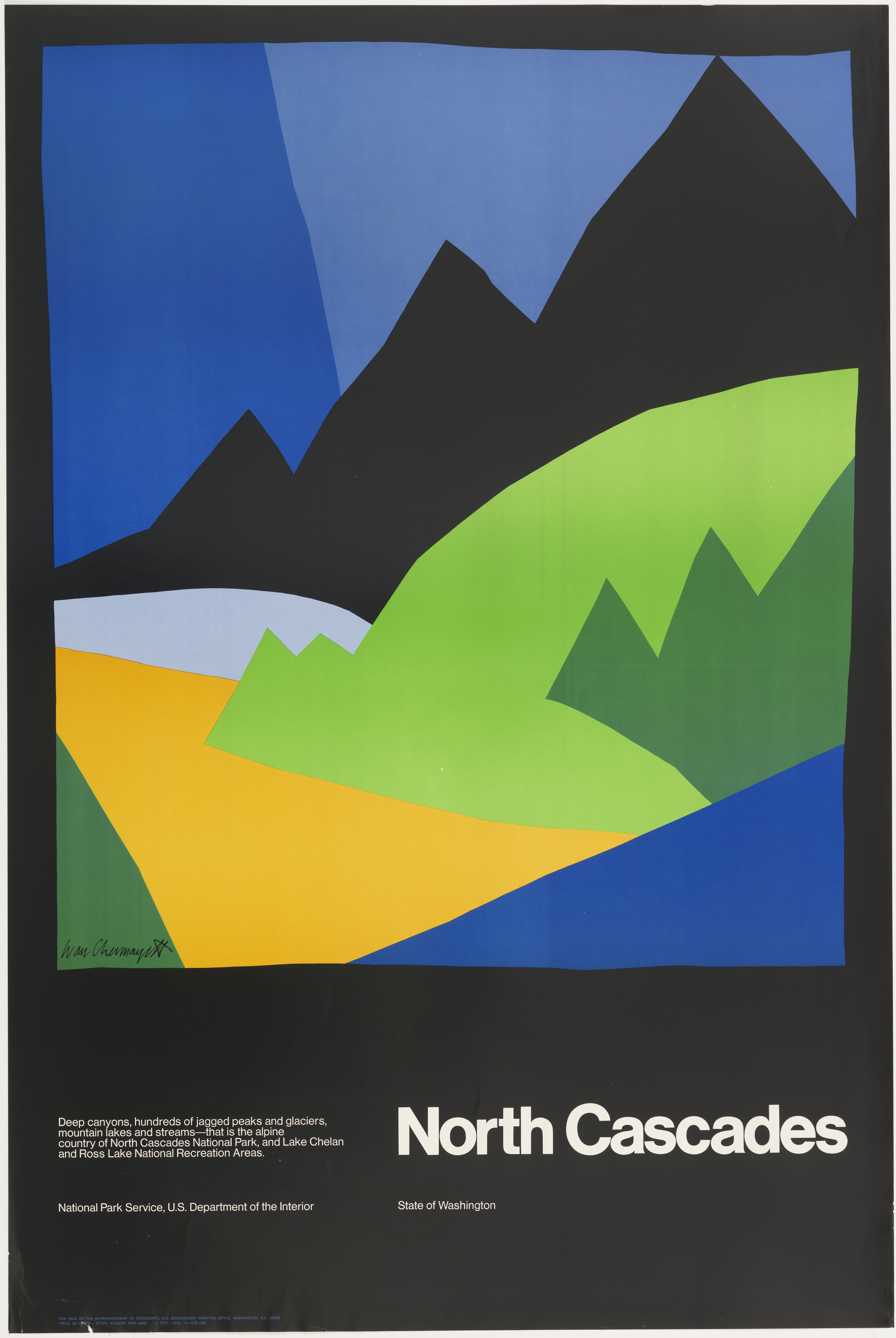
A poster for North Cascades National Park designed and illustrated by Ivan Chermayeff in 1972.

In 1978, Chermayeff created the Kennedy Center Honors rainbow ribbon medals, in use until 2025.

== CambridgeSeven ==
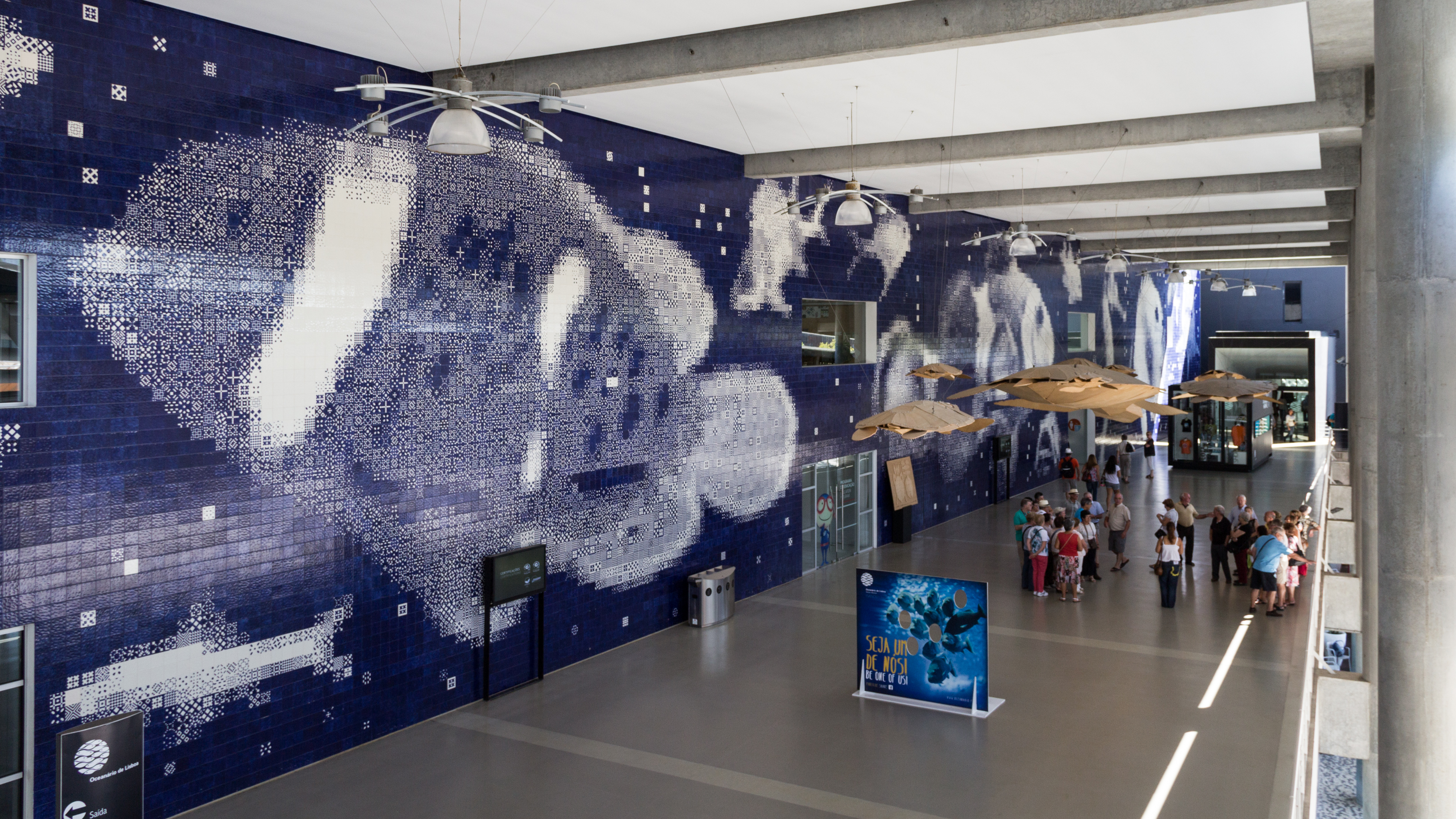
Tiled mural titled "The Tiles of the Oceans" at Lisbon Oceanarium in Portugal, designed by Ivan Chermayeff

Chermayeff was a partner at Cambridge Seven Associates, an architectural studio he co-founded in 1962 with six others, including his younger brother, architect Peter Chermayeff, Tom Geismar, Alden Christie, Louis Bakanowsky, Paul Dietrich, and Terry Rankine.

Many of Chermayeff’s projects in exhibition and signage design, including the Kennedy Presidential Library, signage for the Boston public transit system, and Osaka Aquarium, were developed in collaboration with CambridgeSeven.

== Career in illustration ==
Chermayeff was an accomplished artist and illustrator. Most of his illustrations were made using the collage technique, with occasional use of mixed media, sculpture, painting, drawing, photography, serigraphy, lithography, and finger painting. Additionally, Chermayeff designed tapestries and murals. He recalled making art, collages in particular, throughout his life, beginning in his teenage years.

He was particularly drawn to bricolage, utilizing pieces of scrap paper and garbage like candy bar wrappers or used envelopes to depict expressive, abstract faces. He reported to work on collages between phone calls or meetings, with many pieces taking only minutes to assemble. One of his favorite bricolage materials were abandoned work gloves he collected from the streets of New York City. Chermayeff’s collages were exhibited in over 40 solo exhibitions throughout the U.S., Europe, and Japan.

He illustrated multiple children’s books, including Sun Moon Star, a Nativity story, with text by Kurt Vonnegut, first published in 1980. Sun Moon Star was later translated into multiple languages, including Japanese. Many of Chermayeff’s other children’s books were co-authored with his children and second wife Jane Clark Chermayeff.

After Chermayeff's death in 2017, a collection of 700 original artworks and illustrations was donated to SVA by his children, and now comprises the Ivan Chermayeff Collection at the Milton Glaser Design Study Center and Archives.

== Style and method ==
=== The supermarket principle ===
Together with Tom Geismar, Chermayeff developed a layout design approach known as "the supermarket principle" that involves combining and repeating a group of similar objects to create an impactful visual. Notable examples of its use include the 1972 poster for the Aspen Design Conference and the 1974 poster promoting the Museum of Immigration at the Statue of Liberty.

=== The play principle ===
Chermayeff rejected rigidity and prescriptiveness of modernism, such as its reliance on grids, in favor of "the play principle", a term he used to describe creation of one-off, whimsical concepts for artworks and an openness to being guided by the project's subject matter. Notable examples of his playful approach to design are the 1975 bus shelter posters for the Whitney and the Guggenheim museums' free admission program sponsored by Mobil Oil.

== Views ==
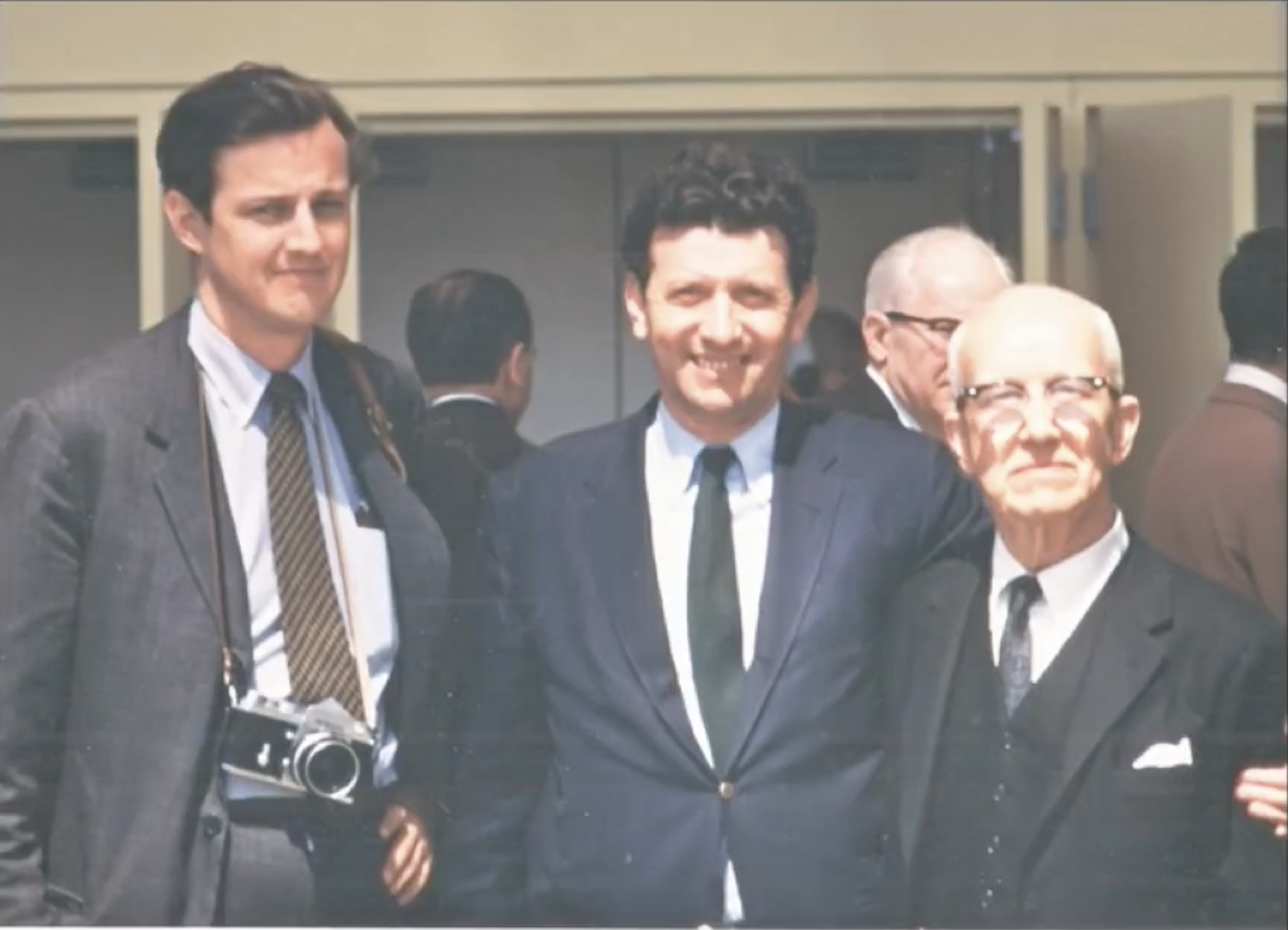
Chermayeff (left) while working on the design of the U.S. pavilion at Expo 67, pictured with United States Information Agency design director Jack Masey (center) and architect Buckminster Fuller (right)

Chermayeff argued that designing, unlike creating art, is a methodical, rational, idea-driven activity and a service aimed primarily at solving a client's business challenge:

Design is not art. Design is not terribly significant. Design is not always better than nothing. Design is the solution to problems real, important or unimportant problems. The problems of design are not designer problems; they are client problems. Design must therefore grow out of a reasonable understanding of those problems, and their goals and aspirations.

He dismissed approaches relying on following styles and trends in brand design, stating that to be successful any brand identity needs to be original:

A memorable identity is one that is appropriate, flexible, and distinguished by its originality. Further, a good trademark, whether a word mark or a symbol, is devoid of fashion or trend, which makes it potentially iconic if it’s seen for long enough in the right places.

== Awards and honors ==
Chermayeff received numerous industry awards including AIGA’s Gold Medal (1979), the Art Directors Club Hall of Fame (1981), the Yale Arts Medal (1985), the Society of Illustrators gold medal, the Industrial Art Medal from the American Institute of Architects, the President's Fellow Award from the Rhode Island School of Design, the Gold Medal from the Philadelphia College of Art, and the Cooper Hewitt’s 2014 National Design Award for Lifetime Achievement. He held an honorary doctorate in fine arts from the Corcoran Gallery of Art.

Chermayeff was a longtime trustee of Museum of Modern Art in New York, a 1963–1966 president of AIGA, and 1988–1996 board director at the Smithsonian Institution. In 1972, he co-chaired the First Federal Design Assembly as part of President Nixon's Federal Design Improvement Program funded by National Endowment for the Arts.

A faculty member at School of Visual Arts in New York, he also taught design at Brooklyn College, Cooper Union, and the Parsons School of Design.

== Influence and legacy ==
Chermayeff is considered to be the author of some of the most recognized logotypes in the history of design, and one of designers who shaped the profession of commercial graphic design. He was one of the first design practitioners to refer to design as problem-solving.

== Personal life ==
Chermayeff lived on Upper East Side of Manhattan in New York City. Throughout his lifetime, he also owned residences in Girona, Spain, Litchfield, Connecticut, and Garrison, New York.

Chermayeff's final public appearance was at the AIGA Design conference in Minneapolis in October 2017. He died on December 3, 2017, at the age of 85, in New York City.

He was married to Sara Anne Duffy Chermayeff (née Sara Anne Duffy), the daughter of Edmund Duffy, from 1955 until 1977, and to exhibit curator Jane Clark Chermayeff (née Jane Clark) from 1978 until her death in 2014. He had four children: Sam Chermayeff, an architect based in Berlin, Maro Chermayeff, producer, filmmaker, and founder of MFA Social Documentary Film at School of Visual Arts, artist Sacha Chermayeff, and photo editor Catherine Chermayeff. His younger brother Peter Chermayeff is an architect known for aquarium designs.

== Books ==
=== Books by ===
- Ivan Chermayeff. Observations on American Architecture (New York: Viking, 1972, ISBN 978-0-670-52019-0)
- Ivan Chermayeff, Richard Saul Wurman, Ralph Caplan, Peter Bradford, Jane Clark. The Design necessity: a casebook of federally initiated projects in visual communications, interiors and industrial design, architecture, landscaped environment (Cambridge, Massachusetts: MIT Press, 1973, ISBN 978-0-262-03047-2)
- Ivan Chermayeff. Collages (New York: Abrams, 1991, ISBN 978-0-8109-2476-5)
- Ivan Chermayeff, Fred Wasserman, Mary J. Shapiro. Ellis Island: An Illustrated History of the Immigrant Experience (New York: Macmillan Pub Co, 1991, ISBN 978-0-02-584441-4)
- Ivan Chermayeff, Tom Geismar, Sagi Haviv. TM: Trademarks Designed by Chermayeff & Geismar (New York: Princeton Architectural Press, 2000, ISBN 978-1-56898-256-4)
- Ivan Chermayeff. Suspects, Smokers, Soldiers, and Salesladies: Collages by Ivan Chermayeff (Baden, Switzerland: Lars Müller Publishers, 2001, ISBN 978-3-907078-37-2)
- Ivan Chermayeff, Tom Geismar and Steff Geissbuhler. Designing: (New York: Graphis, 2003, ISBN 978-1-932026-14-6)
- Ivan Chermayeff and Tom Geismar. Watching Words Move (New York: Chronicle Books, 2006, ISBN 978-0-8118-5214-2)
- Ivan Chermayeff, Tom Geismar, Sagi Haviv. Identify: Basic Principles of Identity Design in the Iconic Trademarks of Chermayeff & Geismar (New York: HOW Books, 2011, ISBN 978-1-4403-1032-4)

=== Books about ===
- Identity: Chermayeff & Geismar & Haviv (New York: Standards Manual, 2018, ISBN 978-0-692-95523-9)
- Ivan Chermayeff: Mostly Early Covers (Somerville: Katherine Small Gallery, 2018)

=== Children’s books illustrated by ===
- Sandol Stoddard Warburg. The Thinking Book (Boston: Atlantic-Little, Brown, 1960)
- Ivan Chermayeff. 3 Blind Mice and Other Numbers (New York: Colorcraft, 1961)
- Ogden Nash. The New Nutcracker Suite and Other Innocent Verses (Boston: Little, Brown & Company, 1962)
- Kurt Vonnegut & Ivan Chermayeff. Sun Moon Star (New York: Harper & Row, 1980, ISBN 978-0-06-026319-5)
- Ivan Chermayeff, Jane Clark Chermayeff. First Words (New York: Abrams, 1990, ISBN 978-0-8109-3300-2)
- Ivan Chermayeff, Jane Clark Chermayeff. First Shapes (New York: Abrams, 1991, ISBN 978-0-8109-3819-9)
- Ivan Chermayeff. Fishy Facts (New York: Houghton Mifflin, 1994, ISBN 978-0-395-73164-2)
- Ivan Chermayeff. Furry Facts (New York: Houghton Mifflin, 1994, ISBN 978-0-15-230425-6)
- Ivan Chermayeff. Feathery Facts (New York: Houghton Mifflin, 1995, ISBN 978-0-15-200110-0)
- Ivan Chermayeff. Scaly Facts (New York: Houghton Mifflin, 1995, ISBN 978-0-15-200109-4)
- Eve Merriam. The Hole Story (New York: Simon & Schuster, 1995, ISBN 978-0-671-88353-9)

== See also ==
- Tom Geismar
- Chermayeff & Geismar & Haviv
