= Serge Chermayeff =

Russian-British architect (1900–1996)

- Серж Чермаев
- Born: Sergius Ivanovich Issakovitch; 8 October 1900; Grozny, Terek Oblast, Caucasus Viceroyalty, Russian Empire
- Died: 8 May 1996 (aged 95); Wellfleet, Massachusetts, US
- Citizenship: British (from 1928); American (from 1946)
- Occupation: Architect
- Spouse: Barbara Maitland May (m. 1928)
- Children: Ivan Chermayeff; Peter Chermayeff

Sergius "Serge" Ivan Chermayeff (né Sergius Ivanovich Issakovitch; 8 October 1900 – 8 May 1996) was a Russian-born British–American architect, industrial designer, educator and writer. Chermayeff co-founded several architectural societies, including the American Society of Planners and Architects.

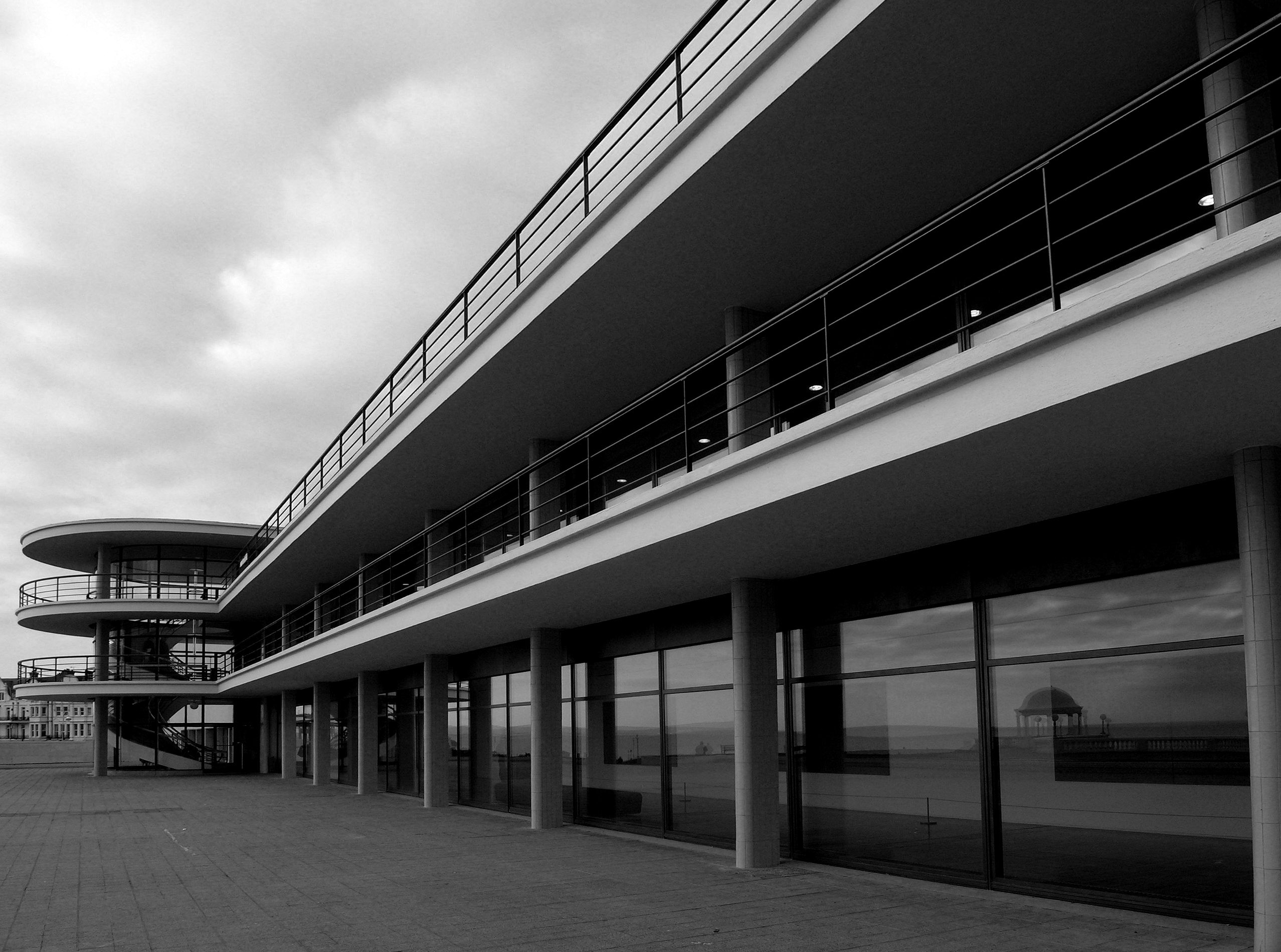
The De La Warr Pavilion in Bexhill on Sea

== Early life ==
Chermayeff was born Sergius Ivanovich Issakovitch (Russian: Сергей Иванович Иссакович) on 8 October 1900 in Grozny, Caucasus Viceroyalty (present-day Chechnya, Russia) to Ivan Akimovitch Issakovitch (died 1924), a banker and landowner, and Rose Issakovitch (née Sonnschein). His grandfather was a livestock farmer. Chermayeff grew up in a wealthy Jewish family of Sephardic Jewish descent, who came into their fortune when land they owned was turned into an oil field. Initially educated by a governess alongside his elder sister, Chermayeff was sent to England in 1910 to be educated at Peterborough Lodge School and later at Harrow School.

Chermayeff was awarded a place at Trinity College but did not attend, declining the offer from Cambridge due to his family abruptly losing all its wealth after the October Revolution. Between 1919–1921 he worked as a dance teacher and competitive tango, foxtrot, and waltz dancer in London and then Argentina.

== Continuing education and early career ==
From 1922 to 1925, Chermayeff received training at various schools in Germany, Austria, France and the Netherlands. During this period, he supported himself as a journalist for the Amalgamated Press (1918–23) before becoming chief designer (1924–27) at E. Williams, a decorating firm. He changed his name to Serge Chermayeff in 1924 after the death of his father.

In 1928, Chermayeff and the French designer Paul Follot were placed in charge of the decorative arts department of Waring & Gillow. Leading a design team that counted 12 design assistants, at Waring & Gillow Chermayeff decorated showrooms and designed furniture, including some of the earliest examples of tubular-steel furnishings in Britain. By 1930, after two years of working at Waring & Gillow, Chermayeff established a reputation as an interior architect and began working independently, giving lectures and publishing in the press. He became a member of RIBA in early 1930s.

== Early career as an architect ==
After practicing architecture independently for three years, Chermayeff and the German architect Erich Mendelsohn briefly partnered between 1933 and 1936 to form their own architectural firm. They created important works in the British modernist movement, notably the De La Warr Pavilion in Bexhill, East Sussex, Cohen House, London, and Shrubs Wood (formerly Nimmo House) in Chalfont St Giles, Buckinghamshire. Chermayeff was also responsible for Shann House in Rugby, Warwickshire, and Gilbey House, an office and factory complex in Camden for gin distillers Gilbey's. These are all now Listed Buildings, being designated Grade I (De La Warr), Grade II* (Cohen House, Shann House, and Shrubs Wood) and Grade II (Gilbey House) respectively. Both Mendelsohn and Chermayeff were members of the MARS Group.

Chermayeff also designed Bentley Wood, a Modernist house in a rural location in the Low Weald in Sussex, completed in 1938. Bentley Wood was Chermayeff's personal residence, designed for himself and his family, although he was forced to sell it only a few years later. The landscape design of the expansive 84 acre grounds was created by Christopher Tunnard. Bentley Wood quickly reached a wide acclaim within architecture circles, with Charles Herbert Reilly calling it 'a regular 'Rolls-Royce of a house' in the Architects' Journal, and James Maude Richards featuring it in his 1940 book An Introduction to Modern Architecture. The house, restored in 2018, is considered a key building of the English Modernism movement.

During the 1930s, Chermayeff taught at European Mediterranean Academy in Cavaliere, France and designed bakelite radio cabinets for the Southend-on-Sea based company EKCO. Chermayeff's minimalist design of the compact model AC74 radio set is included in the collection of the Museum of Modern Art in New York.

== Architect in the U.S. ==
In 1940, Chermayeff emigrated to the United States where he joined Clarence W. W. Mayhew as associate architect, helping Mayhew design his own residence. Chermayeff taught in 1940 and 1941 at the California School of Fine Arts before moving to Brooklyn College, where he served as chair of the department of design until 1946.

From 1941 until his death, he maintained his principal residence on Cape Cod at Wellfleet, Massachusetts. He bought a small summer cabin in the area in 1944, gradually expanding it into a compound with a two-bedroom house, a guest apartment cottage, and a free-standing studio. Guests who stayed at the house included architects Walter Gropius and Eero Saarinen.

In 1946, he was recommended by Walter Gropius to become the president of the Institute of Design in Chicago; there, he was a close friend and mentor to graphic designer Robert Brownjohn. Beginning in 1949, he oversaw the Institute's merger with the Illinois Institute of Technology before ultimately stepping down in 1951. After teaching at the Massachusetts Institute of Technology for a year, he served as a professor and chair of the architecture department at the Harvard University Graduate School of Design (1953–1962) and the Yale University School of Architecture (1962–1971). Following his retirement, he briefly taught at Harvard again in 1974.

== Personal life ==
On 22 March 1928, Chermayeff married Barbara Maitland May (1904–2000). The couple had two sons, the graphic designer and artist Ivan Chermayeff and the architect Peter Chermayeff. Serge Chermayeff was the grandfather to Ivan's children including Sam Chermayeff, an architect and furniture designer, and Maro Chermayeff, a documentary producer.

Chermayeff became a British citizen in 1928, and an American citizen in 1946.

On 8 May 1996 Chermayeff died at his home in Wellfleet, aged 95.

== Books and awards ==
He wrote several books, including Community and Privacy with Christopher Alexander in 1964 and The Shape of Community with Alexander Tzonis in 1971. Chermayeff's architectural drawings, project records, photographs, correspondence, teaching and writing papers, and research files are held by the Dept. of Drawings & Archives at Avery Architectural and Fine Arts Library at Columbia University.

In 1980, Chermayeff was awarded the Sir Misha Black award and was added to the College of Medallists.

== See also ==
- Cape Cod Modern House Trust
