= Tom Geismar =

American graphic designer (born 1931)

- Born: Thomas H. Geismar; July 15, 1931 (age 95); Glen Ridge, New Jersey
- Education: Rhode Island School of Design; Yale School of Art and Architecture
- Occupation: Founding Partner at Chermayeff & Geismar & Haviv
- Known for: Graphic design

Thomas H. Geismar (born July 15, 1931) is an American graphic designer.

== Biography ==
Thomas H. Geismar was born on July 15, 1931, in Glen Ridge, New Jersey.

Geismar studied concurrently at the Rhode Island School of Design and Brown University. He received a master's degree in graphic design from Yale University, School of Art and Architecture where he studied under Josef Albers. After school, he joined the army for two years.

Geismar met Ivan Chermayeff at Yale and in 1957, they founded the firm Brownjohn, Chermayeff & Geismar (now Chermayeff & Geismar & Haviv) along with Robert Brownjohn. Geismar has designed more than a hundred corporate identity programs and established abstract corporate symbols. The unifying element in his work is the repetition of symbols which gives new life to the form. In 1960, he proposed a radical mark for Chase Manhattan Bank which was the repetition of four shapes around a square to form an octagon. It was met with resistance but stood out from competition, leading other corporations to create abstracted corporate logos.

His designs for Xerox, Chase Manhattan Bank, Best Products, Gemini Consulting, PBS, Univision, Rockefeller Center and, most notably, Mobil (1964) have received worldwide acclaim. Geismar has also had major responsibility for many of the firm's exhibition designs and world's fair pavilions. His projects include such major tourist attractions as the Ellis Island Immigration Museum, the Statue of Liberty Museum, the Truman Presidential Library, and the redesigned Star-Spangled Banner exhibition at the Smithsonian National Museum of American History. He has received major awards in the field, including one of the first Presidential Design Awards for helping to establish a national system of standardized transportation symbols.

Geismar was awarded the AIGA medal in 1979. In 1998, he was inducted into the Art Directors Club Hall of Fame. In 2014, he was awarded the National Design Award for Lifetime Achievement along with Chermayeff and the School of Visual Arts’ 26th Masters Series Award recipient.

== Books ==
- Chermayeff, Ivan and Tom Geismar. (2006) Watching Words Move. New York: Chronicle Books ISBN 978-0-8118-5214-2
- Chermayeff, Ivan, Tom Geismar, and Steff Geissbuhler. (2003) designing: New York: Graphis ISBN 978-1-932026-14-6
- Chermayeff & Geismar Inc. (2000) TM: Trademarks Designed by Chermayeff & Geismar. New York: Princeton Architectural Press ISBN 978-1-56898-256-4
- Geismar, Thomas H., Harvey Kahn, Ralph Sessions, Dave Hoffman (photographer). (1998) Spiritually Moving: A Collection of American Folk Art Sculpture. New York: Harry Abrams ISBN 978-0-8109-6365-8

== See also ==
- List of AIGA medalists
