= List of museums in Sardinia =

This is a list of museums in Sardinia, Italy.

image	name	address	city	coordinates
	Serbariu Coal Mine Museum	Miniera di Serbariu, – Carbonia	Carbonia	39.1605°N 8.50998°E
	Porto Flavia		Iglesias	39.33713611°N 8.41255833°E
	Civic Archaeological Museum of the Menhir Statues	Piazza Marconi, 10 - Laconi	Laconi	39.8544798°N 9.0522513°E
	Art Museum of the province of Nuoro	via Sebastiano Satta, 15, Nuoro	Nuoro	40.32146°N 9.33368°E
	Grazia Deledda's Museum	via Grazia Deledda 42, rione Santu Predu, Nuoro	Nuoro	40.32376°N 9.336848°E
	Sardinian Ethnographic Museum	Via Antonio Mereu, 56 – Nuoro	Nuoro	40.3169°N 9.3355°E
	National Archaeological Museum of Nuoro	Via Mannu, 1 – Nuoro	Nuoro	40.321556°N 9.336588°E
	Spazio Ilisso	Via Brofferio, 23 – Nuoro	Nuoro	40.322241°N 9.3338851°E
	Nivola Museum	Via Gonare, 2 – Orani	Orani, Sardinia	40.24737°N 9.180878°E
	Civic Archaeological Museum "Alle Clarisse"	Piazza Baden Powell - Ozieri	Ozieri	40.585877693736506°N 9.003729993945667°E
	National Archaeological Museum of Cagliari	Piazza Arsenale 1	Cagliari	39.22238°N 9.117079°E
