= Adelasia Cocco =

Sardinian medical doctor

- Born: 1885
- Died: 1983 (aged 97–98)
- Occupation: Doctor
- Years active: 1913-1955
- Medical career
- Field: Medicine

Adelasia Cocco (born 1885, died 1983) was a 20th-century Sardinian medical doctor. Born in Sardinia, Cocco became one of the first female medical doctors in Italy.

== Biography ==
Adelasia Cocco was born in Sassari on the island of Sardinia. Her father, Salvatore Cocco, was an intellectual who often collaborated with local newspapers. Interested in medicine from a young age, Adelasia chose to pursue a career in the medical field despite the stigma surrounding women in the field.

In 1907, Cocco enrolled in the University of Pisa's prestigious surgical program. She was unable to complete her degree, and instead enrolled in the University of Sassari. After years of study, she graduated the university in 1913 with a degree in Medicine and Surgery, becoming the second Sardinia woman to do so.

Having achieved her degree, Cocco began to seek employment. In 1914 she applied for a position as the doctor of a small settlement of Seuna near the city of Nuoro. While she initially was turned down, Seuna's officials eventually relented and Cocco was granted the position; in doing so, Cocco became one of the first female doctors in Italy, with some sources naming her as the first. In 1919, she also became the first woman in Sardinia to possess a car license.

Following her success in Seuna, Cocco remained in the area and eventually expanded her practice to include the village of Lollove. In, 1928 she was appointed as a Health Officer in Nuoro, and later became the director of a medical institute.

Cocco retired in the 1950s, and died in Nuoro in 1983 at the age of 98.

== Memorial ==
A street in Nuoro, near the Cathedral of Our Lady of the Snows, between Via Matteotti and Via Antonio Mereu, has been named after Adelasia Cocco.

== Bibliography ==
Onnis, Omar; Mureddu, Manuelle (2019). Illustres. Vita, morte e miracoli di quaranta personalità sarde (in Italian). Sestu: Domus de Janas. ISBN 978-88-97084-90-7. OCLC 1124656644.
