= Antonio Cano =

Sardinian sculptor and architect (1779–1840)

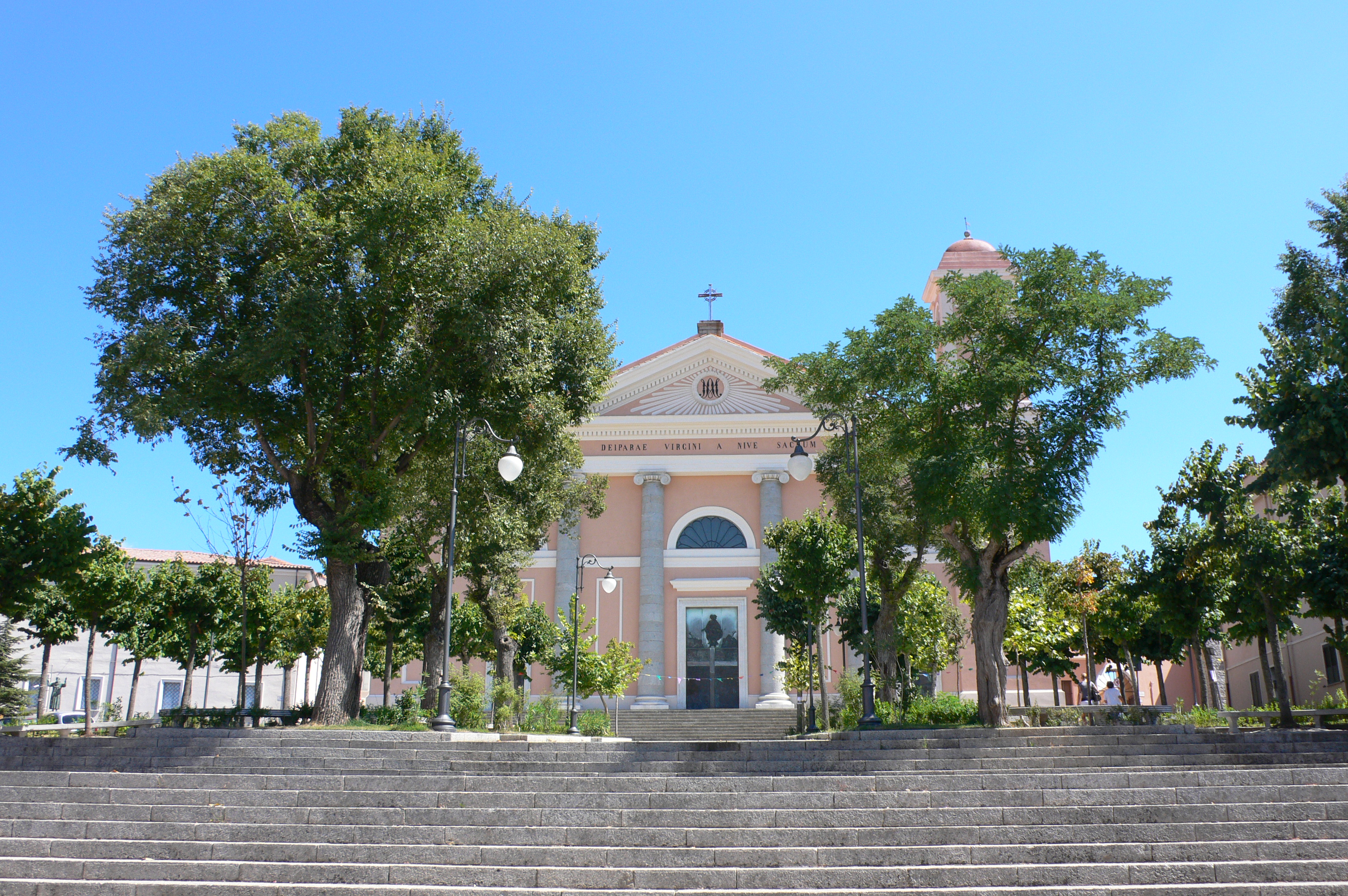
Nuoro Cathedral

Frà Antonio Cano (1779–1840) was a sculptor, architect, and lay friar of the Kingdom of Sardinia.

He is best known as the architect of the Cathedral of Our Lady of the Snows at Nuoro, but also designed churches in Oristano.

== Early life ==
Born in 1779 at Sassari, on the island of Sardinia, Cano became a sculptor and a lay friar of the Order of Friars Minor Conventual. He studied architecture in Rome at the Accademia di San Luca, and trained as a sculptor as a pupil of Antonio Canova.

== Career ==
Although trained in the neoclassical, Cano was drawn to the rococo style, which better suited his temperament. An example of such work is a statue of the Immaculate Conception he made for the church of Santa Maria di Betlem (St Mary of Bethlehem) in his home-town of Sassari.

An early commission was a tomb monument in Cagliari Cathedral for a child of the royal family who died of smallpox in 1799, Carlo Emanuele, only son of Carlo Amedeo of Savoy and his wife Maria Theresa of Austria. The work did not please the child's parents.

As an architect, Cano combined the neoclassical with the rococo. His work includes the renovation of the palace of the Piarists in Oristano and the church at Sassari. Cano was also given the task of demolishing and rebuilding churches in Oristano.

Cano also claimed to be a painter and an archaeologist.

By 1836, the cathedral church of the Diocese of Nuoro in Sardinia was judged too small, and Giovanni Maria Bua, Archbishop of Oristano, ordered it to be pulled down, to make way for the projected new cathedral dedicated to Our Lady of the Snows. The work of designing this was entrusted to Cano.

In 1840, Cano fell from scaffolding at the cathedral while work on it was under way and died within hours.

An English commentator in 1849 noted that Cano had "shown considerable taste and knowledge in the style and proportions" of his neoclassical cathedral. The building was largely complete by 1853 and was consecrated on 3 July 1873.

After the death of Cano, Count Alberto della Marmora, Governor-General of Sardinia, accused him of being a mediocre architect who had destroyed "a considerable number of former basilicas". A twentieth-century assessment similarly was that while his activity as an architect was extraordinarily intense, it was often unjustly destructive, in its hostility towards the Gothic heritage.
