= Art Museum of the province of Nuoro =

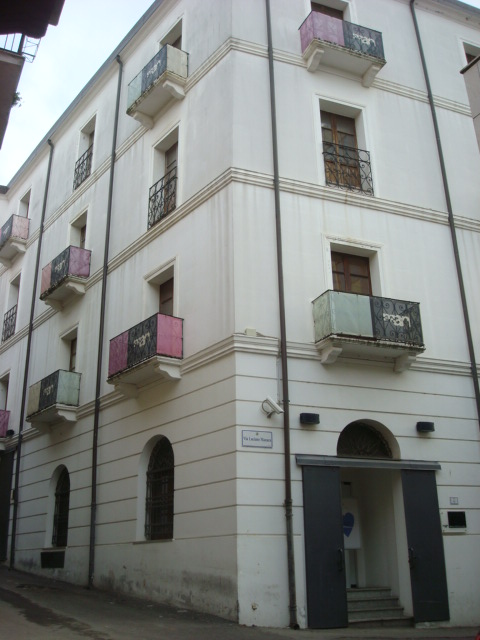
- Entrance of the MAN
- Established: 1999
- Location: via Sebastiano Satta, 15, Nuoro
- Coordinates: 40°19′20″N 9°19′56″E
- Type: Art museum
- Director: Chiara Gatti
- Owner: Province of Nuoro
- Website: http://www.museoman.it/en/

The MAN – Art Museum of the province of Nuoro is a museum in Nuoro, Sardinia.

== History ==
The MAN museum was opened to the public in 1999, in a building from the 1920s that was formerly the seat of the provincial institution, located between the arteries of the historic center of Nuoro. Until 2003 it was inserted as an office within the cultural sector of the provincial administration. The first nucleus of the collection comes from the amalgamation of a few public collections (by the Province, Municipality, Provincial Tourist Board, Chamber of Commerce). The idea of an art gallery for the Province soon developed into a museum project. The collection was enriched by new acquisitions and the activity extended to the territorial context. In 2004 the museum acquired managerial autonomy, structuring itself as an institution without legal personality, and became part of Amaci, the national association of contemporary art museums.

== Exhibition ==
The Museum has organized major exhibitions of contemporary Italian and international artists.

== Permanent exhibition ==
The MAN collection includes paintings by important authors of the Sardinian art history, including Edina Altara, Antonio Ballero, Giuseppe Biasi, Francesco Ciusa, Mario Delitala, Carmelo Floris, Maria Lai, Mauro Manca, Costantino Nivola, Salvatore Fancello and Giovanni Pintori.
