= Deledda Museum =

Coordinates: 40°19′25″N 9°20′13″E

Grazia Deledda Museum
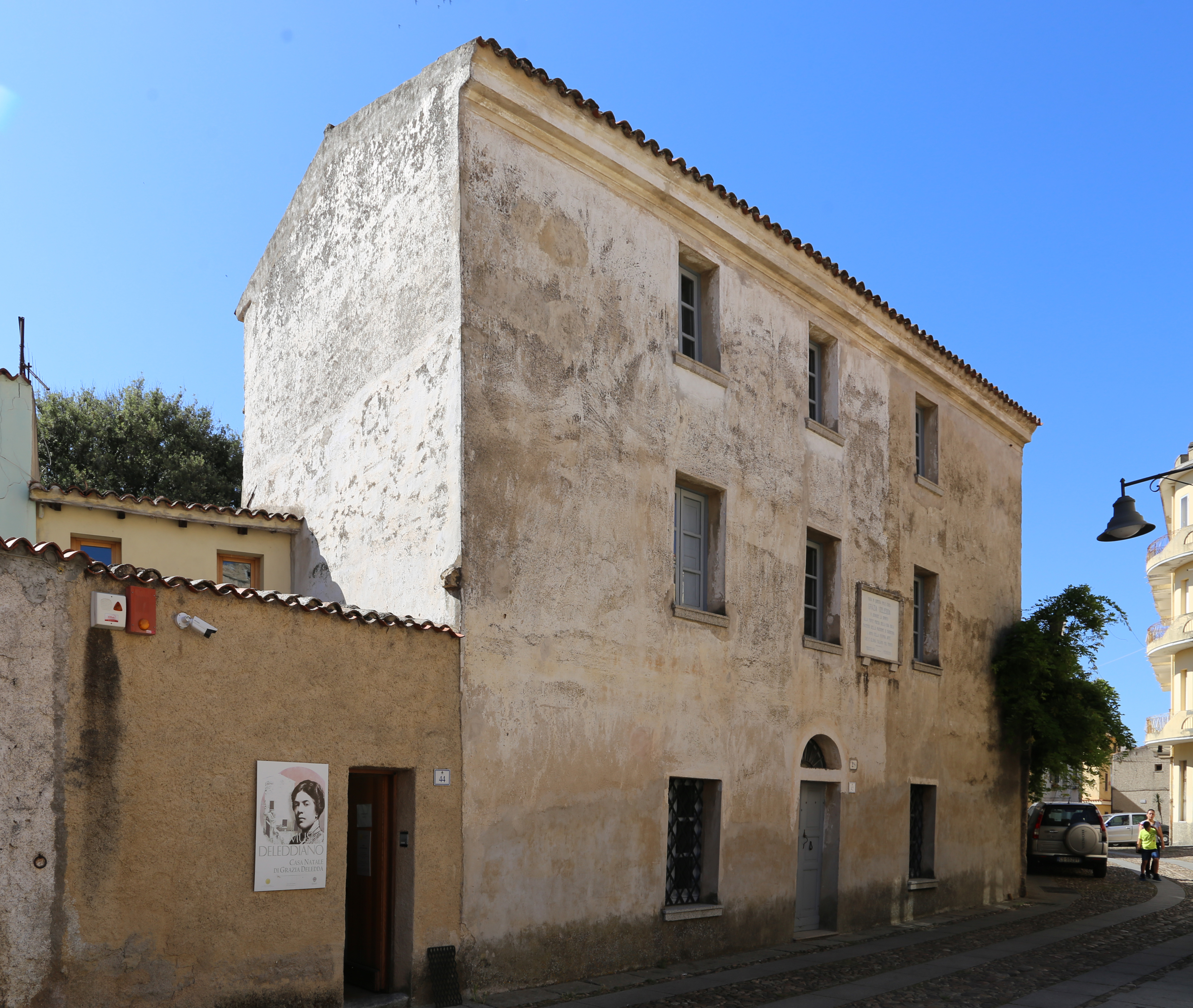
- Former name: Grazia Deledda Birthplace
- Established: 1983
- Location: Nuoro
- Type: House museums

The Deledda Museum, called also Museo Deleddiano in Italian, is the birthplace of the Italian author and 1926 literature Nobel prize Grazia Deledda at Nuoro, Sardinia, and today dedicated to her memory.

== History ==
Grazia Deledda was born and lived inside the house, located in the district of Santu Pedru on the oldest part of the city, until her marriage in 1900. In the 1937 the building was declared national monument. The town of Nuoro purchased the house in 1968 and gifted ten years later to the Sardinian Regional Institute of Ethnography, opening it in 1983 as the Deledda Museum.

Today the museum consists of ten rooms organized on the three flors of the house, where the life of Grazia Deledda is described: all the objects displayed are part of various donations gathered by still the opening of the museum. The current exhibition setting dates back to the year 2006.

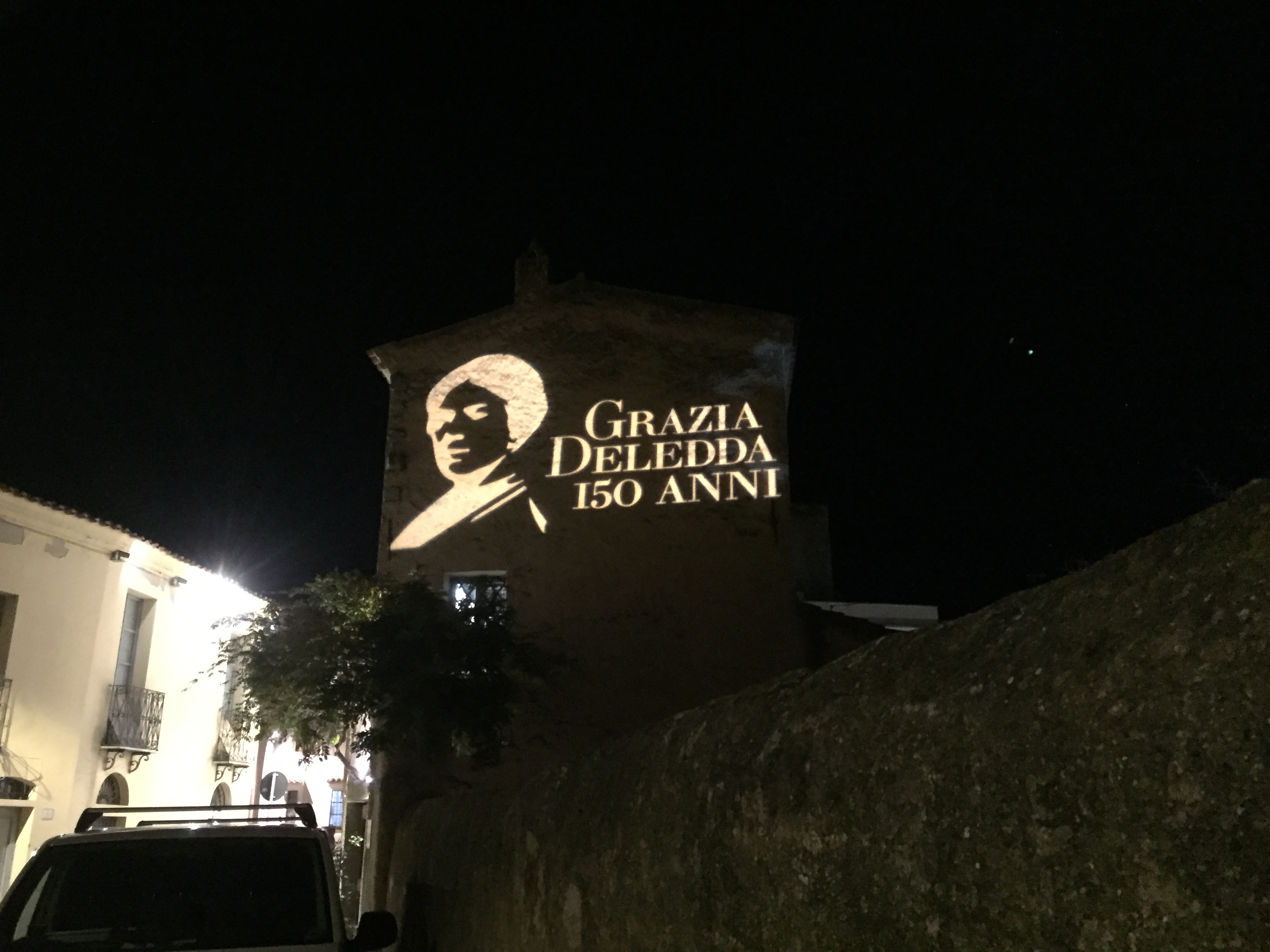
Projection during the 150 years commemoration of Deledda's birth in September 2021.

The set up is organized following the description by Deledda found from one of her most famous novels, Cosima. In what was her parents' room now are hosted the Nobel prize medal and diploma, the travel and the award ceremony in Stockholm; meanwhile the guest room is dedicated to other prominent people from Nuoro contemporary to Deledda, like Francesco Ciusa, Sebastiano Satta, Antonio Ballero and Pasquale Dessanay.

In the courtyard a bookcase is set up with works by Deledda and other Sardinian authors. In summer it host cultural events.
