= Sebastiano Satta =

Italian poet, writer, lawyer and journalist

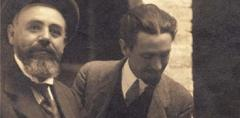
- Sebastiano Satta (left), with sculptor Francesco Ciusa
- Born: 21 May 1867; Nuoro, Sardinia, Italy
- Died: 29 November 1914 (aged 47); Nuoro, Italy
- Education: University of Sassari
- Occupations: Poet, writer, lawyer, journalist
- Writing career
- Language: Italian, Sardinian
- Notable works: Versi Ribelli, Canti Barbaricini

Sebastiano Satta (Nuoro, 21 May 1867 – Nuoro, 29 November 1914) was an Italian poet, writer, lawyer, and journalist.

He is considered the best-known Sardinian poet. Many streets in Italy are named after him, including the square where he used to live in Nuoro, in which sculptures made by Costantino Nivola are located.

In 1894, he graduated with a degree in law from the University of Sassari. After collaborating with the regional newspaper La Nuova Sardegna, he worked successfully in Nuoro as a lawyer.

During his life in Nuoro, he had close relationships with the other intellectuals living in the town, including Francesco Ciusa, Grazia Deledda, and Antonio Ballero. Owing to their notable works, Nuoro was referred to as the "Sardinian Athens" (Atene Sarda).
