= Orto Botanico dell'Università di Sassari =

Coordinates: 40°43′18.18″N 8°32′56.50″E

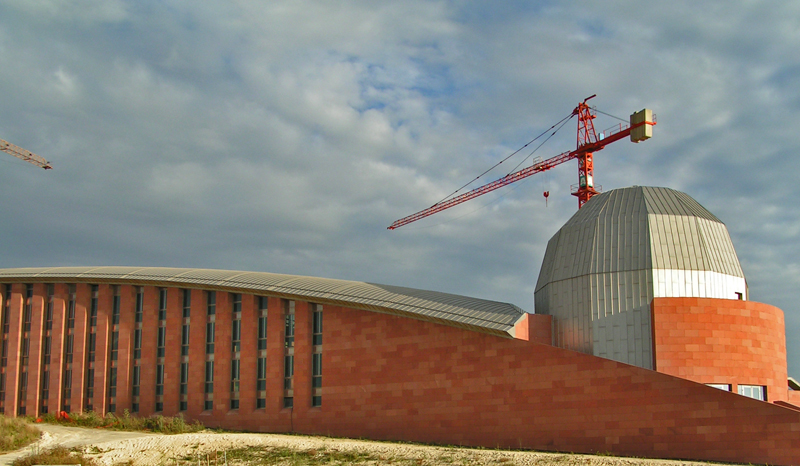
Orto Botanico dell'Università di Sassari under construction

The Orto Botanico dell'Università di Sassari is a new building complex (still unfinished after several decades) now being constructed for the University of Sassari. It is located between Via Piandanna and SP15m at the western edge of Sassari, Sardinia, Italy, and appears to be a successor to an earlier garden maintained by Regia Università di Sassari circa 1890-1910 Unclear events have accompanied the history of this building complex: and at that time, after 2009, criminal investigations were initiated.
