= Spazio Ilisso =

- Established: December 14, 2019
- Location: via Brofferio, 23, Nuoro, Sardinia, Italy
- Type: Art museum
- Collections: Sculpture, Photography
- Founders: Vanna Fois, Sebastiano Congiu
- Director: Antonello Cuccu
- Owner: Ilisso Edizioni
- Website: https://spazioilisso.it/

Spazio Ilisso - Art Archives Museum is a Sardinian cultural promotion and enhancement center that integrates a museum with a permanent exhibition on 20th century and contemporary Sardinian sculpture, temporary exhibitions, digital archives and events.

It's located in the historic center of Nuoro.

== History ==
Spazio Ilisso opened to the public on the 14 of December 2019. Is located in the architectonic complex of the old Papandrea House, an Art Deco-style villa, adapted for the new function after a long and detailed philological restoration. This architectural complex contains an internal part for exhibitions and an external one, thanks to the presence of a courtyard already used for the placing of sculptures by Sardinian artists.

Since December 2019 it has hosted a photo exhibition by Marianne Sin-Pfältzer, German photographer and designer of which the Ilisso publishing house, that manages the museum structure, manages the photographic archive,. and who has worked a lot in Sardinia, also spending the last years of her life in Nuoro. On one of its floors and in the internal courtyard it hosts, from 7 July 2021, a permanent exhibition on the most important Sardinian sculptors of the twentieth century.

== Exposition ==
=== Permanent - Museum of 20th-century sculpture ===
The permanent collection, inaugurated on 7 July 2021, is dedicated to 20th century Sardinian sculpture, and includes works by Francesco Ciusa, Maria Lai, Salvatore Fancello, Costantino Nivola, Eugenio Tavolara, Pinuccio Sciola and Gavino Tilocca.

=== Temporary exhibitions ===
The temporary exhibitions are curated by the same Ilisso publishing house .

- “Marianne Sin-Pfältzer - Paesaggi umani” (2019-2020) Monographic exhibition dedicated to the German photographer Marianne Sin-Pfältzer.
- ”Osserva le distanze - Esercita il pensiero” (2020) Exhibition in collaboration with the AIAP.

=== Digital Archives of Applied Arts and Historical Photography ===
Spazio Ilisso hosts the digital archives of Applied Art and Historical Photography, which collect photographs, films and documentaries on Sardinia with contributions from many photographers such as Marianne Sin-Pfältzer, Max Leopold Wagner, Raffaele Ciceri, Antonio Ballero.
