= University of Sassari =

Public university in Sassari, Italy

Coordinates: 40°43′29.46″N 8°33′35.09″E

- Università degli Studi di Sassari
- Motto: Susceptum perfice munus (Latin)
- Type: Public
- Established: 1562; 464 years ago
- Affiliations: Vives Network
- Rector: Gavino Mariotti
- Administrative staff: 700
- Students: 13,000
- Location: Sassari, Sardinia, Italy
- Campus: Urban
- Sports teams: CUS Sassari
- Website: www.uniss.it

The University of Sassari (Italian: Università degli Studi di Sassari, UniSS) is a public university located in Sassari, Italy. It was founded in 1562 and is organized in 13 departments.

The University of Sassari earned first place in the rankings for the best "medium-sized" Italian university, in 2009–2010, by the Censis Research Institute, the university has maintained its spot near the top of the rankings for mid-sized Italian institutions over the following years, securing 3rd place nationally for 2024-25.

== History and profile ==
The University of Sassari was founded by Alessio Fontana, member of Imperial Chancellery of Emperor Charles V and a distinguished gentleman in the town of Sassari in 1558. The official opening dates back to the month of May 1562. It was first run by the Jesuits.

Today, the University, which is of medium size, with a total number of over 18,000 students and about 700 teachers, comprises eleven faculties and over 40 departments, study centres and institutes. There are several specialist schools, research institutions, schools for special research and postgraduate schools.

== Corporate relations ==
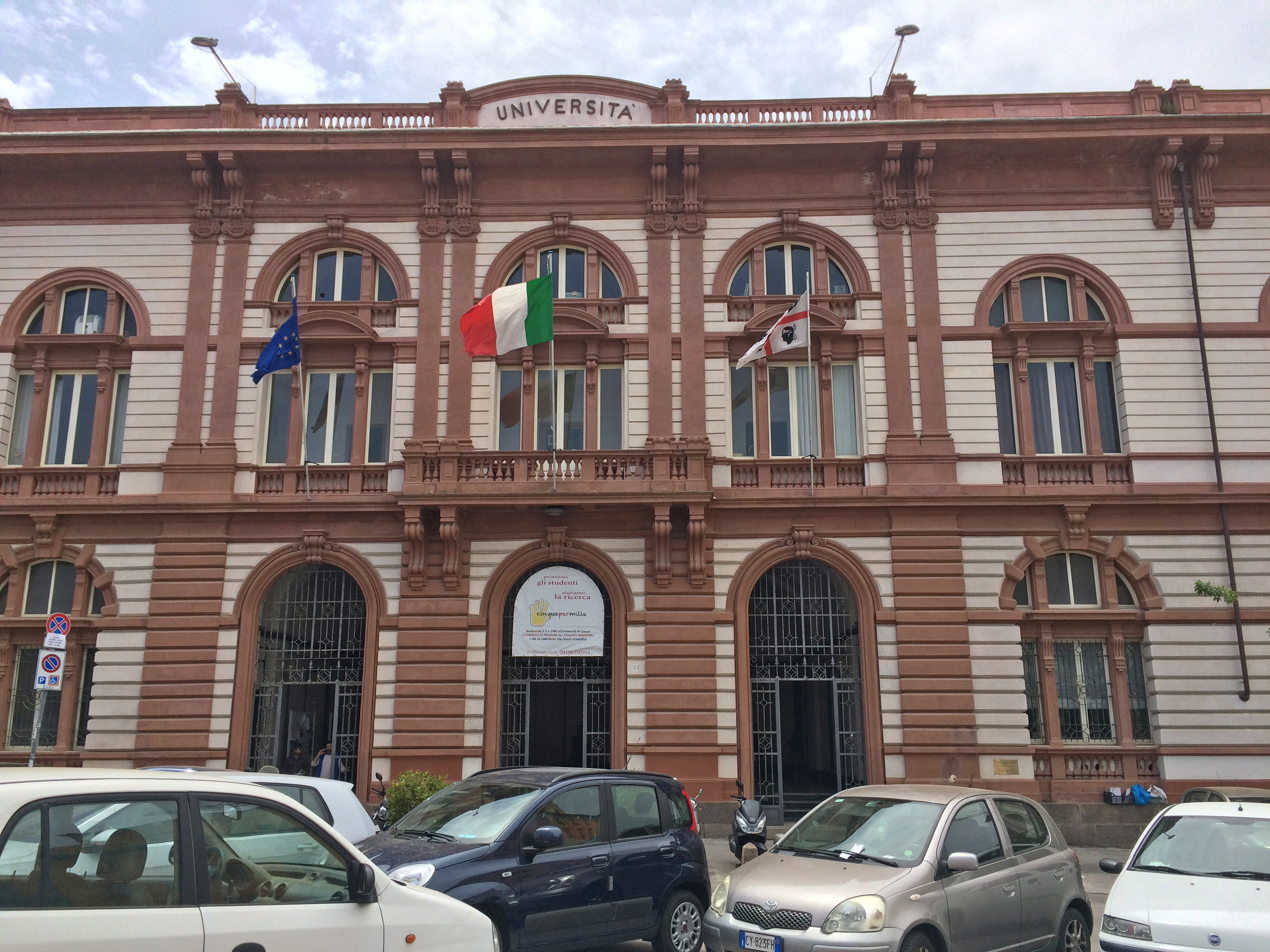
Facade of the main building

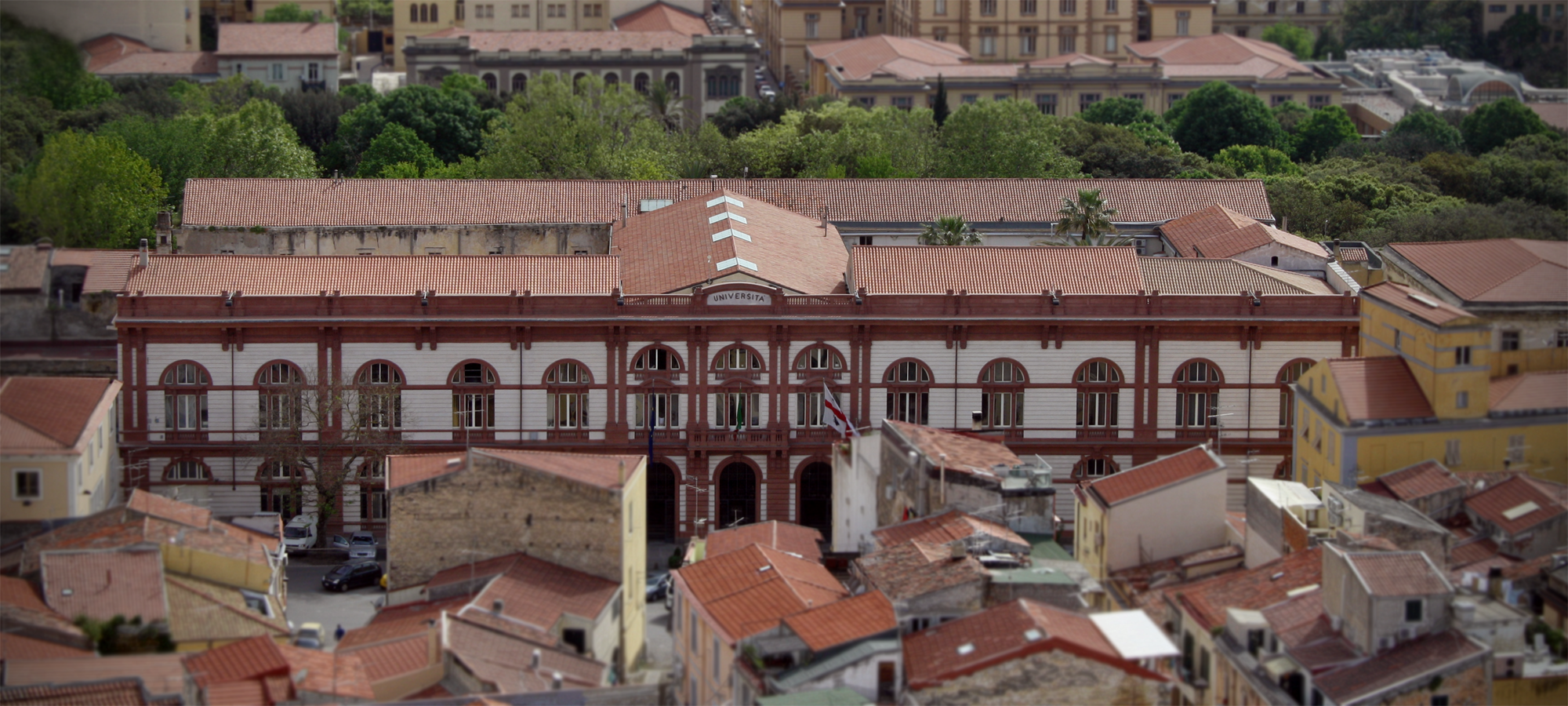
Main building of University of Sassari

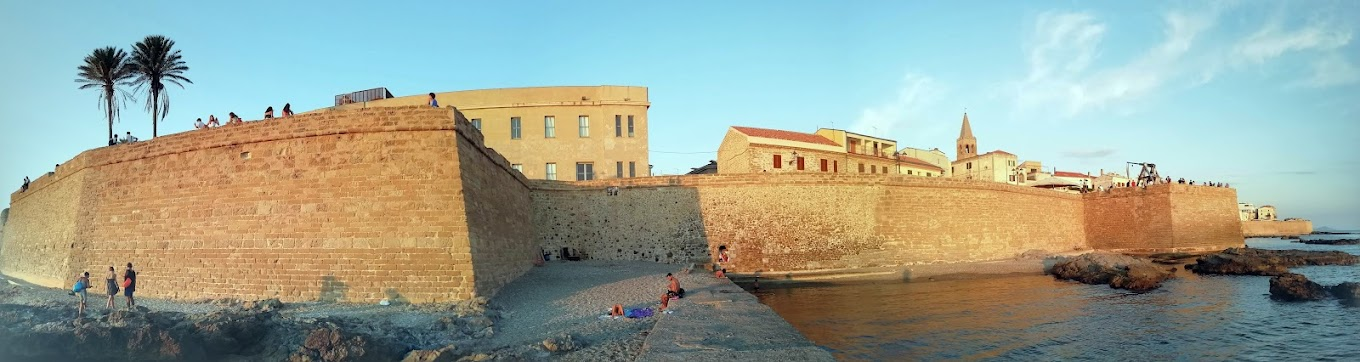
On the left is the headquarters of the Faculty of Architecture, Planning, and Design in Alghero

As one of the oldest universities in Italy, Sassari is currently developing a modern network of corporate opportunities for its students, and recently collaborated with TreeAndHumanKnot a giving first ideology of RisingIndia ThinkTank to have students of the university an international experience.

== Organization ==
These are the 11 faculties in which the university is divided into:

- Faculty of Agriculture
- Faculty of Architecture
- Faculty of Arts
- Faculty of Economics and Business
- Faculty of Foreign Languages and Literature
- Faculty of Law
- Faculty of Mathematical, Physical and Natural Sciences
- Faculty of Medicine and Surgery
- Faculty of Political Science
- Faculty of Pharmacy
- Faculty of Veterinary Medicine

According to the National Law 240/2010, the Departments substituted for the Faculties from January 2012.

There are 10 Departments at the University of Sassari:

- Agraria (Agriculture)
- Architettura, design e urbanistica (Architecture, Design and City Planning)
- Chimica e farmacia (Chemistry and Pharmacy)
- Giurisprudenza (Law)
- Medicina veterinaria (Veterinary Medicine)
- Scienze biomediche (Biomedical Sciences)
- Scienze economiche e aziendali (Economic and Business Sciences)
- Scienze mediche, chirurgiche e sperimentali (Medical, Surgical, Experimental Sciences)
- Scienze umanistiche e sociali (Humanistic and Social Sciences)
- Storia, scienze dell'uomo e della formazione (History, Human Sciences, Education)

== Points of interest ==
- Orto Botanico dell'Università di Sassari, the university's botanical garden

== Notable alumni ==
- Enrico Berlinguer – politician
- Adelasia Cocco – possibly the first female doctor in Italy
- Francesco Cossiga – President of Italy
- Antonio Pigliaru – Jurist and philosopher
- Salvatore Satta – jurist and writer
- Antonio Segni – President of Italy
- Mariotto Segni – politician and professor of civil law
- Beppe Pisanu – politician and minister
- Luigi Berlinguer – University professor of law, minister and rector

== See also ==
- List of early modern universities in Europe
- List of Italian universities
- List of Jesuit sites
