= Nuoro Cathedral =

Church in Nuoro, Sardinia, Italy

- Cathedral of Our Lady of the Snows; Cattedrale di Santa Maria della Neve
- The cathedral and its square

- Location within Italy
- 40°19′14″N 09°20′12″E
- Location: Nuoro, Sardinia
- Country: Italy
- Denomination: Roman Catholic

History
- Status: Cathedral of the Roman Catholic Diocese of Nuoro
- Consecrated: 3 July 1873

Architecture
- Previous cathedrals: one
- Architect: Antonio Cano
- Style: Neoclassical
- Years built: 1836–1873
- Groundbreaking: 12 November 1836

Administration
- Archdiocese: Cagliari
- Diocese: Galtelli-Nuoro (1779–1928); Nuoro

Clergy
- Archbishop: Giuseppe Baturi
- Bishop: Mosè Marcia

Nuoro Cathedral (Italian: Cattedrale di Santa Maria della Neve; Duomo di Nuoro), also known as Cathedral of Our Lady of the Snows, is the main place of Roman Catholic worship in Nuoro, Sardinia, and the cathedral church of the diocese of Nuoro.

Built in the mid-nineteenth century, it stands in a square called the Piazza Santa Maria della Neve and is dedicated to the Madonna of the Snow (in Italian: Madonna della Neve; also, Our Lady of the Snows, Italian: Nostra Signora della Neve), the patron saint of Nuoro, whose cult is closely linked to the basilica of Santa Maria Maggiore in Rome.

== History ==
In 1779, with a papal bull called Eam inter Cœteras, Pope Pius VI reconstituted the ancient diocese of Galtellì, which had been abolished by Pope Alexander VI in 1496. However, the former seat of Galtelli was small and was not judged suitable as the home of an episcopal see, and the choice of a new seat fell on Nuoro. This had already for centuries been the seat of the pievania, first at an ancient church of St Aemilian, and later at the church of Santa Maria ad Nives, dating at least from the first half of the sixteenth century. In re-establishing the diocese, Pius VI chose that church as its cathedral.

In 1828, the Bishop of Galtelli-Nuoro, Antonio Maria Casabianca, was put under an interdict, and soon afterwards Giovanni Maria Bua, Archbishop of Oristano, was appointed as apostolic administrator of the diocese.

Buo judged the ancient church to be too small to serve as a permanent cathedral and ordered it to be pulled down, to make way for a new one. He entrusted the work of designing this to a Franciscan, Frà Antonio Cano (1779–1840), who had studied architecture in Rome and who had already worked on demolishing and rebuilding churches in Oristano. Cano was a sculptor and a lay friar of the Order of Friars Minor Conventual.

The foundation stone was laid on 12 November 1836, shortly after Charles Albert of Sardinia had declared Nuoro to be a city. The budget for the building work was 34,000 Sardinian Lire, and an English commentator noted that the new church seemed far too large, as Nuoro already had eight other churches.

In 1840, Cano fell from scaffolding at the cathedral and died within hours. By chance, Buo also died in the same year. The building works were held up by these setbacks, and also by a lack of funds, but the building was largely complete by 1853. The new cathedral was consecrated on 3 July 1873 by the bishop of the diocese, Salvatore Angelo Demartis, and by Bishop Francesco Zunnui Casula.

== Architecture ==
The cathedral is in the neoclassical style and overlooks a large square in the historic centre of Nuoro. The west front recalls a classical temple, with four half-columns of granite which have Ionic capitals and support a triangular tympanum. This is framed by two identical bell towers, with a small dome above each of them. The walls are built of granite and rubble, rendered over with cement.

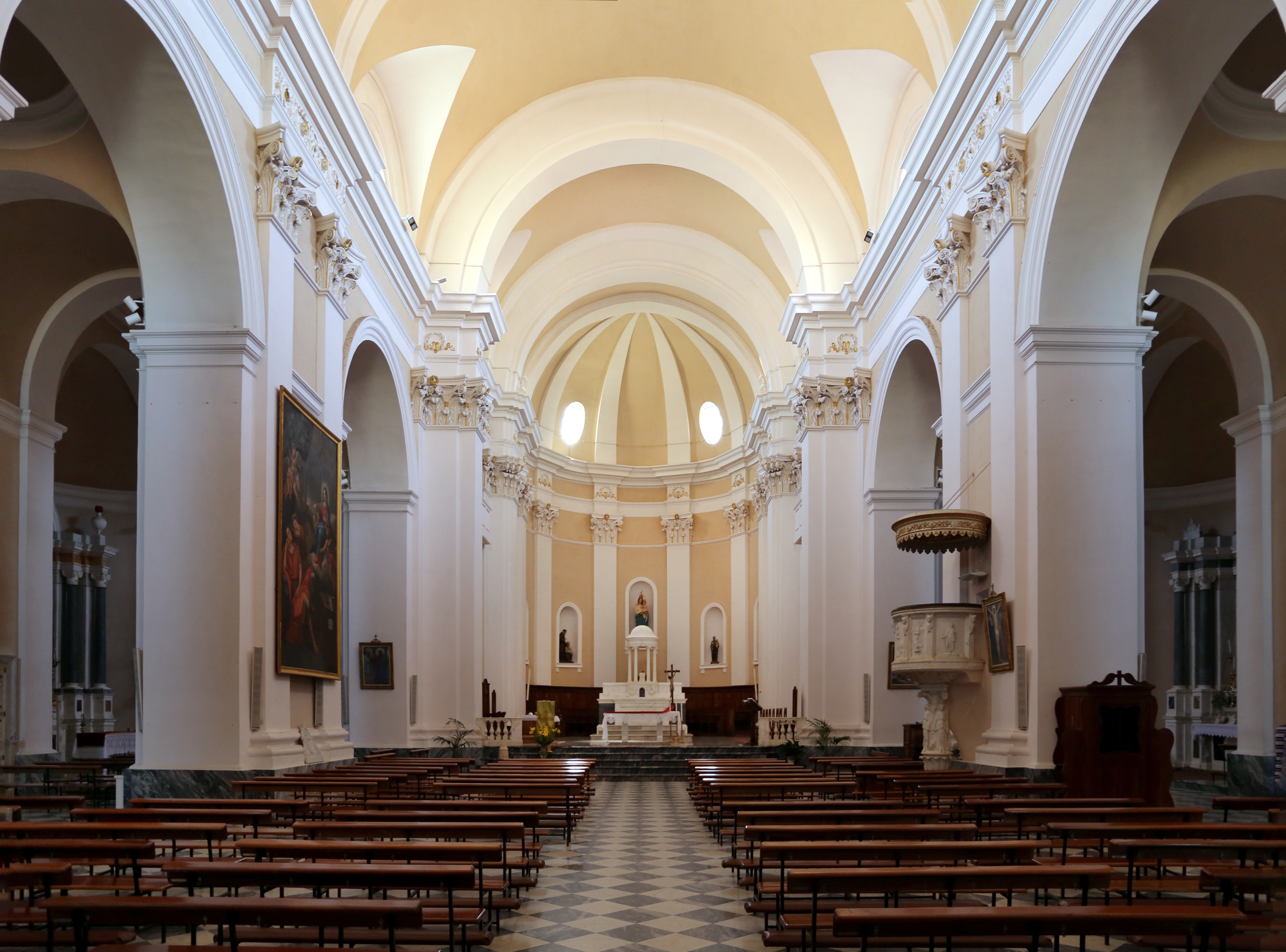
The nave

The interior has a large barrel-vaulted nave, and all around this is an entablature supported by pilasters which have Corinthian capitals. There are three chapels on each side of the nave, connecting with each other and each having a semicircular apse; the large spaces between them give the effect of side aisles. The chancel is raised a few steps above the nave and was at first enclosed by a marble baluster, which was taken out after the restoration work done between 2000 and 2006. At the east end of the cathedral is a semicircular apse, furnished with wooden choir stalls.

In the first chapel on the right of the nave is the baptismal font and a statue of St John the Baptist, elements re-used from the previous church. In the vaulting of this chapel, traces survive of a fresco made by Antonio Carboni, partly hidden by later plaster dating from the early 20th century. In the last chapel on the left, which is dedicated to the Sacred Heart, is the cabinet of the Eucharist.

== Paintings ==
Inside the chancel is a painting of the fallen Christ being mourned by angels, long attributed to Alessandro Tiarini, but eventually this attribution was rejected, and the work is now reported as by an unknown early nineteenth-century neoclassical painter. The rest of the paintings belong to the Sardinian school of the 19th and 20th centuries.

== Festival of the Redeemer ==
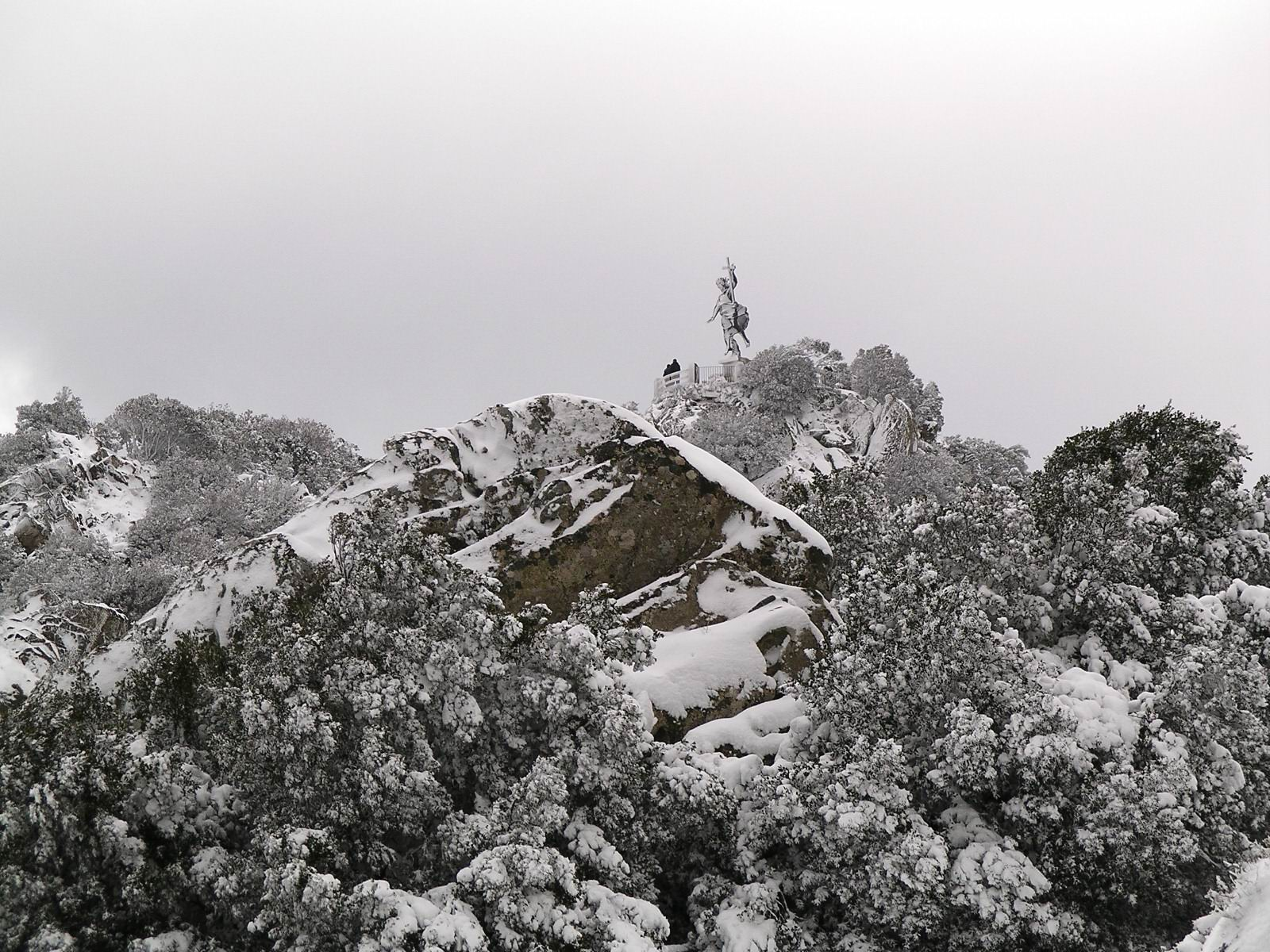
Statue of Christ the Redeemer, Ortobene

The festival of the Redeemer began at Nuoro in 1901, when a bronze statue of Christ the Redeemer was erected on top of Monte Ortobene at the initiative of Pope Leo XIII, who had wished to celebrate the new century with nineteen statues of the Redeemer in nineteen regions. Made on the mainland, the statue arrived by ship in Cagliari on 15 August 1901, in pieces. These arrived in Nuoro on 19 August and on the 29th were transported to the mountain-top by six ox-drawn carts. Re-assembled, the statue was more than four meters high and weighed more than twenty quintals (44,000 pounds). Bishop Salvatore Demartis organized the inauguration of the statue and invited the whole of Sardinia.

On 29 August of each year since then, the cathedral's congregation makes a pilgrimage to the statue of the Redeemer on top of Ortobene. A solemn mass is celebrated which concludes the local festival. There is a parade of traditional costumes, with singing and dancing, in which all the villages of Sardinia take part. Traditional attires of the island are most displayed by this time of the year.

== Gallery ==
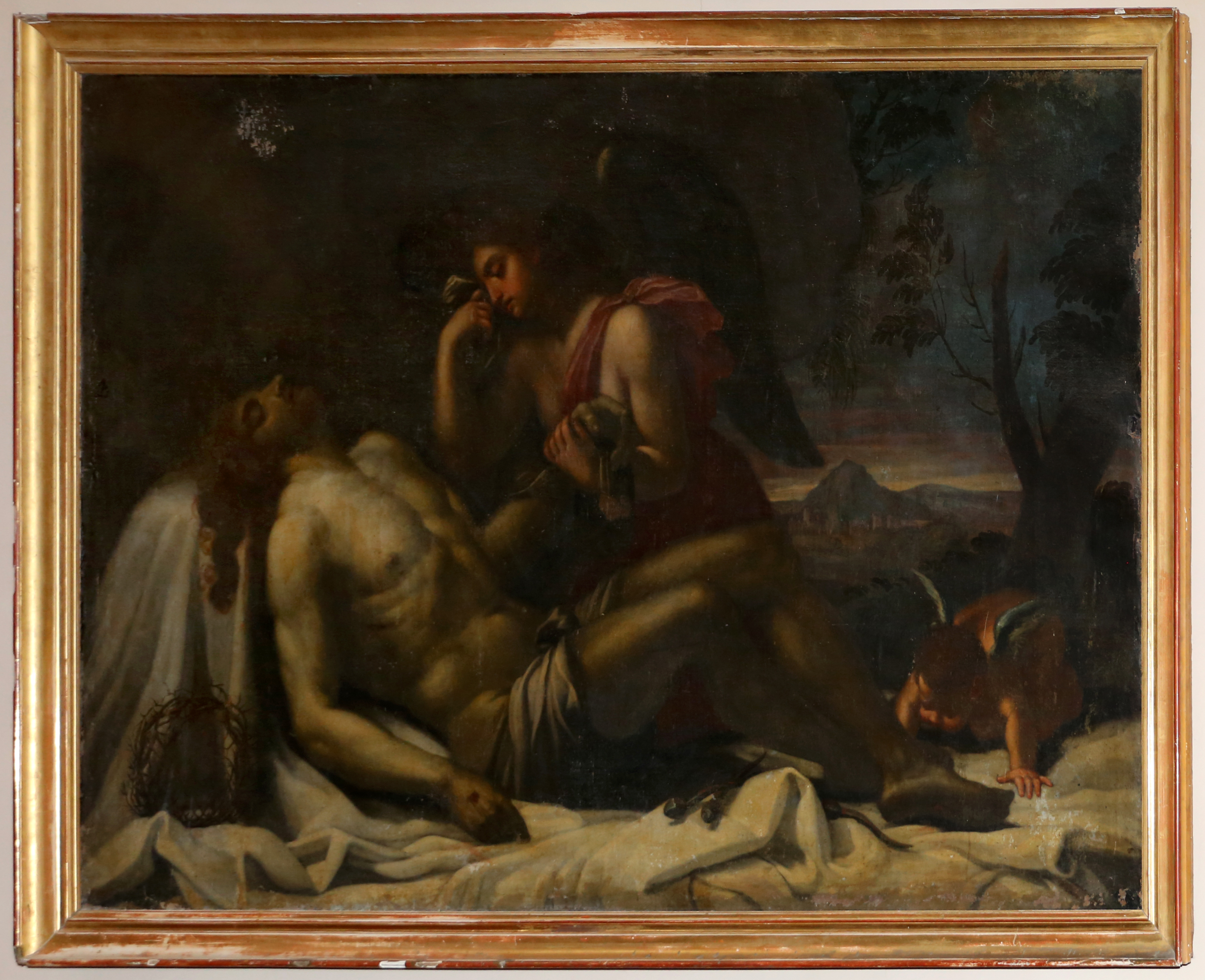
The fallen Christ mourned by angels, c. 1810

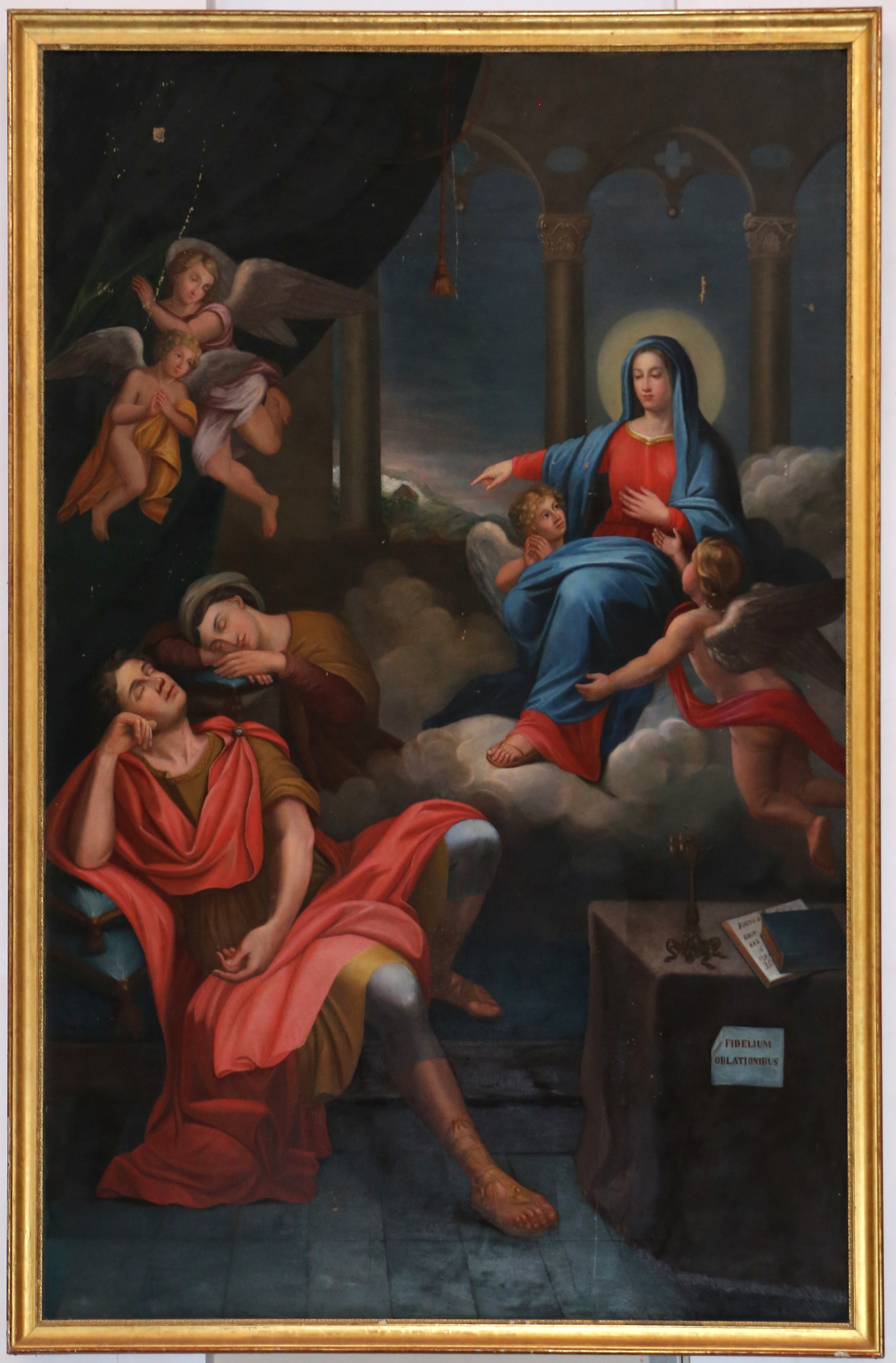
Dream of St John, 1935

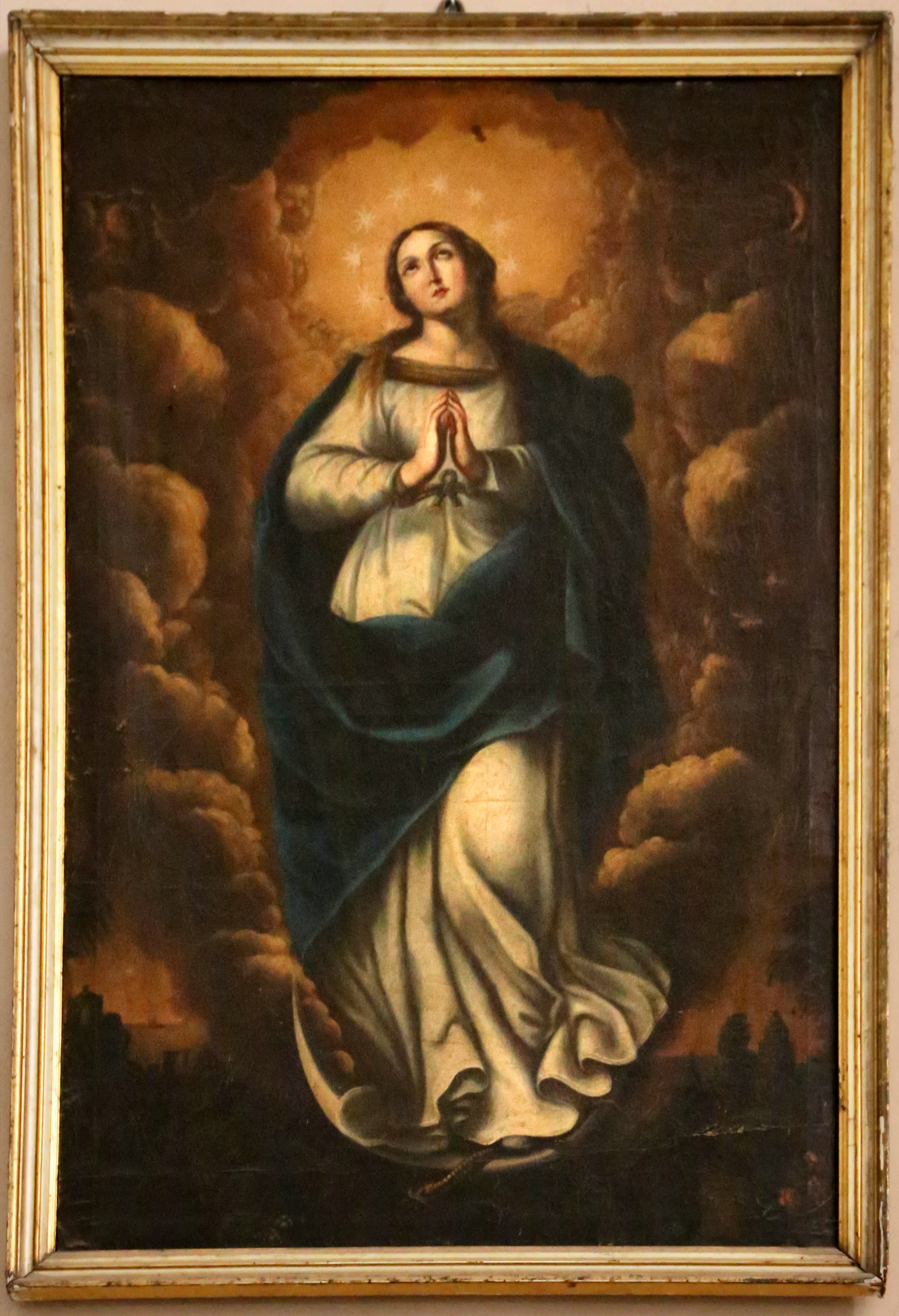
The Immaculate Conception

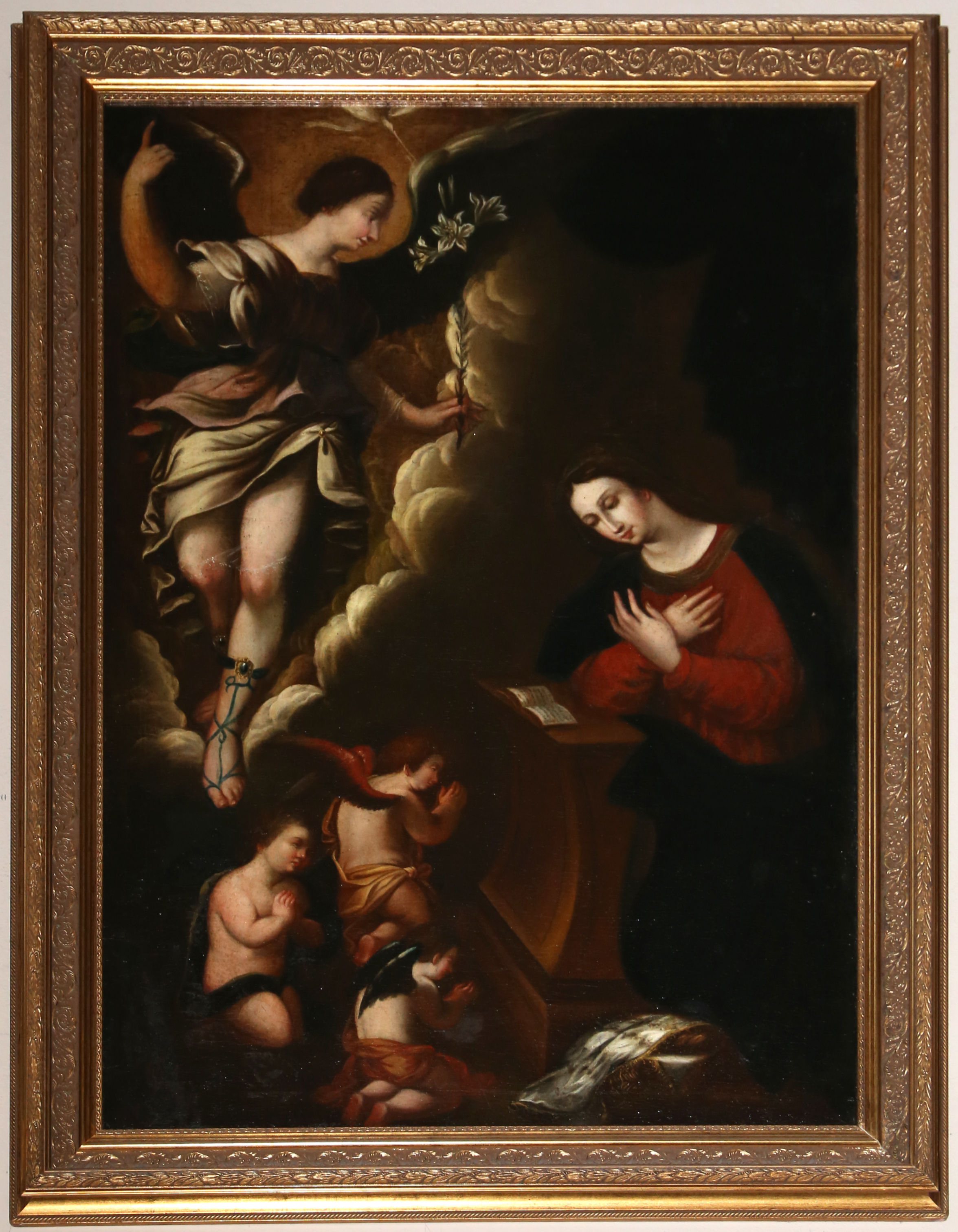
The Annunciation

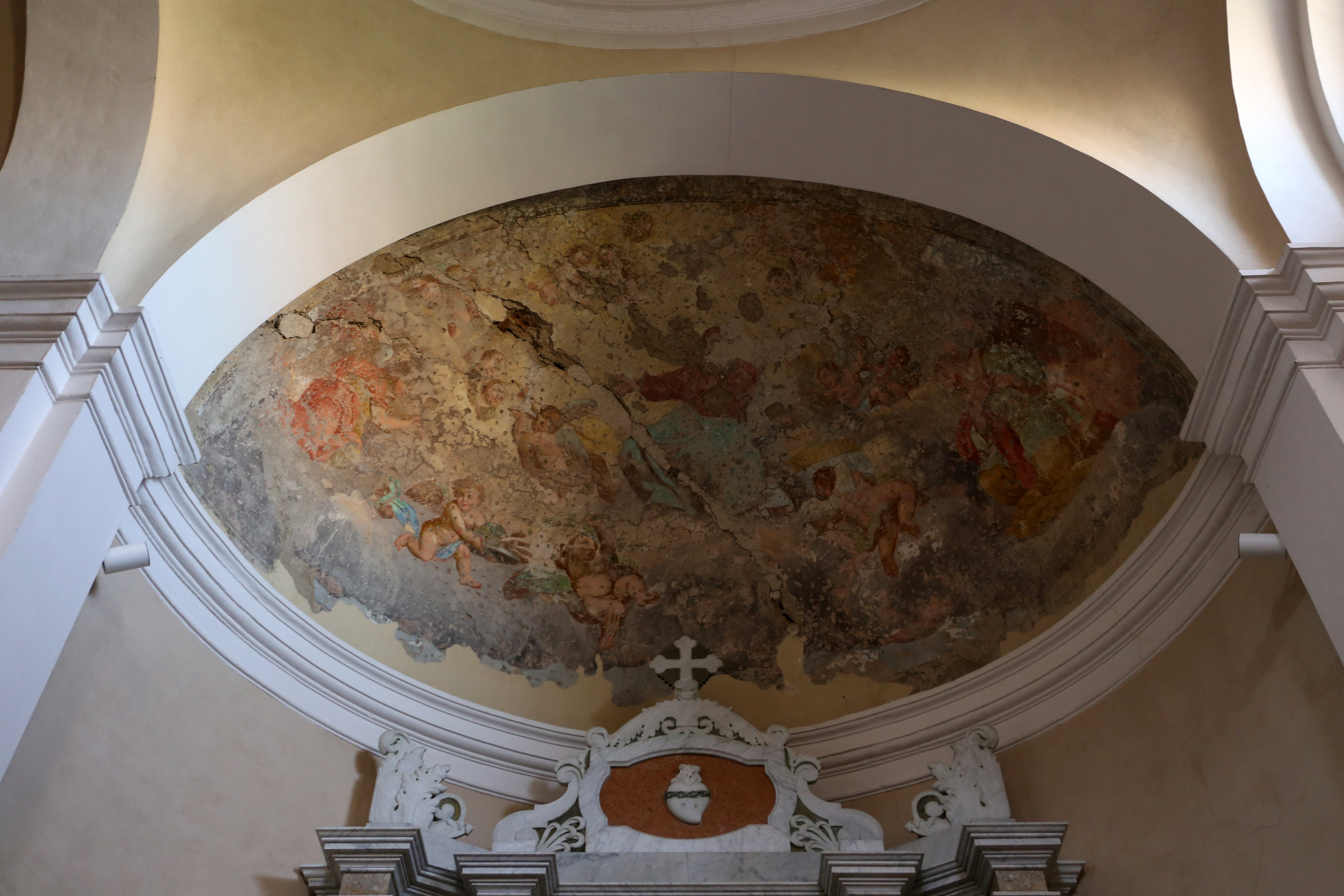
Fresco of the Assumption

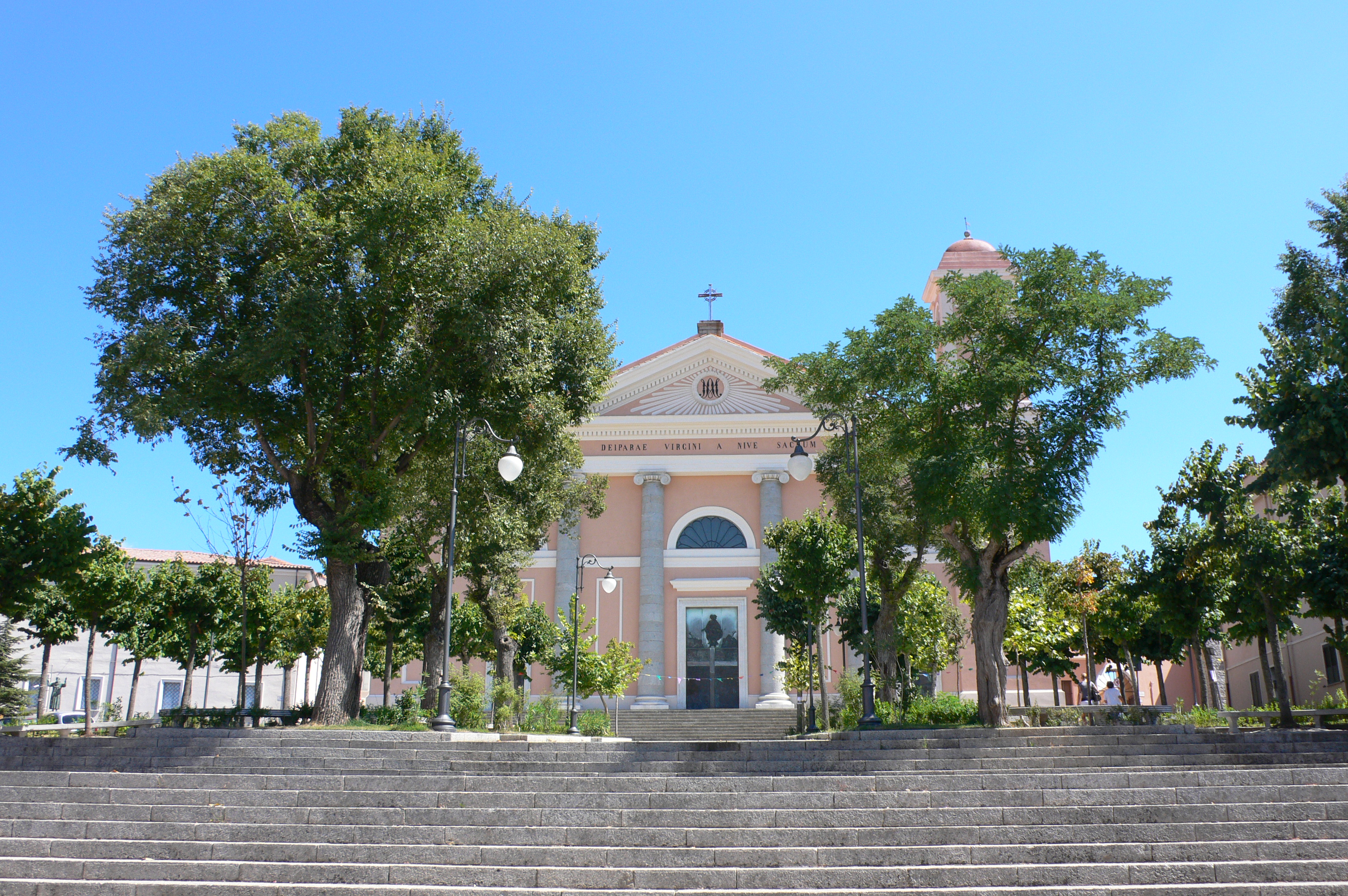
View across the piazza

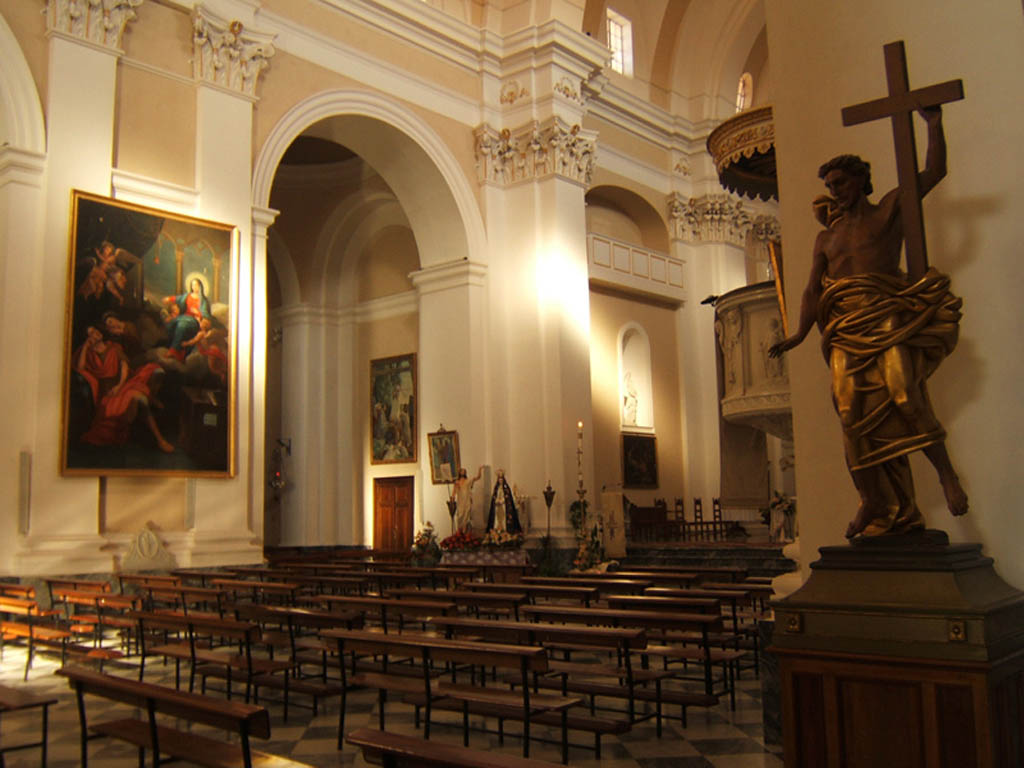
Looking across the nave

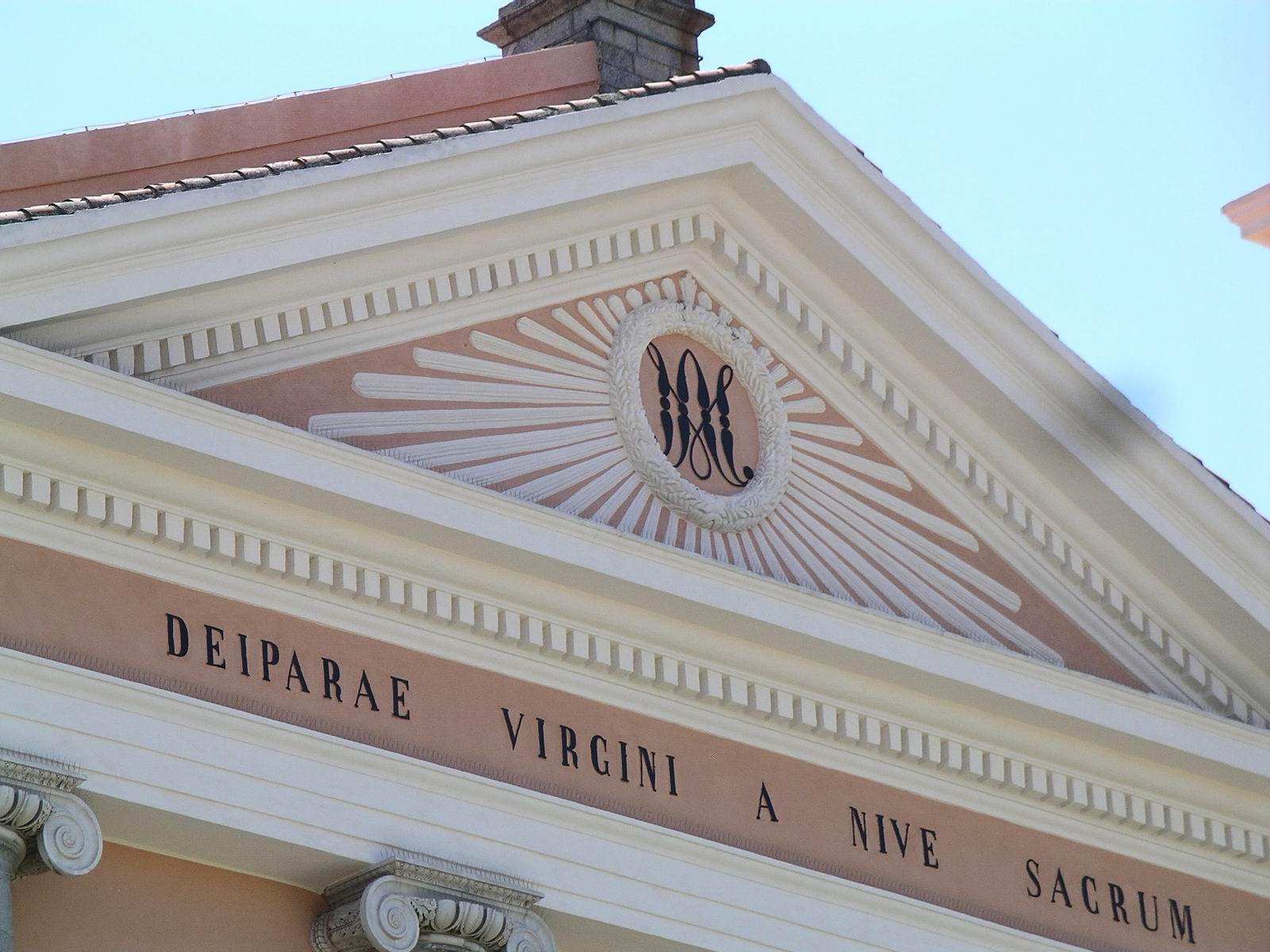
The tympanum
