= Sardinian Ethnographic Museum =

- Instituto Etnografico della Sardegna
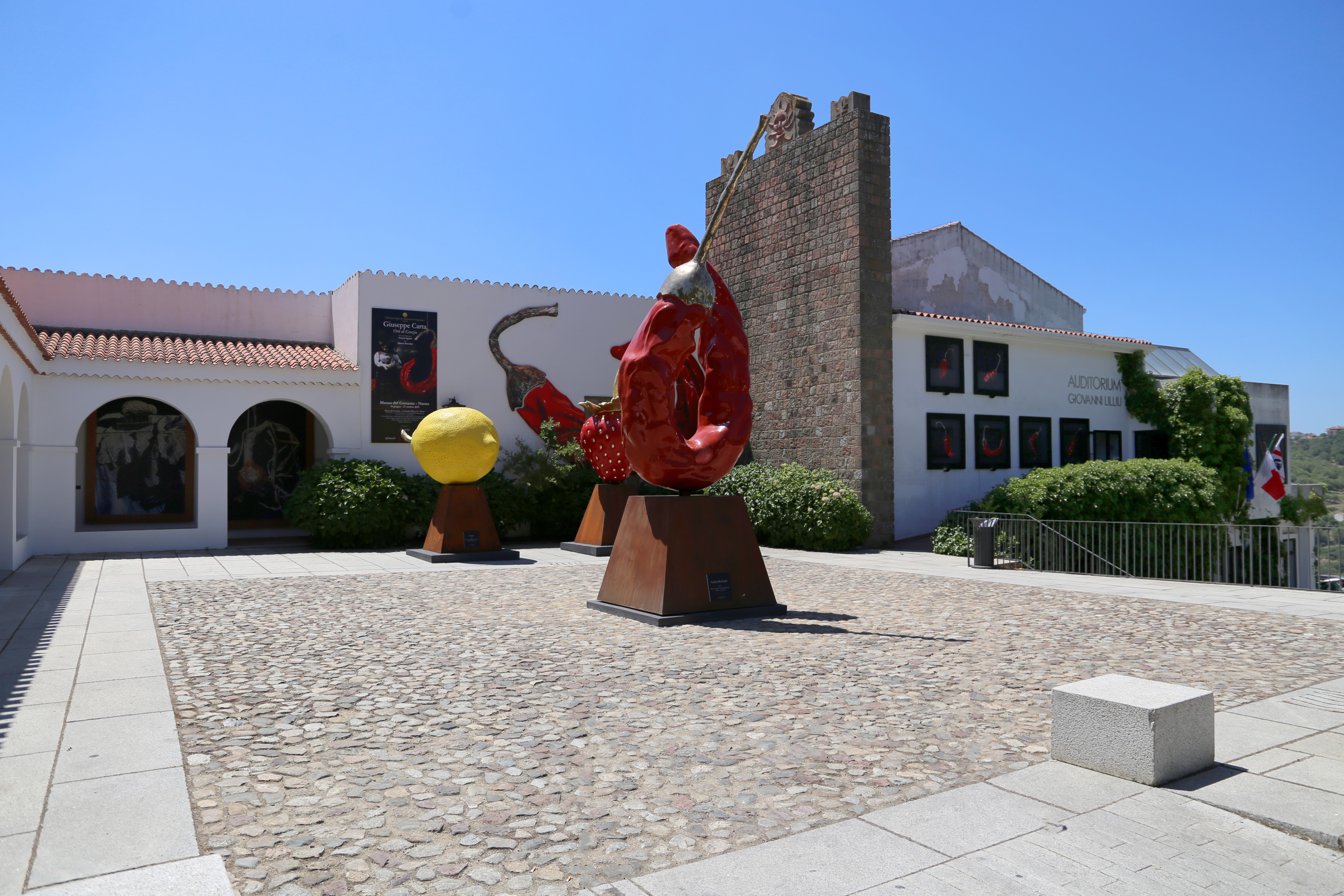

- Location within Sardinia
- Established: 1976
- Location: Via Antonio Mereu, 08100 Nuoro, Italy
- Coordinates: 40.3169°N 9.3355°E
- Type: Ethnographic museum
- Collection size: 8,000
- Visitors: 28,000 per year
- Website: ISRE

The Sardinian Ethnographic Museum (Italian: Istituto Etnografico della Sardegna), is an ethnographic museum in Nuoro, Sardinia. Its goal is to display the traditional life of the island's people.

== History ==
The museum building was built between the 1950s and the 1960s on the it:Colle di Sant'Onofrio, designed by architect it:Antonio Simon Mossa to resemble an imaginary Sardinian village.

== Collection ==
The museum exhibits show all aspects of the material culture of the traditional Sardinian including clothes, jewels, weapons, masks, traditional musical instruments, work and domestic tools. The collection includes over 8000 items, most of them belonging to the period between the end of the 19th century and the first half of the 20th century.

Included in the collection are traditional male and female outfits, around 80 in total; each of them representing a different village in Sardinia. These outfits are authentic and were in everyday use until they were acquired by the museum.
