= Ortobene =

Mountain in Italy

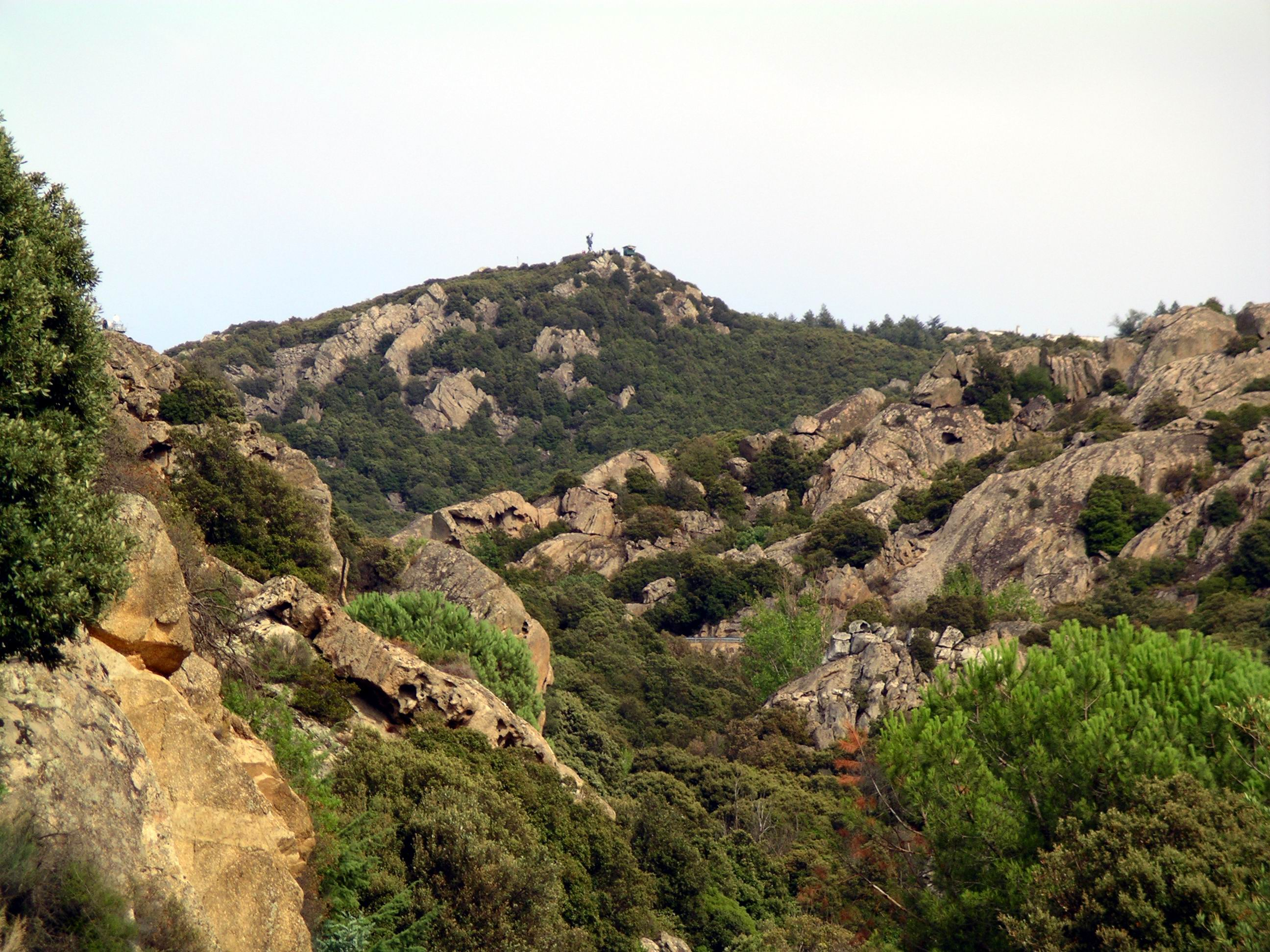

Highest point
- Elevation: 955 m (3,133 ft)
- Coordinates: 40°19′16.79″N 9°22′16.61″E

Geography
- Location within Italy
- Location: Sardinia, Italy

Mount Ortobene (Orthobene in the local dialect) is a mountain in the province of Nuoro, in central Sardinia, Italy, close to the town of Nuoro.

There are two main parks: "Sedda Ortai" and "Il Redentore". At the feet of the mountain is a nuraghe archaeological area including the Domus de janas tombs. On the mountain's top is the bronze "Statue of Christ the Redeemer" by Vincenzo Jerace (1901).

Flora of the Ortobene include mostly holm oaks, while wildlife include Sardinian wild boar, weasel, marten, garden dormouse, Sardinian fox, European hare, Barbary partridge, great and lesser spotted woodpecker, Eurasian jay, blue rock-thrush, wood pigeon, Dartford warbler, goshawk, Eurasian sparrowhawk, common kestrel, peregrine falcon and golden eagle.

Grazia Deledda, Nobel Prize in Literature in 1926, wrote about Mount Ortobene:

No, it's not true that the Ortobene can be compared to other mountains; there's only one Ortobene in the whole world: it's our heart, it's our soul, our character, everything big and small, kind and tough and rough and sorrowful in us.
