= Lollove =

Human settlement in Nuoro, Italy

Lollove is a village in the Sardinia. It is a frazione of the comune of Nuoro, in the province of Nuoro. It is one of I Borghi più belli d'Italia ("The most beautiful villages of Italy").

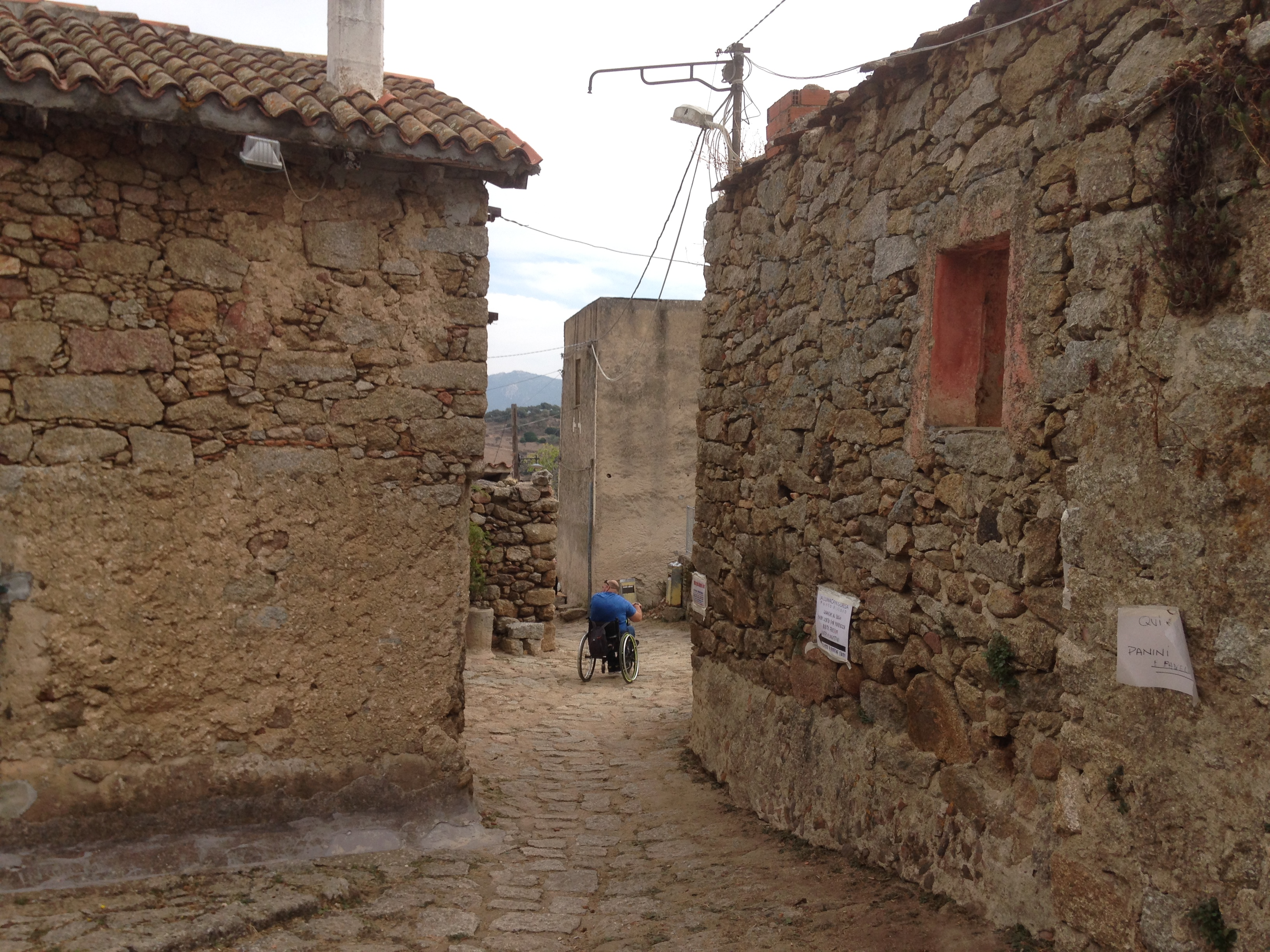
Lollove

It is characterized by a very small resident population, 26 inhabitants in 2009, and by the persistence of houses and ruins that have remained unchanged for centuries. The drastic depopulation of the town occurred in the first half of the 1960s; previously, there were a nursery school and elementary schools, testifying to the significant presence of children.

== Economy ==
The area is dependent on tourism.
