= Nuoro =

Nuoro Nùgoro (Sardinian)
- Comune
- Comune di Nuoro
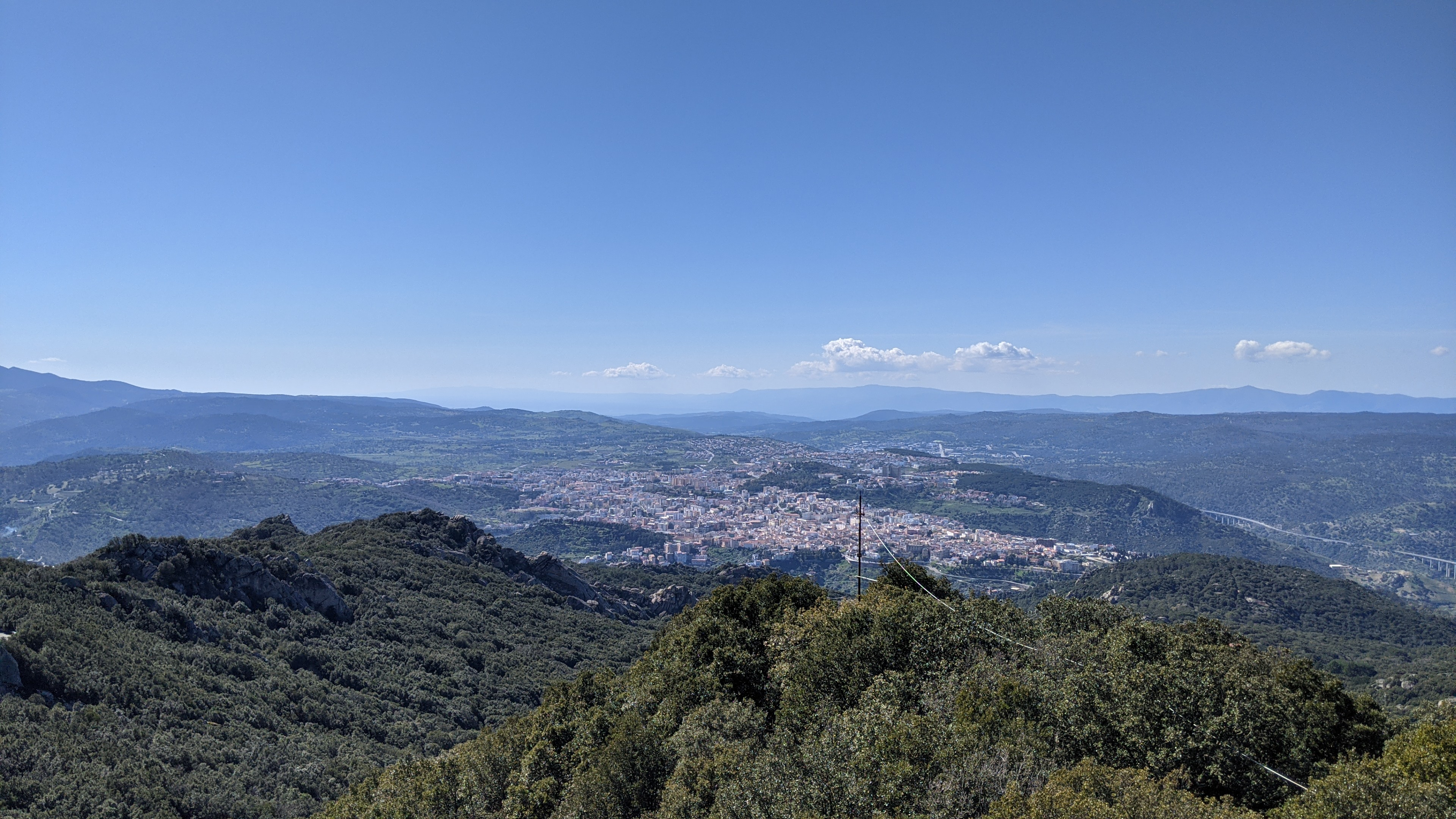
- View of Nuoro

- Flag Coat of arms

- Location within Sardinia
- Coordinates: 40°19′N 09°20′E
- Country: Italy
- Region: Sardinia
- Province: Nuoro (NU)
- Frazioni: Lollove

Government
  - Mayor: Emiliano Fenu (M5S)

Area
  - Total: 192.06 km^{2} (74.15 sq mi)
- Elevation: 554 m (1,818 ft)

Population (2026)
  - Total: 32,718
  - Density: 170.35/km^{2} (441.21/sq mi)
- Demonyms: Nuoresi; Nugoresos
- Time zone: UTC+1 (CET)
  - Summer (DST): UTC+2 (CEST)
- Postal code: 08100
- Dialing code: 0784
- Patron saint: Santa Maria della Neve
- Saint day: 5 August
- Website: Official website

Nuoro (Italian pronunciation: [ˈnuːoro] or less correctly [ˈnwɔːro]; Sardinian: Nùgoro [ˈnuɣɔɾɔ]) (Note: Probably from a root meaning 'home' or 'hearth' in Logudorese.) is a town and comune (municipality) in central-eastern Sardinia in Italy, situated on the slopes of Mount Ortobene. It is the capital and largest city of the province of Nuoro. With a population of 32,718, it is the sixth-largest municipality in Sardinia. Its frazione (borough) of Lollove is one of I Borghi più belli d'Italia ("The most beautiful villages of Italy").

As the birthplace of several renowned artists, including writers, poets, painters and sculptors, Nuoro hosts some of the most important museums in Sardinia. It is considered an important cultural center of the region and it has been referred to as the "Sardinian Athens". Nuoro is the hometown of Grazia Deledda, the only Italian woman to be awarded the Nobel Prize in Literature.

== History ==
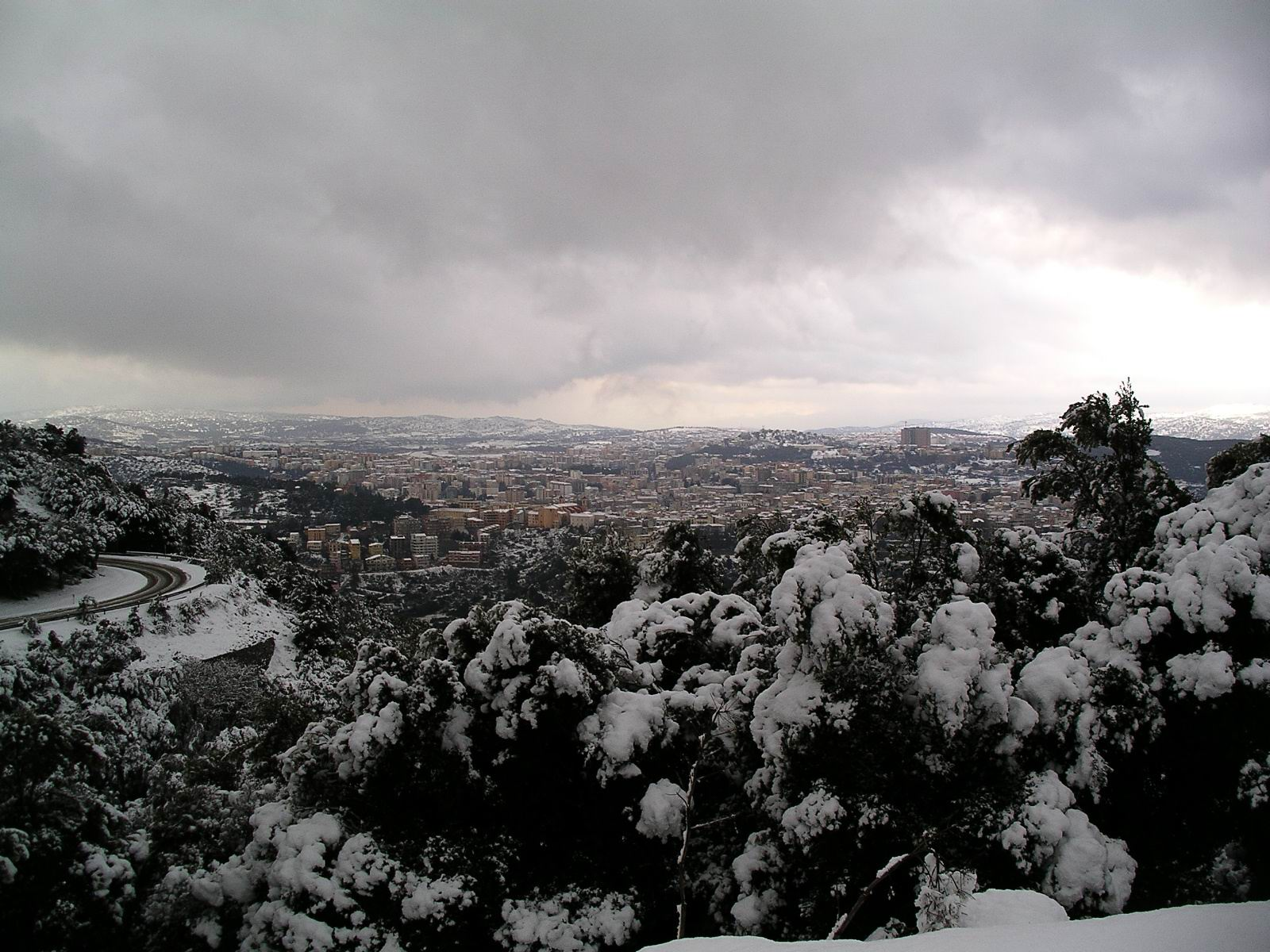
View of Nuoro in winter from Monte Ortobene.

The earliest traces of human settlement in the Nuoro area (called "the Nuorese") are the so-called Domus de janas, rock-cut tombs dated at the third millennium BC. However, fragments of ceramics of the Ozieri culture have also been discovered and dated at c. 3500 BC.

The Nuorese was a centre of the Nuragic civilization, which developed in Sardinia from c. 1500 BC to c. 250 BC. More than 30 Nuragic sites have been discovered in the area, including a village discovered in the countryside of Tanca Manna, just outside Nuoro, which comprised over 150 huts.

The Nuorese was crossed by a Roman road which connected Karalis (Cagliari) to Ulbia (Olbia). The legacy of the Roman colonization can especially be found in the variety of the Sardinian language which is still spoken today in Nuoro: Nuorese Sardinian is considered the most conservative dialect of Sardinian, which is in turn the most conservative Romance language.

After the fall of the Western Roman Empire, Sardinia was held first by the Vandals and then by the Byzantines. According to the letters of Pope Gregory I, a Romanized and Christianized culture (that of the provinciales) co-existed with several Pagan cultures (those of the Gens Barbaricina, i.e. "Barbarian People") mainly located in the island's interior. As the Byzantine control waned, the Judicates appeared. A small village known as Nugor appears on a medieval map from 1147. In the two following centuries it grew to more than 1000 inhabitants. Nuoro remained a town of average importance under the Aragonese and Spanish domination of Sardinia, until famine and plague struck it in the late 17th century.

After the annexation to the Kingdom of Sardinia, the town became the administrative center of the area, obtaining the title of city in 1836.

== Climate ==
Climate data for Nuoro (1981–2010)
Month	Jan	Feb	Mar	Apr	May	Jun	Jul	Aug	Sep	Oct	Nov	Dec	Year
Mean daily maximum °C (°F)	9.7 (49.5)	10.2 (50.4)	13.2 (55.8)	15.9 (60.6)	21.7 (71.1)	27.8 (82.0)	32.9 (91.2)	32.0 (89.6)	26.1 (79.0)	21.2 (70.2)	14.6 (58.3)	10.4 (50.7)	19.6 (67.3)
Daily mean °C (°F)	6.6 (43.9)	6.8 (44.2)	9.1 (48.4)	11.4 (52.5)	16.3 (61.3)	21.3 (70.3)	25.6 (78.1)	25.4 (77.7)	20.7 (69.3)	16.6 (61.9)	11.0 (51.8)	7.5 (45.5)	14.9 (58.7)
Mean daily minimum °C (°F)	3.4 (38.1)	3.3 (37.9)	4.9 (40.8)	6.8 (44.2)	10.8 (51.4)	14.8 (58.6)	18.2 (64.8)	18.7 (65.7)	15.3 (59.5)	12.0 (53.6)	7.4 (45.3)	4.5 (40.1)	10.0 (50.0)
Average precipitation mm (inches)	73.9 (2.91)	56.5 (2.22)	52.3 (2.06)	65.8 (2.59)	40.7 (1.60)	20.4 (0.80)	9.5 (0.37)	20.6 (0.81)	47.0 (1.85)	61.0 (2.40)	75.7 (2.98)	91.2 (3.59)	614.6 (24.20)
Source: Sistema nazionale protezione ambiente

== Demographics ==
Historical population
Year	Pop.	±%
1861	4,827	—
1871	5,472	+13.4%
1881	6,099	+11.5%
1901	7,051	+15.6%
1911	7,248	+2.8%
1921	8,534	+17.7%
1931	9,188	+7.7%
1936	11,459	+24.7%
1951	16,949	+47.9%
1961	23,033	+35.9%
1971	31,033	+34.7%
1981	35,779	+15.3%
1991	37,527	+4.9%
2001	36,678	−2.3%
2011	36,674	−0.0%
2021	34,183	−6.8%
Source: ISTAT

As of 2026, the population is 32,718, of which 47.9% are male, and 52.1% are female. Minors make up 11.6% of the population, and seniors make up 29.2%.

=== Immigration ===
As of 2025, immigrants make up 4.7% of the population. The 5 largest foreign countries of birth are Romania, Senegal, France, Germany, and Morocco.

Foreign population by country of birth (2025)
Country	Population
Romania	300
Senegal	231
France	110
Germany	99
Morocco	85
China	76
Pakistan	55
Belgium	53
Argentina	45
Nigeria	32
Switzerland	31
Chile	27
Bangladesh	26
Colombia	19
Tunisia	19

== Culture ==
=== ISRE ===
Since 1972 in Nuoro is active the Istituto superiore regionale etnografico (ISRE), which is an institution that promotes the study and documentation of the social and cultural life of Sardinia in its traditional manifestations and its transformations. In fact, in addition to managing museums and libraries, it organizes national and international events, including: the Sardinia International Ethnographic Film Festival (SIEFF) and the Festival Biennale Italiano dell’Etnografia (ETNU) (Italian Biennial Festival of Ethnography).

=== Museums ===
- Sardinian Ethnographic Museum (Museo Etnografico Sardo).
- Grazia Deledda's Museum (Museo Deleddiano).
- M.A.N., Museo d’Arte Provincia di Nuoro (Modern Art Museum of the Nuoro Province).
- National Archaeological Museum of Nuoro (Museo Archeologico Nazionale di Nuoro).
- Museo Ciusa, Museum dedicated to Francesco Ciusa and other artists
- Spazio Ilisso
- Museum of Ceramics (Museo della Ceramica)

=== Monuments and historical sites ===
Map of Nuoro historical center

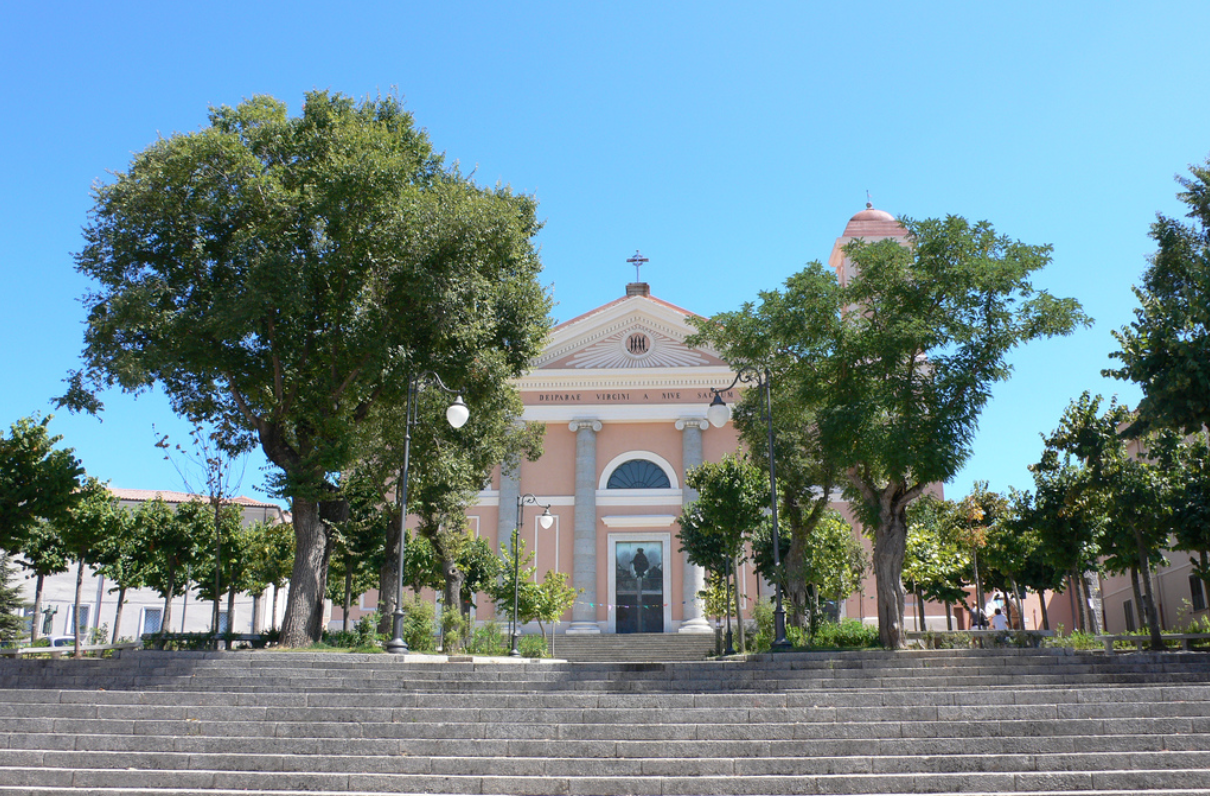
Nuoro Cathedral

- Nuoro Cathedral (Cattedrale di Santa Maria della Neve)
- Piazza Sebastiano Satta
- Chiesa di Nostra Signora delle Grazie
- Chiesa della Solitudine
- The Redeemer's statue, Monte Ortobene, the 7 meters tall Vincenzo Gerace's bronze statue installed 29 August 1901.
- Nuraghe Ugolio
- Chiesa di San Carlo, church built in the 17th century containing a copy of Francesco Ciusa's masterpiece La madre dell'ucciso.
- Sas Birghines, Domus de Janas located in Monte Ortobene
- Sanctuary Madonna of Montenero, Monte Ortobene

=== Language ===
Along with Italian, the traditional language spoken in Nuoro is Sardinian, in its Logudorese-Nuorese variety.

=== Food ===
Nuoro is home to the world's rarest pasta, su filindeu. The name in Sardinian language means "the threads (or wool) of God" and is made exclusively by the women of a single family in the town, with the recipe being passed down through generations.

=== Cultural international events ===
- Sardinia International Ethnographic Film Festival

== Transport ==
=== Road ===
Nuoro is served by the SS 131 DCN (Olbia-Abbasanta), the SS 129 (Orosei-Macomer), and the SS 389 (Monti-Lanusei).

=== Bus ===
ARST, Azienda Regionale Sarda Trasporti provide regular connections to Cagliari, Sassari, Olbia, and to several minor centres in the province and the region.

Other private operators (including Deplano Autolinee, Turmotravel, Redentours) connects Nuoro to various cities and airports in the island.

=== Rail ===
Nuoro is connected by train to Macomer via Ferrovie della Sardegna.

=== Local transportation ===
ATP Nuoro's bus system provides service within the city.

== Notable people ==
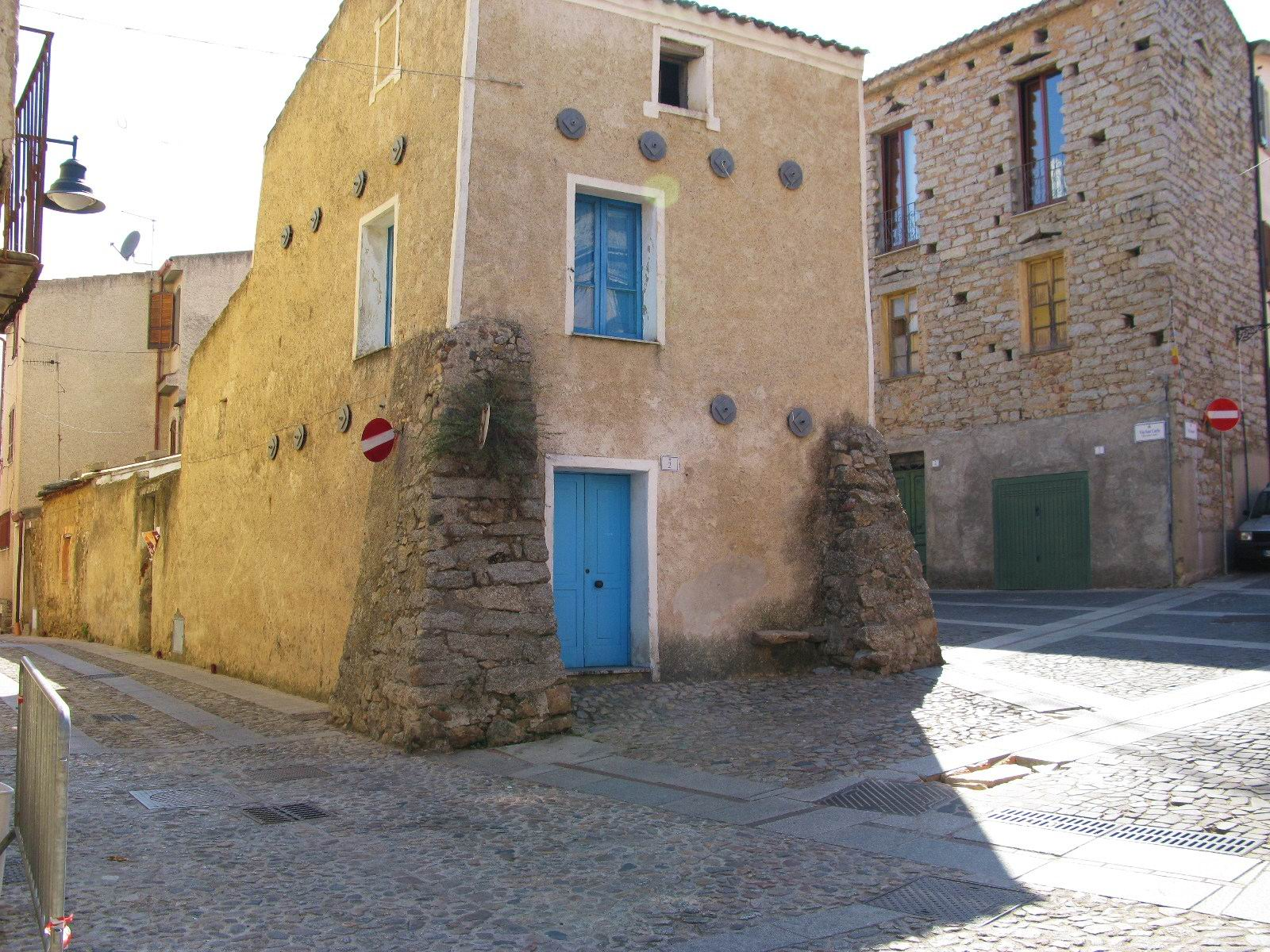
Casa dei Contrafforti, Nuoro's Old Town

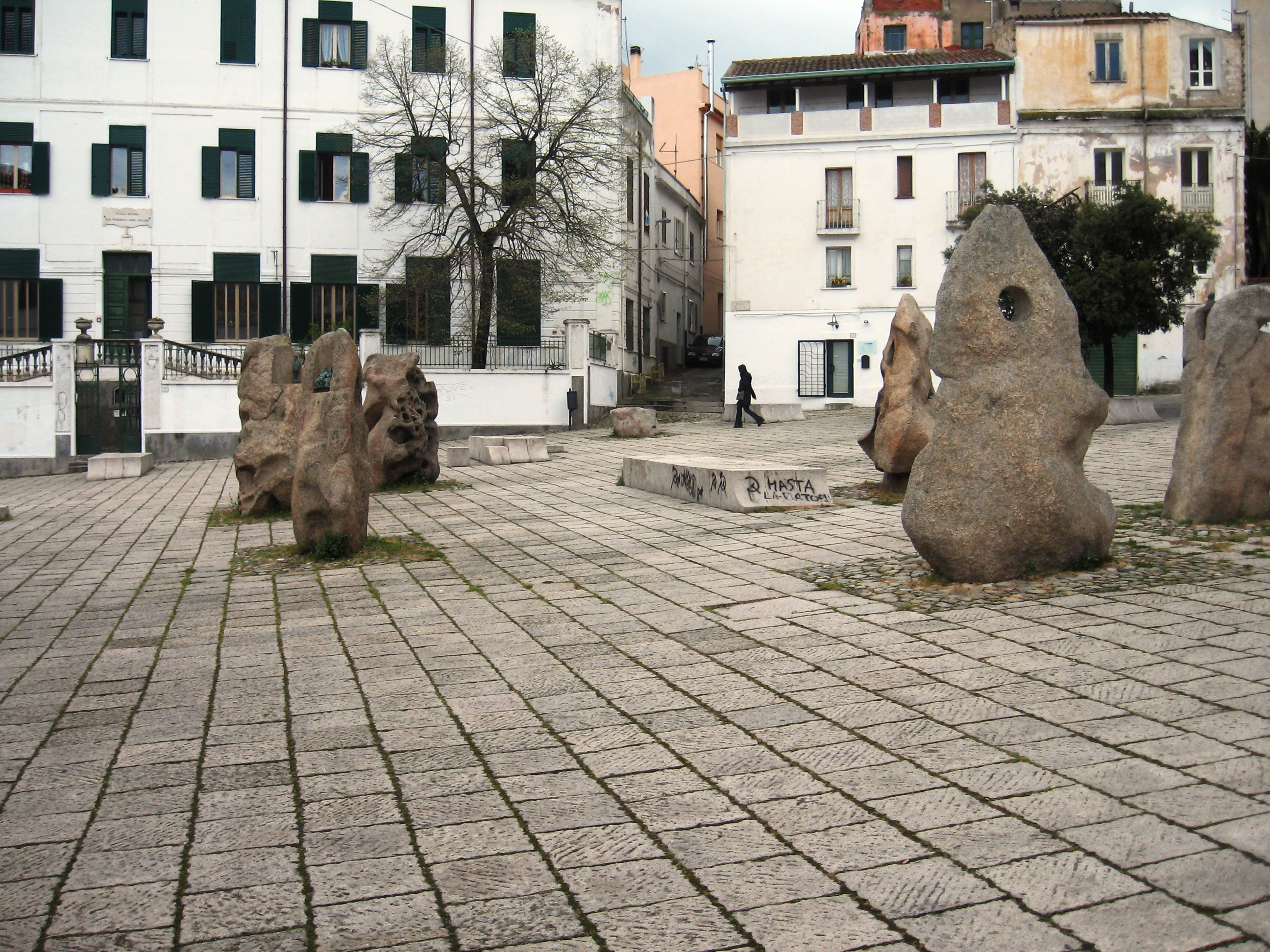
Nivola's sculptures in Piazza Sebastiano Satta, Nuoro

- Sebastiano Satta (1867–1914), poet, lawyer
- Grazia Deledda (1871–1936), writer, winner Nobel Prize
- Francesco Ciusa (1883–1949), sculptor, winner of the Venice Biennale
- Adelasia Cocco (1885–1983), Health Officer in Nuoro, possibly the first female doctor in Italy
- Attilio Deffenu (1890–1918), trade unionist
- Salvatore Satta (1902–1975), jurist, writer
- Sebastiano Mannironi (1930–2015), athlete. Olympic games medal winner.
- Franco Oppo (1935–2016), composer
- Marcello Fois (born 1960), writer
- Flavio Manzoni (born 1967), car designer
- Gianfranco Zola (born 1966), footballer
- Salvatore Sirigu (born 1987), footballer

== International relations ==
=== Twin towns – sister cities ===
- Corte, France
- Tolmezzo, Italy
