= Giuseppe Biasi =

Italian painter (1885–1945)

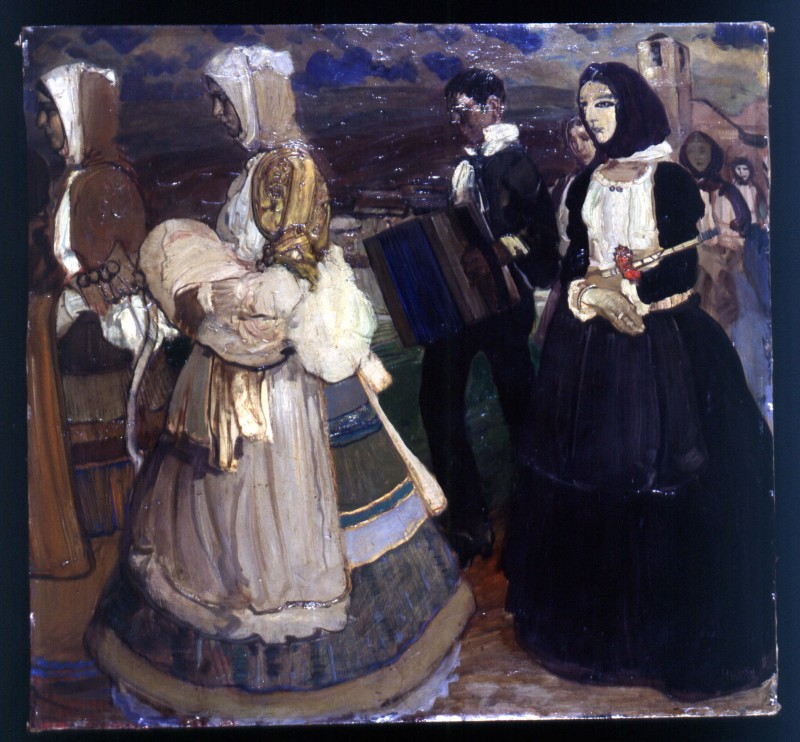
Battesimo sardo, 1912–1915 (Art collections of Fondazione Cariplo)

Giuseppe Biasi (1885–1945) was an Italian painter.

== Biography ==
He was born in Sassari. While pursuing classical studies in accordance with his family’s wishes, Biasi became well known in his hometown for caricatures published in local humorous journals when he was still very young. His drawings kept up to date with the latest French and above all Mitteleuropean models and achieved considerable success also beyond the national borders. He contributed to the most important Italian magazines of the period, including L'Illustrazione Italiana, Avanti della Domenica and Il Giornalino della Domenica, and finally established himself as the illustrator of Grazia Deledda, with whom he shared a determination to assert the specific values of Sardinian culture in post-unification Italy. He also began painting, primarily folkloristic depictions of his homeland but informed by an awareness of the latest developments in European painting, with which he came into contact very early through the shows of the Secessione Romana movement and the Venice Biennale, where he made his debut at the Esposizione Internazionale d’Arte della Città di Venezia in 1909. Participation in exhibitions in Rome and Milan was interrupted only for the short period when he served as a volunteer in World War I. The period 1924–1926 saw a number of journeys to North Africa in search of ways to revitalise his means of expression. Biasi developed an interest in decoration and experimented with mosaic and fresco techniques a few years before his death in 1945, in Andorno Micca.

== Other projects ==
Media related to Giuseppe Biasi at Wikimedia Commons
