= Francesco Ciusa =

Italian sculptor

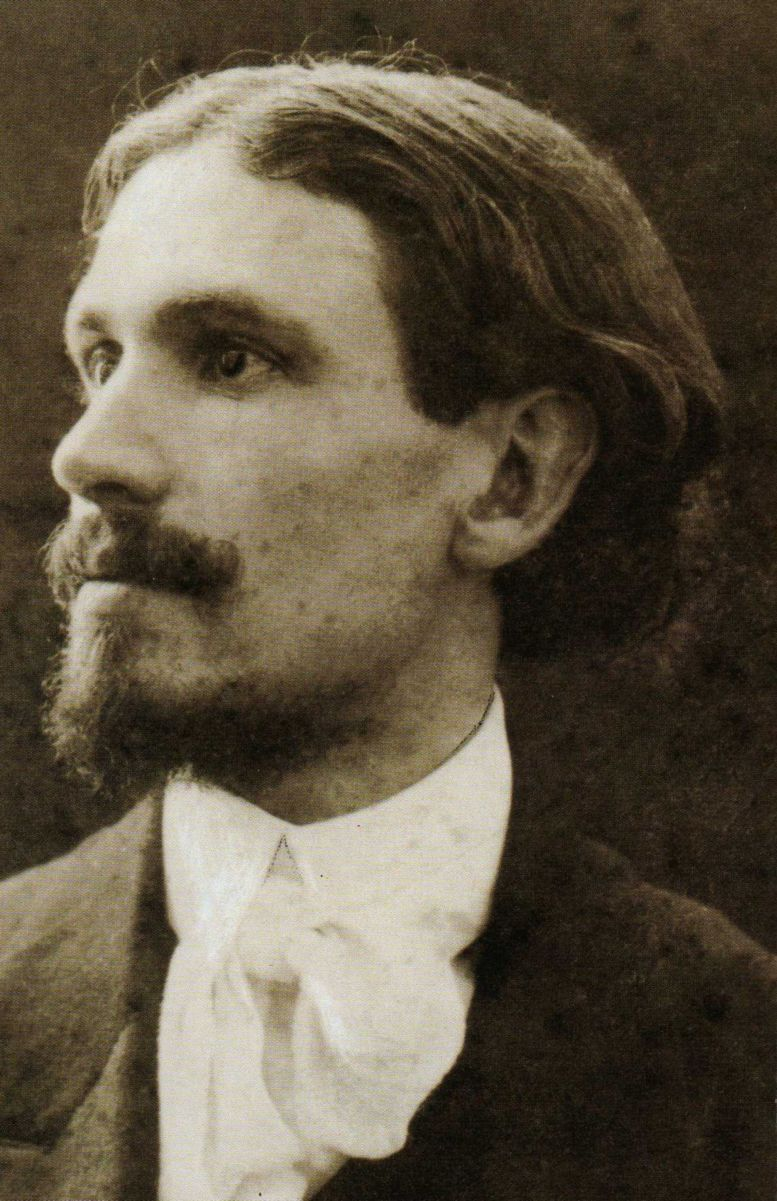
Francesco Ciusa

Francesco Ciusa (1883 in Nuoro – 1949 in Cagliari) was an Italian sculptor.

== Biography ==
Born in the town of Nuoro, on the island of Sardinia in Italy, his father was an Ébéniste, or cabinet maker. He attended the Academy of Fine Arts in Florence from 1899 to 1903, where he had as teachers affirmed artists such as Adolfo De Carolis, the sculptor Domenico Trentacoste and the master of the Macchiaioli's movement Giovanni Fattori.

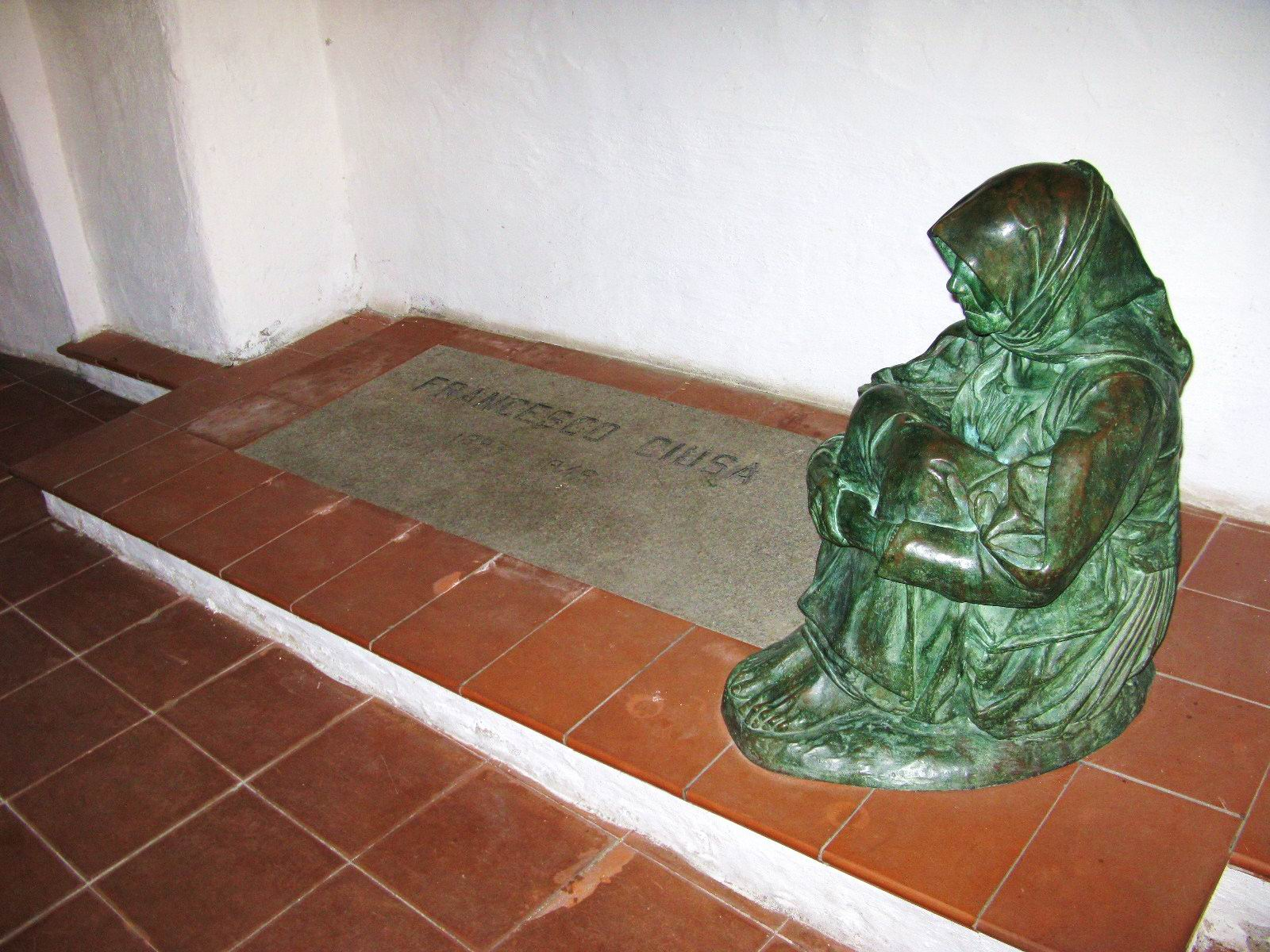
The Ciusa's grave decorated with one of his sculptures

He moved to Sassari Sardinia in 1904, where he knew famous artists like Giuseppe Biasi then returned to his hometown Nuoro in 1905.

He won the first prize at the Biennale di Venezia with the sculpture La madre dell'ucciso. Five copies of the sculpture were realised, one in bronze is today exhibited at the Galleria Nazionale d'Arte Moderna in Rome, and another one in plaster is exhibited at Galleria comunale d'arte in Cagliari.

In 1913 he worked on the completion of the Cagliari's City Hall, together the artists Mario Delitala, Felice Melis and Filippo Figari. In 1923, he focused on the production of small ceramics. In 1924 he opened a School of Art in Oristano. In 1928 he exhibited a sculpture for the second time at the Venice Biennale.

In March 1937 he began to write his autobiography, describing his memories and visions as a child, and the ideal path of his works in the background of an ancient world. In 1943 he was professor of design at the faculty of engineering at the University of Cagliari. He died in Cagliari in 1949.

== Bibliography ==
- Giuliana Altea, Francesco Ciusa, Ilisso, 2004, testo disponibile online (.pdf)
- Giuliana Altea e Marco Magnani (storico dell'arte), Pittura e scultura dal 1930 al 1960, collana "Storia dell'arte in Sardegna", Ilisso per Fondazione Banco di Sardegna, 2000
- Remo Branca, La vita nell'arte di Francesco Ciusa, Editrice Sarda Fossataro, Cagliari, 1975.
- Rossana Bossaglia, Francesco Ciusa, Ilisso, Nuoro, 1990.
- F. Spano Satta, Il monumento nuorese a Sebastiano Satta (intervista con Francesco Ciusa), in L'Isola, Sassari, 28 gennaio 1931
- Francesco Ciusa, Una lettera di Francesco Ciusa ne L'Unione Sarda, Cagliari, 18 gennaio 1944
