= Peter Dalglish =

Canadian philanthropist and sex offender

- Born: Peter John Dalglish; May 20, 1957 (age 69); London, Ontario
- Education: Stanford University, Dalhousie University
- Occupation: Founder of Street Kids International
- Notable work: The Courage of Children: My Life with the World's Poorest Kids
- Criminal charges: Sexual abuse of a minor
- Criminal penalty: 9 years in jail
- Criminal status: Incarcerated at Dhulikhel jail
- Spouse: Nienke Schaape (divorced)

Peter Dalglish (born May 20, 1957) is the Canadian founder of the Street Kids International charity and a convicted child sex offender. Until 2015, he was the Country Representative for UN-Habitat in Afghanistan.

== Personal life ==
Dalglish was born in London, Ontario.

Dalglish attended Upper Canada College, where he later also taught. He graduated from Stanford University and then from Dalhousie Law School in 1983. Dalglish was called to the Bar in 1985 after articling with Stewart MacKeen & Covert. He worked briefly in the Prime Minister's Office for Pierre Trudeau.

Trudeau appointed Dalglish the first director of Youth Service International. He also served as an advisor to Dubai Cares and the AWR Lloyd Foundation.

He was married for five years to Nienke Schaap, and they have a daughter together.

== Work ==
=== Ethiopia and Sudan ===
Dalglish organized an airlift of food and medical supplies from Canada to Ethiopia in December 1984 along with University of King's College president John Godfrey. The experience convinced him to leave his law career and return to Africa to work with poor children.

Dalglish joined the World University Service of Canada (WUSC) to work in Darfur Sudan, where he organized humanitarian relief for women and children displaced by severe drought and famine. In the late 1980s, Dalglish through Street Kids International arranged to rehabilitate and equip children's schools in southern Sudan as part of Operation Lifeline and hired Emma McCune to run the project.

In 1986, Dalglish was reassigned to run the World Food Programme Road Transportation Operation in Khartoum, Sudan. After catching a child breaking into his vehicle using a bent nail, Dalglish convinced a Belgian technical training school to provide auto mechanic training to street children, funded with $50,000 from Bob Geldof. In 1987, Dalglish set up a bicycle courier service run entirely by street children in Khartoum with "$200, a borrowed office, and an American Express card", creating Street Kids International.

=== Mexico and Guatemala ===
In 1986, Dalglish spent three months engaging street children in Guatemala and Mexico developing an anti-drug cartoon project, "Gold tooth", with Derek Lamb and Kaj Pindal, and two further films "Karate Kid" about HIV/AIDS and another about starting a business.

=== Canada ===
Dalglish served for some time as executive secretary to Youth Services Bureau of Ottawa, which helps out-of-work Canadian youth. In 1994, Dalglish was appointed as the first director of Youth Service Canada, the Government of Canada's civilian volunteer youth corps.

In 1997, Upper Canada College hired Dalglish to run the "Horizon Program" for inner-city youth in Toronto. "Horizon" was also the name of his project taking affluent Canadian youth to volunteer overseas.

=== Thailand ===
Dalglish then worked in Bangkok, helping as Father Joe Maier of the Human Development Center set up a legal-aid clinic for 8000 children in the legal system.

=== Nepal ===
In 2002 Dalglish was selected as the chief technical adviser for the UN's child labour program in Nepal. In this role, he focused on three initiatives: return children from orphanages to their families; treat children affected by HIV/AIDS, and apprenticeship training.

=== Afghanistan ===
Dalglish served as Senior Advisor and Deputy Chief of Party for UN-Habitat in Kabul, Afghanistan October 2010–December 2014. In December 2014, he became Chief of Party until the end of his mission in July 2015.

Dalglish also held senior positions for the United Nations' World Health Organization and International Labour Organization.

=== International ===
Dalglish started a for-profit corporation named "Schools Without Borders", along with Jacques de Milliano and Peter McFarlane, while residing in the Netherlands with his wife and child.

Between 2006 and 2010, Dalglish served as the executive director of the South Asia Children's Fund, which promotes education for disadvantaged children in the region. Following his Afghanistan mission, Dalglish joined the UN Mission for Ebola Emergency Response.

== Recognition ==
In December 2016, Dalglish was named a Member of the Order of Canada. Dalglish was stripped of that honour by the Governor General on May 16, 2026.

== Child sex assault conviction ==
Following his 2017 appointment to the board of directors for the United World College Thailand, the school held an inquiry following "speculation" Dalglish had inappropriate contact with local children - noting it did not involve their college-age students. After the high-profile news stories, a staff member at Shree Mangal Dvip Boarding School in Kathmandu claimed to have confronted him fifteen years earlier about his willingness to let students stay over at his home alleging she feared drunkenness could lead to impropriety.

In January 2018, a "local organisation" gave a tip to the Nepalese police alleging Dalglish was a paedophile. When Dalglish returned to Nepal in March, police attended to his three-storey house in Nagarkot where Dalglish's housekeeper alleged that his 14-year-old son and 12 year old nephew had showered with Dalglish, that he had touched their genitals, and had intercourse with him during some of their many stays at Dalglish's home while he continued working there. Police noted that among the many photos found in his house, some depicted unclothed children - which Dalglish defended as "children from places he has been travelling around the world, especially African children...the photographs are of the sort a tourist might take of unclothed children in impoverished areas", noting none showed inappropriate activity. On April 8, 2018, Dalglish was charged with child rape. On June 10, 2019, he was found guilty.

Nepalese police reported that Dalglish had given a confession, claiming he had sex with the boys as "revenge" because a teacher had molested him in Canada at the age of 11 - though Dalglish maintains the confession was false and coerced.

On July 8, 2019, he was sentenced to prison, though news reports vary on the length of his term.

Daglish appealed the conviction, but lost his appeal in January 2020, when the Patan High Court, while reducing the jail sentence from 9 to 8 years, upheld the conviction.

Daglish was removed from the Order of Canada in May 2026.
