= Tony Scott's unrealised projects =

During his long career, English film director Tony Scott worked on several projects which never progressed beyond the pre-production stage under his direction. Some of these productions fell into development hell or were cancelled.

== 1970s ==
=== White Dog ===
Scott was among the number of film directors attached to direct the film adaptation of White Dog in the 1970s, before Samuel Fuller's official involvement.

=== My Dog's on Fire ===
In the late 1970s, Scott read a spec script by David Webb Peoples called My Dog's on Fire, a comedy about a punk rock band. Scott wanted to direct it and hired Peoples to perform a rewrite. "Tony was a wonderful guy to work with," he later said. Though the film was never made, Scott recommended Peoples to work on Blade Runner (1982).

=== Alive ===
In 1979, it was announced that Scott would direct an adaptation of Alive: The Story of the Andes Survivors, with Edgar J. Scherick Associates producing. Steven Zaillian was hired to write the script, but rising costs kept Paramount Pictures from moving forward with the film. The project was eventually revived in 1993, directed by Frank Marshall.

== 1980s ==
=== Starman ===
Scott was among the number of film directors attached to direct Starman (1984) before John Carpenter's official involvement.

=== The Presidio ===
In 1987, Scott was selected to direct The Presidio and developed the film with writer Larry Ferguson, before departing from the production the following year. Peter Hyams was hired in his place. Scott described the story as "a drug war that becomes a war of obsession between a marine and a police officer set against a background of drugs, a crime and an obsessive love story."

== 1990s ==
=== Reservoir Dogs ===
According to Quentin Tarantino, Scott had initially asked to direct his script Reservoir Dogs (1992), but had to settle for True Romance (1993) instead after a buyout from producer William Lustig's company.

=== Judge Dredd ===
In the early 1990s, Scott was attached to direct an adaptation of the 2000 AD comics series Judge Dredd that was to star Arnold Schwarzenegger and be produced by Edward R. Pressman. Peter Briggs was one of several screenwriters enlisted by Pressman. Briggs' draft had to do with Dredd going up against arch enemy Judge Death, while Jonathan Gems pitched a film where Mega-City One is a post apocalyptic city filled with mutants and an unspecified draft from William Wisher Jr. According to Briggs, the producers were interested in having the film be based on The Return of Rico, in which Dredd's brother Rico escapes from prison and seeks out revenge. Briggs would eventually leave the project, as would Schwarzenegger and Scott later on. Judge Dredd was released in 1995, directed by Danny Cannon and starring Sylvester Stallone.

=== Tom Mix and Pancho Villa ===
Scott's involvement with Tom Mix and Pancho Villa goes as far back as June 1993, when The New York Times reported he was to direct the project for TriStar Pictures. In 2002, it was reported that Javier Bardem was to portray Pancho Villa in Scott's film. The project was to have been based on Clifford Irving's novel, and in 2003, it was reported that Scott was scouting locations in Mexico and Steven Zaillian was writing the screenplay. "This is Lawrence of Arabia (1962) meets The Wild Bunch (1969), a huge film with trains, cavalry, thousands of soldiers in uniform and on horseback," Scott said.

=== Money Train ===
Scott was initially signed to direct the heist film Money Train (1995) and had developed the script with writer Doug Richardson, even going as far as to go "undercover" with a Subway Crime Suppression Unit for research. He wanted to shoot the film entirely in the New York subway system, but the head of the Transit Authority told them that he must have a final script and casting approved for them to gain authorisation. Scott ultimately chose not to stay with the film, and, instead, Joseph Ruben was brought on to direct. According to Richardson, Ruben had him "replaced by a DMV line of writers who slowly dismantled the movie [he'd] so carefully constructed."

=== Tonight, He Comes ===
Vy Vincent Ngo's spec script for Hancock (2008), originally titled Tonight, He Comes, was written in 1996. The draft, about the relationship between a troubled 12-year-old and a fallen superhero, was first picked up by Scott with an interest in directing. However, the project languished in development hell and would be passed to several other directors before seeing release in 2008 under Peter Berg.

=== Gemini Man ===
In 1997, Scott became attached to direct Darren Lemke's script of Gemini Man for Walt Disney Pictures. Complications soon arose when the studio was planning how to make the film. Harrison Ford and Chris O'Donnell were considered for the lead roles. The producers toyed with the idea of an actor playing both roles through visual effects, but Scott moved on before any progress could be made. The resulting 2019 film starred Will Smith in a dual role and was directed by Ang Lee.

=== Untitled Navy pilot film ===
In June 1998, it was reported that Scott Free Productions had struck a deal to develop a film about an unnamed real-life United States Navy pilot who became a highly paid repo man who went after custom-made jet planes. Donald E. Stewart was hired to write the script. Scott and his brother Ridley were vying for the director's position on the project, after acquiring the life rights to the story the previous year. "It might be a helluva fight to see who gets to direct this one," Scott joked at the time.

=== Josiah's Canon ===
In November 1998, Scott was in negotiations to direct Fox 2000's action-thriller Josiah's Canon for producer Adam Fields. The spec script, first written by Jeff King, follows a Holocaust survivor who leads a team of bank robbers on a heist of a Swiss bank. During Scott's involvement, Phil Alden Robinson wrote a new screenplay draft.

=== The Tailor of Panama ===
Scott was the original director signed on for John le Carré's The Tailor of Panama for Columbia Pictures, which he was attached to film in 1998. The adaptation was eventually completed by John Boorman and released in 2002.

=== Kill Shot ===
Also in 1998, the feature adaptation of Elmore Leonard's thriller novel Killshot was being developed by Miramax Films and producer Lawrence Bender for Scott to direct and for Robert De Niro and Quentin Tarantino to star, possibly.

=== Untitled Newman/Haas Racing drama series ===
In January 1999, it was reported that Scott Free Productions was developing a new syndicated drama series centered around the CART racing circuit team owned by Paul Newman and Carl Haas, with Scott directing the pilot episode.

=== Take Down ===
In June 1999, it was reported that Scott was developing a film project titled Take Down with Jerry Bruckheimer producing it and Henry Bean serving as screenwriter.

=== Lucky Strike ===
Scott's involvement with Lucky Strike goes as far back as October 1999, when Variety reported it as a project in development with Bruckheimer. In February 2012, it was reported that Scott was to direct the film and that Vince Vaughn was cast as the lead. The film, budgeted to have been $80 million, was to have been produced by Emmett/Furla Films and distributed by 20th Century Fox. Henry Bean wrote the screenplay.

== 2000s ==
=== Spider-Man ===
Scott was in the running to direct Spider-Man (2002), the first film adaptation based on the Marvel Comics character of the same name, alongside Tim Burton, M. Night Shyamalan, Chris Columbus and Roland Emmerich before Sam Raimi was hired.

=== Untitled Cuba project ===
In November 2000, it was reported that Scott was to direct Caspian Tredwell-Owen's pitch of an untitled project set in post-Castro Cuba. According to Variety, the film was to have been "a high-stakes thriller in which organizations converge to exploit the new democracy."

=== Potsdamer Platz ===
It was announced in December 2000 that Scott would direct and produce a film project titled Potsdamer Platz, based on Buddy Giovinazzo's 2004 novel of the same title, which at the time was a manuscript. Javier Bardem, Jason Statham and Mickey Rourke were all reportedly attached to star in the film. Christopher Walken was also attached to appear in the film. Scott also reportedly attempted to cast Gene Hackman in the project. Al Pacino was also approached for a role in the project.

It was later announced in November 2010 that the project would no longer be titled Potsdamer Platz.

=== Taking Lives ===
In April 2001, it was reported that Jennifer Lopez would star in the action film Taking Lives (2004), with Scott directing for Warner Bros. The film was ultimately directed by D. J. Caruso, with Angelina Jolie starring, despite Scott being involved in the project for years beforehand.

=== Grand Theft Auto ===
According to Kirk Ewing, a friend of Sam and Dan Houser who worked with Rockstar Games on State of Emergency, the Houser brothers were offered $5 million to make a film based on their Grand Theft Auto video games in late 2001 around the release of Grand Theft Auto III, with Scott meant to direct and rapper Eminem meant to star. However, Sam told a Los Angeles producer who requested the film rights to make the film with Scott and Eminem that he wasn't interested.

=== American Caesar ===
In July 2002, Scott announced that he intended to follow up directing Man on Fire (2004) with a film called American Caesar at Universal, from a script by William Nicholson.

=== The Warriors remake ===
In September 2002, it was announced that Scott was to direct a remake of the 1979 film The Warriors for Paramount Pictures and MTV Films. In late 2006, Scott announced that his version would be set in Los Angeles. "The original Warriors were New York in the 1970s, and everything went upwards and vertically. And now I'm making it contemporary and doing it in L.A., so everything is horizontal. So my vision of The Warriors is Los Angeles in 2007 and the gangs, instead of being 30, are going to be 3,000 or 5,000," he said. Scott met with actual gang members for research: "I've met all the heads of all the different gangs, so I've already educated myself. They all said, 'Listen dude, if you get this on we'll sign a treaty and we'll all stand on the Long Beach Bridge. There'll be 150,000 members there. It'll look like the L.A. Marathon.' "

=== Emma's War ===
In June 2003, it was reported that Scott was attached to direct a film adaptation of Deborah Scroggins's book Emma's War: An Aid Worker, a Warlord, Radical Islam, and the Politics of Oil — A True Story of Love and Death in Sudan for 20th Century Fox, with Nicole Kidman to have starred as Emma McCune. In April 2005, McCune's brother, Johnny, told Kidman to abandon the project due to inaccuracies in Scroggins's novel. Scott said in October 2006, "It's been a difficult piece to crack. We had one writer aboard who did a pass at the script and didn't get it, but we've got someone else onboard now who I'm going to make live down there and smell it, touch it, feel it. There's nothing that can compare to that kind of first-hand experience."

=== Quantum of Solace ===
In 2007, Scott was briefly rumoured to be in the running to direct Quantum of Solace.

=== Donald Aronow biopic ===
In October 2007, it was announced that Scott was to direct a biopic on Donald Aronow for Fox 2000 Pictures, with the screenplay written by Michael A.M. Lerner.

=== Purefold ===
In June 2009, Scott announced that he would collaborate with his brother Ridley and his nephew Luke on Purefold, a Blade Runner-related project consisting of an episodic web series examining conceptions of empathy. His brother Ridley wouldn't materialise a Blade Runner follow-up until the release of Blade Runner 2049 in 2017.

=== The Hunger sequel ===
It was reported in June 2009 that Scott was to have done a sequel to his 1983 film The Hunger. In November 2011, Scott said the film was "not necessarily a remake or a reinvention" and that he was "in development with a writer from City of God" with plans to film it in Rio, Brazil. Scott described his vision as "City of God meets The Hunger. And it will be all about the nightlife where the feeding is easy and people go missing undetected."

=== Steve Banerjee biopic ===
In October 2009, it was announced that Scott was attached to direct a biopic about Chippendales co-founder and convicted arsonist, racketeer, and murderer Somen "Steve" Banerjee.

== 2010s ==
=== Hell's Angels ===
In May 2010, it was announced that Scott was to direct a film project titled Hell's Angels, with the screenplay written by Scott Frank, and Mickey Rourke was in talks to portray Sonny Barger. Shia LaBeouf was also attached to the project. It was later reported in August 2011 that Scott wanted Jeff Bridges to portray Barger.

In 2014, it was announced that Rob Weiss would take over the project and that Scott would be credited as a producer posthumously. Frank said of the project in 2014: "The version that we were going to do died with Tony."

=== The Associate ===
In August 2010, it was reported that Scott was in talks to direct a film adaptation of the John Grisham novel The Associate for Paramount. The Los Angeles Times reported that Shia LaBeouf would star in the project, with William Monahan and Lorenzo di Bonaventura serving as screenwriter and producer, respectively. In April 2012, it was announced that Adrian Lyne replaced Scott.

=== Nemesis ===
Also in August 2010, it was reported that Scott was to direct a film adaptation of Mark Millar and Steve McNiven's Nemesis for 20th Century Fox. Scott said he planned for the project to feature CGI heavily, "because it's conceptually different [...] I began my life as a painter and will continue to paint in a digital format for Nemesis." He also wanted to cast A-list and unknown actors, but did not disclose any names.

=== Man of Steel ===
In September 2010, it was announced that Scott was on the shortlist of film directors considered to direct Man of Steel.

=== Top Gun sequel ===
In October 2010, Scott confirmed that he would direct the sequel to his 1986 film Top Gun. Scott said, "It's not even a reinvention, it's not even a sequel. It's a re-thinking." Scott was set to direct the film at the time of his death in 2012. Two days before his death, Scott reportedly met with Tom Cruise to discuss how the sequel would play out.

An official sequel, Top Gun: Maverick, was released in 2022 and was dedicated to Scott's memory.

=== The Wild Bunch remake ===
In August 2011, it was announced that Scott was in talks to direct a remake of the 1969 Sam Peckinpah film The Wild Bunch for Warner Bros.

=== Narco Sub ===
In November 2011, it was announced that Scott was attached to direct a film for 20th Century Fox titled Narco Sub. Following Scott's death in 2012, others were slated to direct the film, including Antoine Fuqua, Doug Liman, Joe Carnahan and Brian Kirk.

=== 24 ===
In December 2011, it was announced that Scott was no longer attached to direct a feature film based on the television series 24.
