= Emma's War =

Emma's War may refer to:

- Emma's War (book), a 2002 book by Deborah Scroggins
- Emma's War (film), a 1986 Australian film
