= Impact Entrepreneurship Group =

- Founded: 2004
- Purpose: Entrepreneurship
- Location: Waterloo, Ontario, Canada
- Region served: Canada
- Volunteers: Approx. 150
- Website: impact.org

Impact Entrepreneurship Group is a Canadian non-profit youth-run organization. Founded in 2004, it aims to foster and develop entrepreneurship among university and high school students. It has offices in Vancouver, Calgary and Waterloo, Ontario.

To fulfill its aim, Impact has a number of different programs and initiatives to promote youth entrepreneurship and leadership, both at the local and national level. The organization currently consists of over 100 student volunteers across Canada.

== Origins ==
Impact was founded in 2004 by Kunal Gupta, who was a first-year software engineering student at the University of Waterloo. Gupta, along with his classmate Gaurav Jain and three others, envisioned a non-profit, student-run organization promoting entrepreneurship among Canadian youth in order to advocate entrepreneurship among high school, university, and college students.

== Current Initiatives ==
Impact organizes many local events and programs, mainly in Southern Ontario. Its national initiatives include the following:

=== EntrepreneurHub ===
A new initiative launched in 2011, EntrepreneurHub.ca is a website built to connect startups to students and recent graduates who are looking for employment opportunities in startups. The website is also used by entrepreneurs to connect with each other to form partnerships.

=== I Am My Ambition ===
I Am My Ambition is a series of short videos released by Impact, in which entrepreneurs, philanthropists, and politicians share their experiences, successes and failures. The aim of this project is to showcase these people in a way that youth can easily relate to, and in a way that would inspire youth.

=== Impact Apprentice ===
Based on the successful reality show The Apprentice, Impact Apprentice is an annual nationwide business competition between student teams from universities across Canada.

Although over 1000 individuals apply to Impact Apprentice each year, only about 32 students are chosen to participate in the competition. Factors taken into account during the application process include business knowledge, leadership talents, and their entrepreneurial experience.

In the Impact Apprentice competition, the teams are placed under high-pressure situations, where they are required to make key decisions in their business. Thus, the competition aims to test not only the students’ academic knowledge, but also their ability to face realistic business challenges. For example, the students will be asked to manage real profits and budgets and face challenges in sales, consulting, management, and advertising. However, unlike the reality show that it was based on, no candidates will be "fired" if they fail a task, but instead, points are awarded based on the teams’ success. In the end, the winning team shares $10 000 in grand prizes.

Past competitions were professionally filmed and were uploaded onto the Internet, where the episodes reached over 4000 views in less than three months.

=== Impact Gala ===
Starting in 2011, Impact Gala will be an annual event that brings together entrepreneurs, industry leaders, top students, and Impact members and partners to celebrate the entrepreneurial community. Impact Gala will feature networking opportunities, keynote addresses, and an awards ceremony.

=== Impact Microcredit ===
Impact Microcredit is a national competition in which teams of students from high schools across Canada are given $100 to launch a business idea and make as much money as possible within a week. Proceeds from the competition are donated to charities chosen by the winners. The teams are judged based on their creativity of their business plans, the effectiveness of their execution, as well as their profits. The winning teams are awarded scholarships, admission to the Encounters With Canada program, cash prizes, as well as various scholarships and grants.

== Past Presidents ==
- Kunal Gupta
- Albert Lam
- Ray Cao
- Sarah Katyal
- Alex Shipillo
- Vino Jeyapalan
- Daniel Rodic
- Jaxson Khan

== Past Initiatives ==
=== Impact Connect ===
Impact Connect organized entrepreneurship competitions, networking events, and seminars throughout the year, with the aim of exposing interested students into the realm of entrepreneurship. Most of its events took place around the Waterloo area. Past events organized by Impact Connect include the HackU Competition and the Impact Start-OP day, both held at the University of Waterloo.

=== Impact Expo ===
Impact Expo was a one-day conference held at the University of Waterloo, where students were invited to take part in discussions centered on career planning, soft skills development, and corporate cultures. In addition, business leaders also spoke to students with their insights in entrepreneurship, networking, and leadership. Past speakers at the Impact Expo include Major-General Lewis MacKenzie, and Gerry Remers of Christie Digital.

=== Think Impact ===
Think Impact was a monthly newsletter sent to members of the Impact Entrepreneurship Group. Interviews included well known and successful entrepreneurs such as Harry Rosen, Brian Scudamore, Murat Al-Katib, Frank O'Dea and others. The editor and main writer of the newsletter was Arda Ocal.

=== Impact National Conference ===
The Impact National Conference was a two-day conference held annually in Toronto during the month of November. At the conference, students from high schools, universities, and colleges across Canada participated in activities that allowed them to learn from and network with their peers and successful entrepreneurs. Topics discussed included 21st century business skills, innovation, and the role of entrepreneurship in shaping Canada’s economic future.

Past speakers at the Impact National Conference include:

- Justin Trudeau—Canadian politician
- Craig Kielburger—Founder of Free the Children
- Michael Lee-Chin—Executive Chairman of AIC Limited
- Andy Nulman—Co-founder of Just for Laughs

The Impact National Conference also featured workshops aimed to reveal the process, obstacles, and rewards of taking an idea to business. In these workshops, the conference delegates engaged in an interactive discussion with experienced entrepreneurs.

Another part of the Impact National Conference was its exhibition showcase, in which the delegates had the opportunity to meet and network with representatives of different companies across Canada. Companies that have attended the conference in past years include Telus, RIM, IBM, Deloitte, and Michelin.

=== Impact Innovate ===
Impact Innovate was a one-day conference held in Kingston held in March 2010. During the conference, the topics of innovative thought and the entrepreneurial spirit were discussed. Like the Impact National Conference, Impact Innovate featured interactive workshops, networking sessions, as well as discussions with local professionals and entrepreneurs.

== See also ==
- Entrepreneurship education
