= Durisol House =

- U.S. National Register of Historic Places
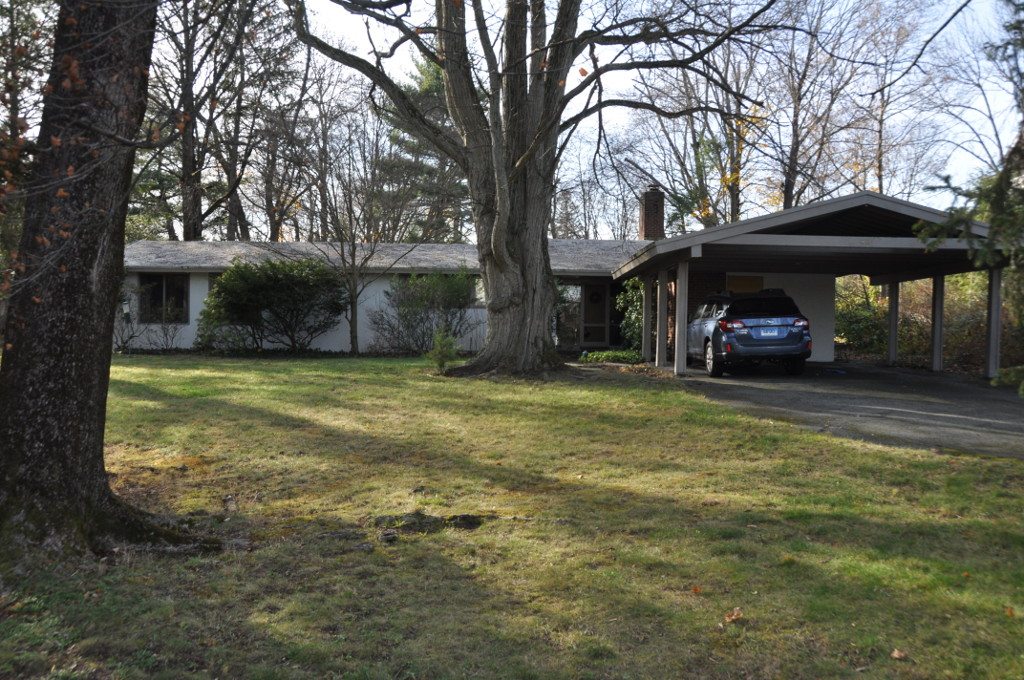

- Location within Connecticut Location within the United States
- Location: 43 Marshall Ridge Road, New Canaan, Connecticut
- Coordinates: 41°9′21″N 73°30′25″W
- Area: 0.6 acres (0.24 ha)
- Built: 1949
- Architect: Sherwood, Mills & Smith; Robert DuPont
- Architectural style: Modern Movement
- MPS: Mid-Twentieth-Century Modern REsidences in Connecticut 1930-1979, MPS
- NRHP reference No.: 10000566
- Added to NRHP: September 16, 2010

The Durisol House, also known as the Jens Risom House, is a historic house at 43 Marshall Ridge Road in New Canaan, Connecticut. Built in 1949, this Mid-Century Modern house was built to showcase cement-bonded wood fiber, a newly developed material marketed under the brand name Durisol. The house was bought soon after its construction by designer Jens Risom, and is also known as the Jens Risom House. It was listed on the National Register of Historic Places in 2010.

== Description and history ==
The Durisol House is located in a residential area, southwest of the village center of New Canaan, on the west side of Marshall Ridge Road near its junction with Sunrise Avenue. It is a single-story structure, with a steel frame and low-pitch side-gable roof. Its exterior walls are built out of blocks of the eponymous Durisol, essentially an aggregate mixture of wood fibers and Portland cement, and finished in stucco. The roof is sheathed in panels of the same material, covered with tar and gravel. The house has two rectangular components under its roof: the original house to the left, and a former garage which is separated from the main block by a former porch. Both the porch and garage have been integrated into the living space, and a gable-roofed carport now extends in front of the former garage. The interior retains many original features and finishes, include Durisol ceiling tiles.

The house was built in 1949 to a design by Sherwood, Mills & Smith for Robert Jahn as a speculative venture. It was the third demonstration house to be built using Durisol, and the first to employ the material in block form for its exterior walls. The first two houses were built in New York the previous year. The house was purchased in 1950 by Danish furniture designer Jens Risom for use by his family. The house appeared in several design magazines in the 1950s which featured his work. His family remained in the house until 1959, when they moved to larger house elsewhere in New Canaan.

== See also ==
- National Register of Historic Places listings in Fairfield County, Connecticut
