= Fibrenap (Cushy Pads) =

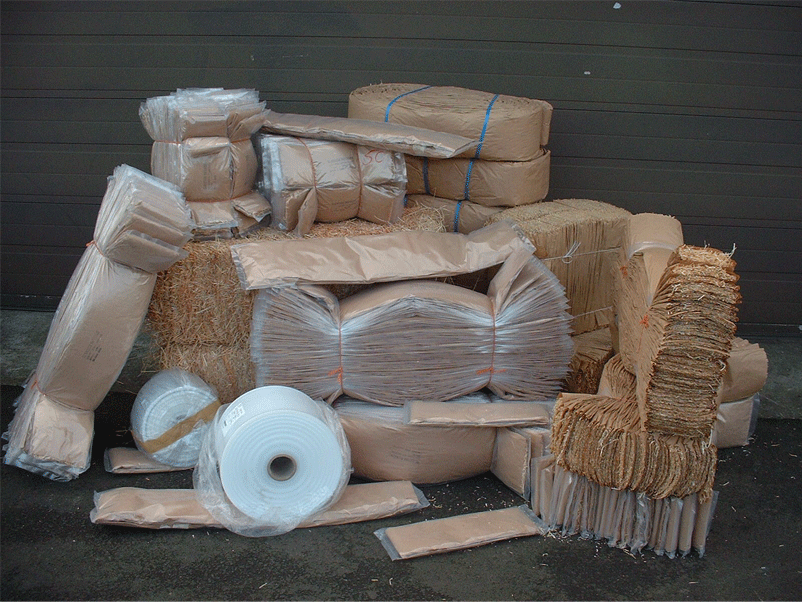
Various representations of Fibrenap

Fibrenap, also referred to as Cushy Pad, is a product made from wood wool bound in Kraft paper which can be used as an environmentally friendly method for packaging a wide range of items. Fibrenap, in its simplest form, comes as a roll of Kraft paper stuffed with wood wool and comes in a variety of widths. These rolls of Fibrenap can be cut to any length desired, wrapped in a plastic sleeve or made into bails. Any combination of these methods can be used to ensure it is in a form which is best suited to the item it is packaging. Fibrenap is most commonly used to transport heavy industry items to protect the items against vibrations and shocks which could occur during transportation.
