= Entrepreneurship education =

Type of financial education

Entrepreneurship education sets to provide students with the knowledge, skills and motivation to encourage entrepreneurial success in a variety of settings.

Variations of entrepreneurship education are offered at all levels of schooling from primary or secondary schools through graduate university programs.

== Objectives ==
Entrepreneurship education focuses on the development of skills or attributes that enable the realization of opportunity, where management education is focused on the best way to operate existing hierarchies. Both approaches share an interest in achieving "profit" in some form (which in non-profit organizations or government can take the form of increased services or decreased cost or increased responsiveness to the customer/citizen/client).

Entrepreneurship education can be oriented towards different ways of realizing opportunities:

- The most popular one is regular entrepreneurship: opening a new organization (e.g. starting a new business). The vast majority of programs on university level teach entrepreneurship in a similar way to other business degrees. However, the UK Higher Education system makes distinction between the creativity and innovation aspects, which it sees as a precursor to new venture development. Here Enterprise is defined as an ability to develop multiple ideas and opportunities that can be made real, and entrepreneurship is defined as the development of business acumen that can realize the full potential. This enables any discipline that is subject to the UK Higher Education's Quality Assurance Agency for Higher Education's guidance, to offer subject-based entrepreneurial curriculum. The European Commission set out a series of learning outcomes that address the need for European-wide perspectives on how such learning should be evaluated, and highlight the need for teacher development at all levels. Best practice guidance for schools and teachers is also available via the Directorate-General for Enterprise and Industry's Entrepreneurship 2020 Unit. Moreover, in 2015 the OECD partnered the European Commission to produce guidance for the development of skills and competencies for entrepreneurship. An alternative approach is action-based entrepreneurship education programs. This is sometimes also labelled as venture creation programs (VCP). In these programs the students launch a new business as an integral part of the learning process. The most comprehensive VCP programs therefore also run a business incubator on site and operate over a long time period (e.g. 1–2 years).
- Another approach is to promote innovation or introduce new products, services, or markets in existing firms. This approach is called corporate entrepreneurship or Intrapreneurship, and was made popular by author Gifford Pinchot in his book of the same name. Newer research indicates that clustering is now a driving factor. Clustering occurs when a group of employees breaks off from the parent company to found a new company but continues to do business with the parent. Silicon Valley is one such cluster, grown very large.
- A recent approach involves creating charitable organizations (or portions of existing charities) which are designed to be self-supporting in addition to doing their good works. This is usually called social entrepreneurship or social venturing. Even a version of public sector entrepreneurship has come into being in governments, with an increased focus on innovation and customer service. This approach got its start in the policies of the United Kingdom's Margaret Thatcher and the United States' Ronald Reagan.
- Entrepreneurship is also being developed as a way of developing skills such as risk-taking and problem solving that facilitate achievement of life goals and in education.
- Whether startup entrepreneurs or growing business owners, the challenge is much bigger than what we normally assume. It's critically important for us to know what we are getting into. Right education around the core pillars of entrepreneurship and professional business development - Mindset, Skills, Knowledge and Tools is important. Taking the bull by the horns approach has helped millions of entrepreneurs, and it is the best strategy to not only prepare from mental preparedness to tackle the challenges but also from planning the resources to overcome.

Entrepreneurship For Kids:

To catch them early is the vision. Based on certain research in India & Israel, Schools are now incorporating new courses for young students. Founder of Leader To Creator Entrepreneurship for kids Pradeep Mishra started this program in schools in India. The kids are taught about business and economics at a very young age. Students are exposed to a controlled economic environment for better learning outcomes.

Multidisciplinary

Since multidisciplinary is important to entrepreneurship, it is important to teach entrepreneurship in a multidisciplinary environment in order to create help students to work with peers from different fields of study and educational level.

== See also ==
- Business
- Business analytics
- Entrepreneur
- Impact Entrepreneurship Group
- List of entrepreneurs
