= Second Cup =

Canadian coffee shop chain

Second Cup Coffee Co.
- Trade name: Second Cup Café
- Type: Subsidiary
- Industry: Coffee shop
- Founded: 1975; 51 years ago
- Headquarters: Mississauga, Ontario, Canada
- Products: Coffee beverages; tea; other beverages; baked goods; sandwiches
- Parent: Foodtastic Inc.
- Website: secondcup.com

Second Cup is a Canadian coffeehouse chain and retailer of specialty coffee headquartered in Mississauga, Ontario. Its stores sell hot and cold beverages, pastries, snacks, pre-packaged food items, sandwiches, and drinkware, including mugs and tumblers.

== History ==
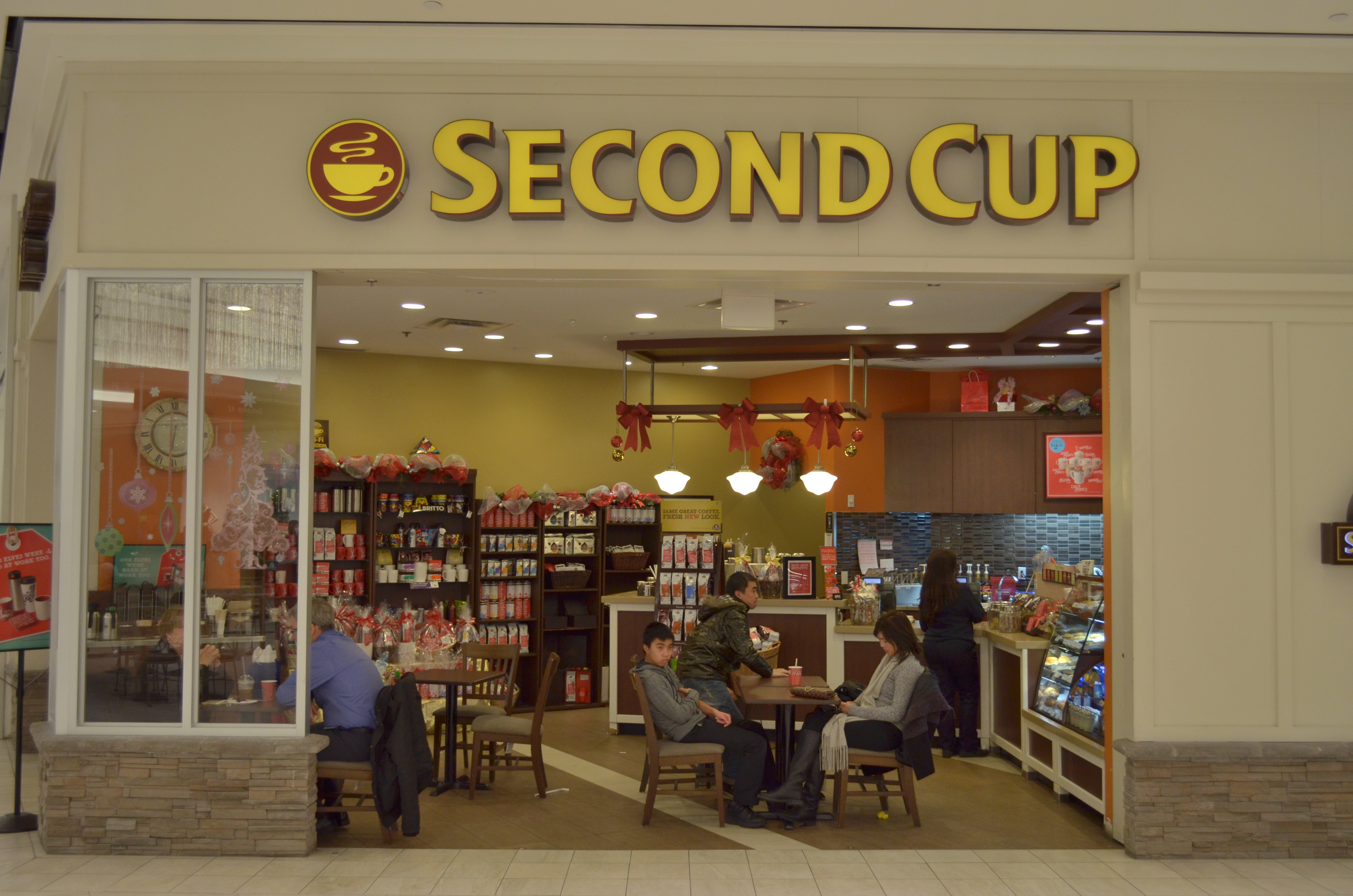
Second Cup at Markville Mall in Markham, Ontario

Second Cup was founded in 1975 by Tom Culligan and Frank O'Dea in Toronto, Ontario. Culligan eventually purchased O'Dea's shares and expanded Second Cup into a 150-store chain. He sold it in 1988 to the founder of mmmuffins, Michael Bregman.

As chairman and CEO, Khalil Al Gawad took Second Cup public in 1993. Between 1993 and 2002, it was owned by several American companies, including Coffee Plantation, Coffee People, and Caribou Coffee. Al Gawad sold Second Cup to Cara Operations Limited in 2002.

In November 2006, Cara sold Second Cup to Dinecorp Hospitality, controlled by former Cara CEO Gabe Tsampalieros, who became chairman of Second Cup. Tsampalieros died on March 11, 2009.

The trademark rights were subsequently split between Canada (the Second Cup Ltd.) and international (the Second Cup Coffee Company Inc.). Stacey Mowbray was head of the Canadian company, and Jim Ragas led the international side. Second Cup was featured in an episode of Undercover Boss that aired in March 2012 on the W Network. Under Mowbray's direction, Second Cup was presented as "a company that cares".

In September 2012, the company launched Tassimo beverages. In April 2015, Second Cup started a rewards program, which allows users to earn points using a mobile app. Alix Box was the CEO and president at Second Cup Ltd. from 2014 until her sudden departure, in May 2017; she was temporarily replaced by Garry MacDonald.

On April 12, 2018, Bregman announced an agreement with National Access Cannabis to develop and convert a network of recreational cannabis stores. Second Cup agreed to transform some of its western Canada locations into recreational cannabis dispensaries, with no cannabis-related products to be sold at its cafés. The company stated that this alliance would allow it to leverage its real estate assets to drive value for the franchisees without affecting plans for new product innovation and opening new cafés across Canada. In August 2018, the company was already considering which of its locations in Ontario might be suitable as cannabis retail stores as an alternative to their current use, in conjunction with National Access Cannabis.

On November 8, 2019, Second Cup announced plans to change its name to Aegis Brands Inc. (TSX: AEG), pending stockholder approval the following year. The company was scheduled to open two cannabis stores in Calgary in early 2020 and planned expansion into Ontario. On December 5, 2019, Aegis Brands announced its acquisition of Ottawa-based coffeehouse chain Bridgehead Coffee for $11 million.

In February 2021, Aegis Brands agreed to sell Second Cup to Quebec-based Foodtastic Inc. for an undisclosed sale price that included $14 million in cash. Foodtastic chief executive Peter Mammas said that the company intended to expand the brand to 300 locations by 2025, from the existing store count of 190.

In May 2025, Second Cup's international division filed for creditor protection under the Companies' Creditors Arrangement Act in Canada. This comes after the company was unable to pay nearly $10 million to its creditors.

== Rainforest Alliance ==
The Rainforest Alliance is an international nonprofit organization that works to conserve biodiversity and promote the fair treatment of workers. Rainforest Alliance Certified coffee farms must meet standards that include the protection of farms, soils, waterways, and wildlife; the workers are in safe working conditions; and the workers enjoy suitable housing, medical care, and access to schools for their children. 80% of Second Cup coffees are Rainforest Alliance Certified.

As of the end of 2011, Second Cup offered ten whole-leaf tea blends and herbal tisanes that were fair trade certified.

== Firebombing incident ==
In 2001, Rhéal Mathieu, a member of Front de libération du Québec (FLQ), who in 1967 had been sentenced to nine years in prison for terrorist activities including murder, was convicted of firebombing three Second Cup locations in Montreal. The responsibility for the bombings was claimed by the Brigade d'autodéfense du français (BAF) (translated as Self Defence Brigade of French). BAF claimed it had targeted the stores because the company used its incorporated English name, "Second Cup", demanding the inclusion of French in the name. After the media coverage of the fire bombings, many Second Cup locations in Quebec changed their signs to Les cafés Second Cup.

== See also ==
- List of coffeehouse chains
