= Wood wool =

Product made of wood slivers cut from logs

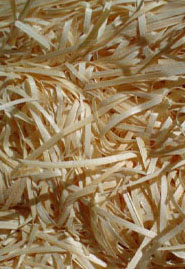
Excelsior, or wood wool

Wood wool, known primarily as excelsior in North America, is a product made of wood slivers cut from logs. It is mainly used in packaging, for cooling pads in home evaporative cooling systems known as swamp coolers, for erosion control mats, and as a raw material for the production of other products such as bonded wood wool boards. In the past it was used as stuffing, or padding, in upholstery, or to fill stuffed toys. It is also sometimes used by taxidermists to construct the armatures of taxidermy mounts.

Today, wood wool is used as a material in a wide variety of applications. The problem is that wood wool is not recorded as a separate product in statistical surveys, and thus its production cannot be reflected in the relevant trade statistics, either in terms of volume or value. However, wood wool is by no means a “byproduct,” as this classification assumes due to a lack of knowledge.

Until 2004, wood wool was covered by DIN Standard 4077. After World War II, wood wool producers found themselves in a cutthroat competition with plastic manufacturers and their alternatives, particularly in one of their most important markets—mattresses and packaging. As a result, more and more wood wool producers ceased operations; industry associations were even dissolved, and the DIN standard was ultimately repealed in 2004.

Today, for example, Switzerland has the Swiss Wood Wool Standard for quality assurance.

== History ==
A different product was once known as "wood wool", as well as "pine needle-wool", or "pine wood-wool". According to E. Littell, it was produced in Breslau, Silesia (today Wrocław, Poland) by von Pannewich, who mentioned that in 1842 five hundred counterpanes made of it were purchased for a hospital in Vienna. The process was chemical and made use of the leaves (needles) of Scots Pine.

In Britain, yet another product known as wood wool was produced by the chemical breakdown of wood strips by means of sulphurous acid, for use in such applications as absorbent material in surgical dressings. Another application of this product was use in sanitary towels, as shown in advertisements from 1885 to 1892 in Britain for "wood wool diapers" or "sanitary wood wool sheets". European "wood wool" was known in America in the late nineteenth century as being distinctly different from excelsior.

Fifteen US patents related to "slivering machines" for producing the small wood shreds "known as excelsior" were listed by 1876. The earliest, a machine for "Manufacturing wood to be used as a substitute for curled hair in stuffing beds" was patented in the US in 1842; however, the product had no specific name when the process was first patented.

The 1868 patent, "Improved capillary material for filling gas and air carburettors", was for a new use for "fibres torn from the wood by suitable machinery" to be "sold and used as filling for mattresses, its commercial name being 'excelsior'." This is the earliest description of the material by this name cited by the Oxford English Dictionary, though the term "excelsior mattress" had appeared in print as early as 1856.

In 1906, the now-common use of wood wool in the cooling pads of evaporative coolers appeared in a patent that stated, "I have found that excelsior makes a very cheap and good material for this purpose."

In the beginning of the 20th century wood wool was used as a raw material for producing wood wool panels in Europe, especially in Austria. By 1930, wood wool cement boards were being widely produced.

In the 21st century, wood wool appears in numerous patents for erosion control and sediment control methods and devices; for example, the 2006 "Sediment control device and system". A few late-twentieth-century patents on these uses refer to "excelsior/wood wool".

== Terminology ==
In the United States the term wood wool is reserved for finer grades. The US Forest Service stated in 1948 and 1961 that, "In this country the product has no other general name, but in most other countries all grades of excelsior are known as wood wool. In the United States the name wood wool is reserved for only a small proportion of the output consisting of certain special grades of extra thin and narrow stock."

The US Standard Industrial Classification Index SIC is 2429 for the product "Wood wool (excelsior)". The same term is used by the United States for the external trade number under which wood wool is monitored: HTS Number: 4405.00.00 Description: Wood wool (excelsior); wood flour.

The number 4405.00 is applied to wood wool by the World Customs Organization in the Harmonized Commodity Description and Coding System (HS).

== Grades and classifications ==
The 1973 US Federal Government procurement specification PPP-E-911, cancelled in 1991, categorized "wood excelsior" products according to the following table of terms and dimensions:

Table I. Strand size for type I class A and B
Grade	Nomenclature	Thickness of strand		Width of strand	
Grade	Nomenclature	(in)	(mm)	(in)	(mm)
1	Superfine wood wool	0.006	0.152	0.020	0.508
2	Wood wool	0.012	0.305	0.020	0.508
3	Extra fine	0.015	0.381	0.031	0.787
4	Fine	0.018	0.457	0.031	0.787
5	Medium	0.021	0.533	0.041	1.041
6	Coarse or ribbon	0.015	0.381	0.167	4.242

== Properties ==
Wood wool fibers can be compressed and when the pressure is removed they resume their initial volume. This is a useful property for minimizing their volume when shipping. Due to its high volume and large surface area, wood wool can be used for applications where water or moisture retention is necessary. The width of wood wool fibers varies from 1.5 to 20 mm (0.059 to 0.79 in), while their length is usually around 500 mm 500 mm (20 in) (depending on the production process).

In the UK there are specifications for dimensions, pH, moisture content and freedom from dust and small pieces, set by British Standard BS 2548 for wood wool for general packaging purposes. This standard was originally issued in 1954 and subsequently re-issued in 1986.

When these fibers are bonded with cement or magnesite, bonded wood wool boards are produced. Slabs of bonded wood wool are considered environmentally friendly construction and insulation materials because they do not contain organic binders.

== Production ==
Wood wool is cut from "bolts" (round, halved, quartered, or otherwise split logs) of poplar (for example aspen), pine, spruce or eucalyptus. For evaporative cooler pads, the dominant source is the aspen.

Wood wool can be produced in either horizontal or vertical shredding machines.

A possible further processing option is washing, which removes dust. Wood-wool processing may involve drying to reduce moisture in compliance with local requirements, as in the UK.

== Applications ==
Wood wool has many applications; examples include:

- Restoration of antique buggy seats, and furniture.
- A packaging material for cushioning, such as Fibrenap (Cushy Pads). In the early 20th century, wood wool was packed around paleontological specimens to minimize damage during shipment.
- A stuffing for plush toys or for real animals in taxidermy. It was traditionally used in stuffing Teddy bears and still is for the muzzles of some collectible bears.
- Cooling pads in home evaporative cooler systems known as "swamp coolers".
- Bedding for animals and their cages. Wood wool serves to cushion the animals while providing some warmth and absorbing waste. For example, it is found in dairies, in hutches and in cardboard boxes when shipping day-old poultry within the United States.
- When dyed green, the material can be used as an artificial grass in Easter egg baskets. This was popular before the prevalence of plastics.
- Mats and blankets for erosion control.
- A material used in the production of cement-bonded wood wool boards.
- When banded into a bale form, it is used as an archery backstop, comparable to how a straw bale would be used for the same purpose. If protected from the elements, a wood wool archery backstop can last for many years. If sections of it wear down because of repeated targeting, the bale can be soaked liberally since it then expands and holds water, just like a dry sponge.
- Garden mulches and as a growing medium for hydroponic gardens.
