= Emma McCune =

British foreign aid worker in Sudan

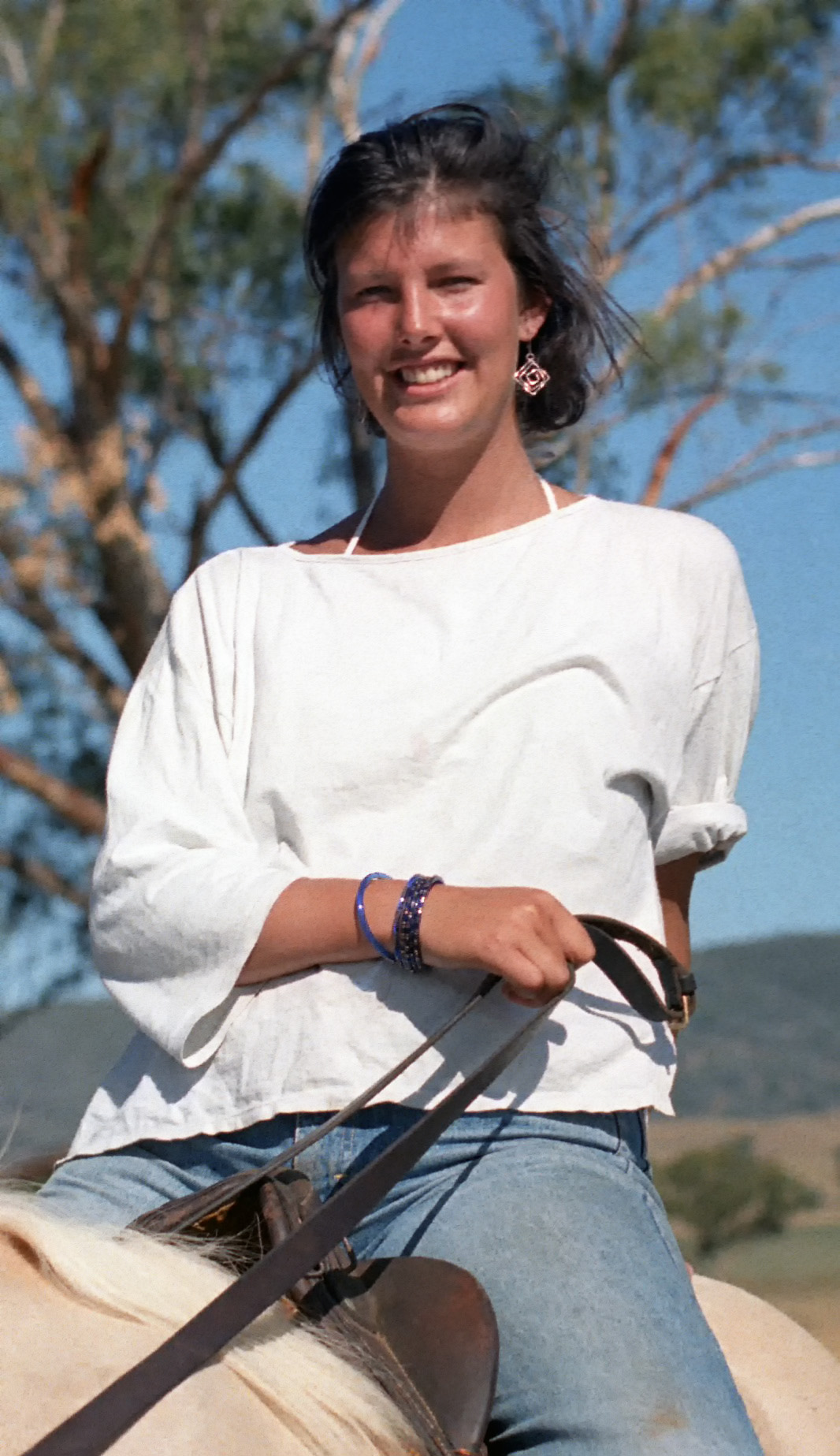
- McCune in 1985
- Born: 3 February 1964; Assam, India
- Died: 24 November 1993 (aged 29); Nairobi, Kenya
- Occupation: Foreign aid worker
- Spouse: Riek Machar (m. 1991)

Emma McCune (3 February 1964 – 24 November 1993) was a British foreign aid worker in Sudan who married then-guerrilla leader Riek Machar. She was killed when hit by a matatu in Kenya whilst expecting her first child.

== Biography ==
Emma McCune was born in Assam, India, in 1964 to British expatriates Julian and Maggie McCune. She was the oldest of four children. The family moved to Yorkshire, England, when Emma was 2 years old in 1966.

She attended Convent of the Assumption in Richmond, England. She studied art and art history from 1984 to 1986 at Oxford Polytechnic. There she became interested in Africa. Emma later attended SOAS University of London.

In 1985 Emma flew to Australia and back in a single-engined light aircraft with her friend Bill Hall.

=== Sudan ===
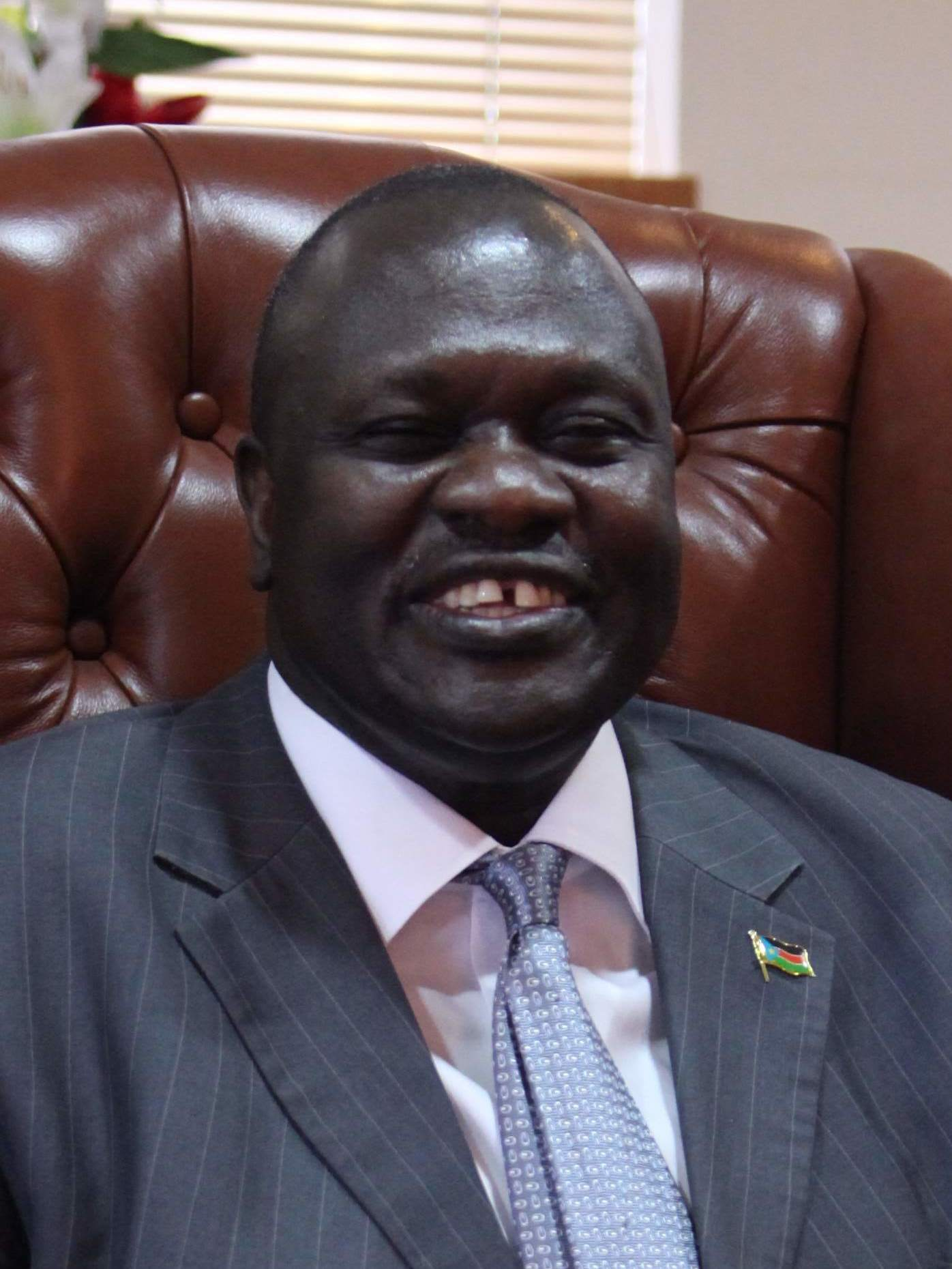
Emma's husband Riek Machar, a former Vice President of South Sudan

McCune went to war-torn Sudan in 1987 at age 23 to teach for the British organization Volunteer Services Overseas. After reluctantly returning to England in 1988 McCune once again returned to Sudan in 1989 to work for the UNICEF-funded Canadian organisation Street Kids International, which founded or re-opened more than 100 village schools in the country's south. McCune spent much of the late 1980s in the south in the midst of war and famine.

=== Riek Machar ===
McCune met Riek Machar, a senior commander in the Sudan People’s Liberation Army, in 1989 through her role as an aid worker in Sudan. They were instantly attracted to one another despite Machar already having a Sudanese wife, Angela, who was living in England with the couple’s three children at the time.

In June 1991, McCune wed Machar in Nasir, Sudan. The wedding happened amid quarreling between Machar, SPLA chairman John Garang and other SPLA leaders. Garang accused Emma of being a British spy and of using her influence over her husband to orchestrate a coup against him. McCune dismissed Garang’s accusations as ridiculous in an interview with The Sunday Times journalist Richard Ellis. To preserve its neutrality, Street Kids International informed McCune they could not continue working with her given the marriage.

After taking up with Machar, including using a UN-supplied typewriter to produce manifestos, she was fired by Street Kids International. She lived with Machar as war intensified and he split his faction away from the larger movement. At one point they fled a machine-gun attack. In 1993, after becoming pregnant, she moved to Nairobi; she and her unborn child died in a car crash in Nairobi, Kenya.

== Publications ==
Emma's mother, Maggie McCune, published her story in Till the Sun Grows Cold.

Journalist Deborah Scroggins wrote an unauthorised biography of her, Emma's War. "In my heart, I'm Sudanese," she once said, according to Scroggins. Scroggins' depiction of the young British aid worker is complicated and often critical. McCune is depicted as a woman willing to bravely confront military warlords to allow Sudanese children to be schooled in their villages but later, after marrying that same warlord, is able to deny to herself the corruption and horrific violence resulting from her husband's civil war struggle.

The book had been optioned for a film to be directed by Tony Scott, but the family objected to a film based on the book, delaying its production. The film was still in development at the time of Scott's death in 2012; its fate remains unclear.

== Legacy ==
Emma assisted more than 150 war children in Sudan including hip hop artist Emmanuel Jal and is the title subject of his song "Emma McCune" on his 2008 album Warchild.
