= Frank O'Dea =

Canadian businessman

Francis O’Dea, OC (born 1945 in Montreal) is a Canadian entrepreneur, humanitarian and author. He left a lifestyle of homeless panhandling and in 1975 co-founded the Second Cup chain of coffee stores with Tom Culligan.

He is the chair of the Bauen Group of Companies and of CUSO International Cuso International.

He was involved with the founding of Proshred Holdings Ltd, an international document destruction service (1986), and Samaritan Air Service, a regional air ambulance service (1989).

O'Dea became founding president of Renascent Treatment Foundation, (1983), founded Street Kids International (1988), and the Canadian Landmine Foundation (1999)., he initiated the international charity, Night of a Thousand Dinners (2000), with Colin Powell, Sir Paul McCartney, and Kofi Annan, which resulted in 11,000 people sitting down to fundraising dinners in 29 countries all on the same night.

O'Dea has been CEO of Arxx Corporation, the once largest manufacturer and installer of Insulated Concrete Forms in North America. Arxx Corporation in 2008 acquired American PolySteel Llc. and Ecoblock Inc., this acquisition included technology and IP rights of both companies as well as all assets and distribution networks for an undisclosed amount. American PolySteel founded in 1978 as Foam Form the oldest ICF manufacturer in North America traces its roots back to Werner Gregori, the Canadian who was issued the first patent US 3.552.076 for insulating concrete forms dating back to 1966, which American PolySteel owned the rights to. Arxx rebranded the Ecoblock and PolySteel product lines and continued expanding until 2014 when its North American assets and IP rights were acquired by Airlight Plastics Co. and its Latin/South American assets and IP rights, including patent US 2004/045237 sold to AF Global Inc. the parent corporation of the Brazilian companies Bauen Capital S.A. and Arxx Building Products S.A.. Mr. O'Dea served as chairman of the board and chief executive officer of Arxx Corporation (alternate name, Arxx Building Products Inc.) positions he held since Arxx's beginning. He served as chairman of the board of Bauen Capital S.A. ("Grupo Bauen") a Canadian/Brazilian asset management firm which acquired the Latin American asset and IP rights of Arxx Corporation technologies. Frank served as Chairman of Arxx Brasil S.A. the Brazilian corporation that produces and commercializes Arxx ICF (Insulated Concrete Forms).

O'Dea is also a co-founder of True North, a Toronto-based investing fund which was one of the top suppliers of personal protective equipment for the Canadian federal government during the COVID-19 pandemic in Canada.

== Books ==
- 2007: When All You Have is Hope (Penguin Canada) ISBN 978-0-670-06427-4
- 2013 Do The Next Right Thing: Surviving Life's Crises (Penguin Canada) ISBN 9780670065875
