= Bridgehead Coffee =

Fair trade coffeehouse chain based in Ontario, Canada

Coordinates: 45.39150°N 75.75465°W

Bridgehead

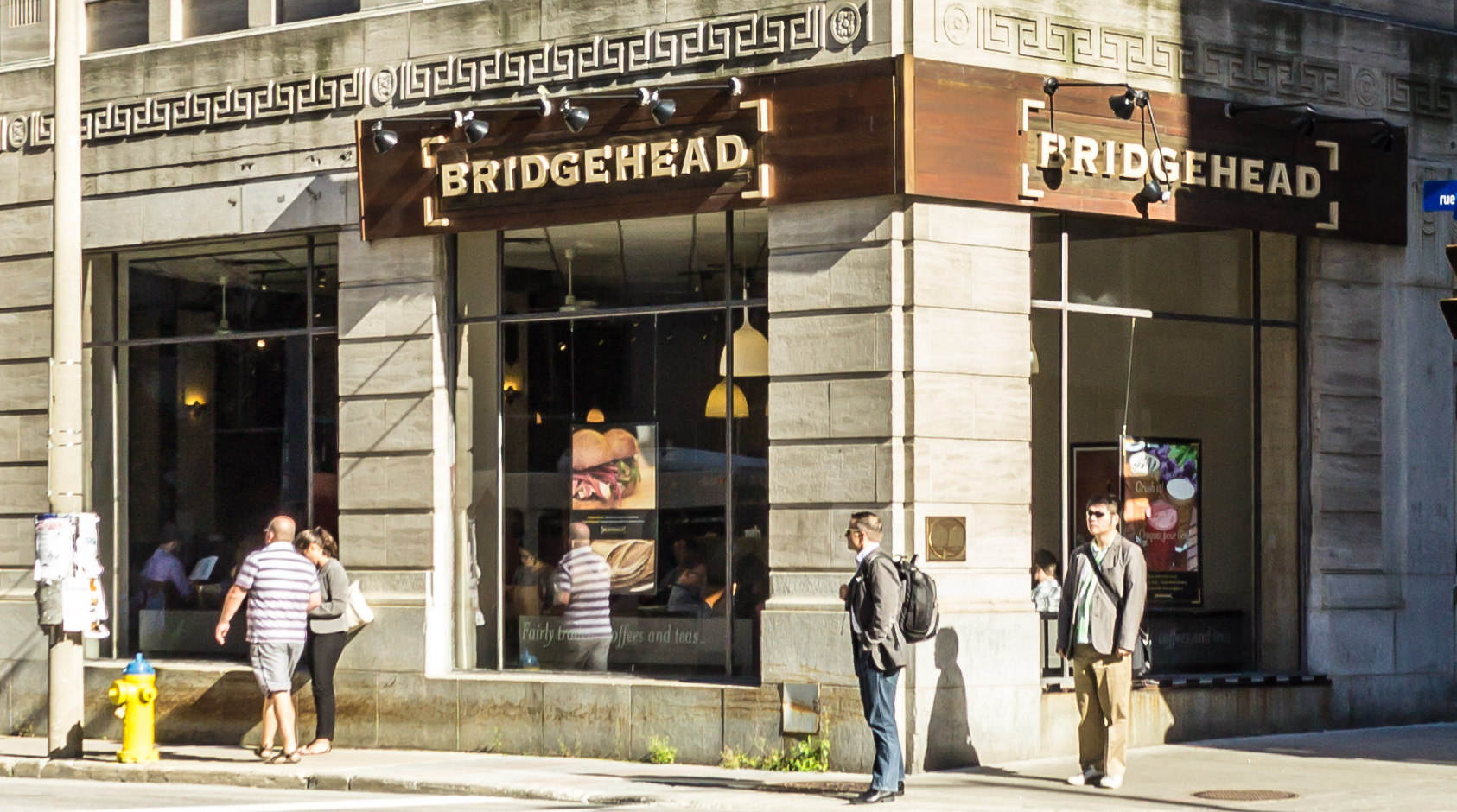
- Type: coffeehouse
- Industry: Coffee, Coffee Roaster, Coffee Beans
- Founded: 1981; 45 years ago
- Headquarters: 130 Anderson Street; Ottawa, Ontario; K1R 6T7
- Number of locations: 71
- Area served: Southern Ontario
- Products: coffee, tea, hot chocolate, juice, kombucha, bread, granola, baked goods
- Website: www.bridgehead.ca

Bridgehead is a fair trade coffeehouse, coffee retailer, and coffee roaster chain based in Ottawa, Ontario, Canada. In addition to coffee and organic teas, it sells soups, salads, sandwiches and snacks made in its own kitchen. In November 2006, Bridgehead was voted Ottawa's "Best Coffee/Tea House" by readers of lifestyle weekly Ottawa XPress.

== History ==
Bridgehead was formed in Toronto, Ontario, originally as Bridgehead Trading, in 1981, by two United Church ministers and two social activists who were concerned with small-scale coffee farmers in Nicaragua.

Bridgehead was the first company to offer Canadian consumers fairly traded coffee, as a group of volunteers sold coffee from the basements of churches in Toronto. The business grew rapidly and was soon acquired by Oxfam Canada in 1984.

Under Oxfam Canada, Bridgehead became a formally incorporated, for-profit company. Oxfam Canada's aim was not to focus on the coffee that Bridgehead was funded and grew from, but to bring in a more diverse fair-trade product line. This eventually led to a decrease in profits and eventually a dip into losses. A profile of Bridgehead's post-Oxfam management in the Ottawa Citizen claimed that Oxfam Canada's Bridgehead ultimately failed in the mid-1990s due in part to a "lack of sound business practices."

In May 1998, Bridgehead was acquired by Shared Interest. This U.K. based lending society held the Bridgehead name in hopes of finding a buyer. Shared Interest only needed to hold the name for a year as in 1999; an offer arrived from Tracey Clark.

Clark wanted to restore Bridgehead to its former status as a fair-trade coffee and tea company. In April 2000, Bridgehead Inc. was formed, and on June 17, 2000, the first Bridgehead Coffeehouse opened at 362 Richmond Road in Westboro, Ottawa, Ontario. Clark originally relied on financing from family and friends, but by 2002, Bridgehead was owned by 30 investors. Also in 2002, Clark opened a central kitchen to serve Bridgehead's line of food products. Bridgehead expanded from one outlet in 2000 to nine by 2008, and currently operates twenty outlets, requiring the company to provide calorie counts for all of its food products.

June 2012 marked the opening of Bridgehead's own roastery, which is now where all of the coffee that is sold by the company is roasted. A further development is the introduction of alcohol to Bridgehead's beverage lineup. In July 2015, According to the reports, Bridgehead Coffee opened a 1,850-square-foot location in a six-storey office at the corner of Pinecrest road and Iris Street. As of September 2015, select Bridgehead locations began to offer beer from local breweries Beau's and Beyond the Pale, as well as wine and coffee-inspired cocktails. In 2017, Bridgehead began working with Carleton University's Mass Spectrometry Centre to uncover answers about how coffee beans age on a cellular level.

In December 2019, the company announced it was being sold to Aegis Brands, parent company of the Second Cup coffee chain. In January 2024, Aegis sold the Bridgehead brand to Pilot Coffee Roasters.

== See also ==
- List of coffeehouse chains
