= Sherwood, Mills & Smith =

American architecture firm

Sherwood, Mills & Smith SMS Partnership SMS Architects
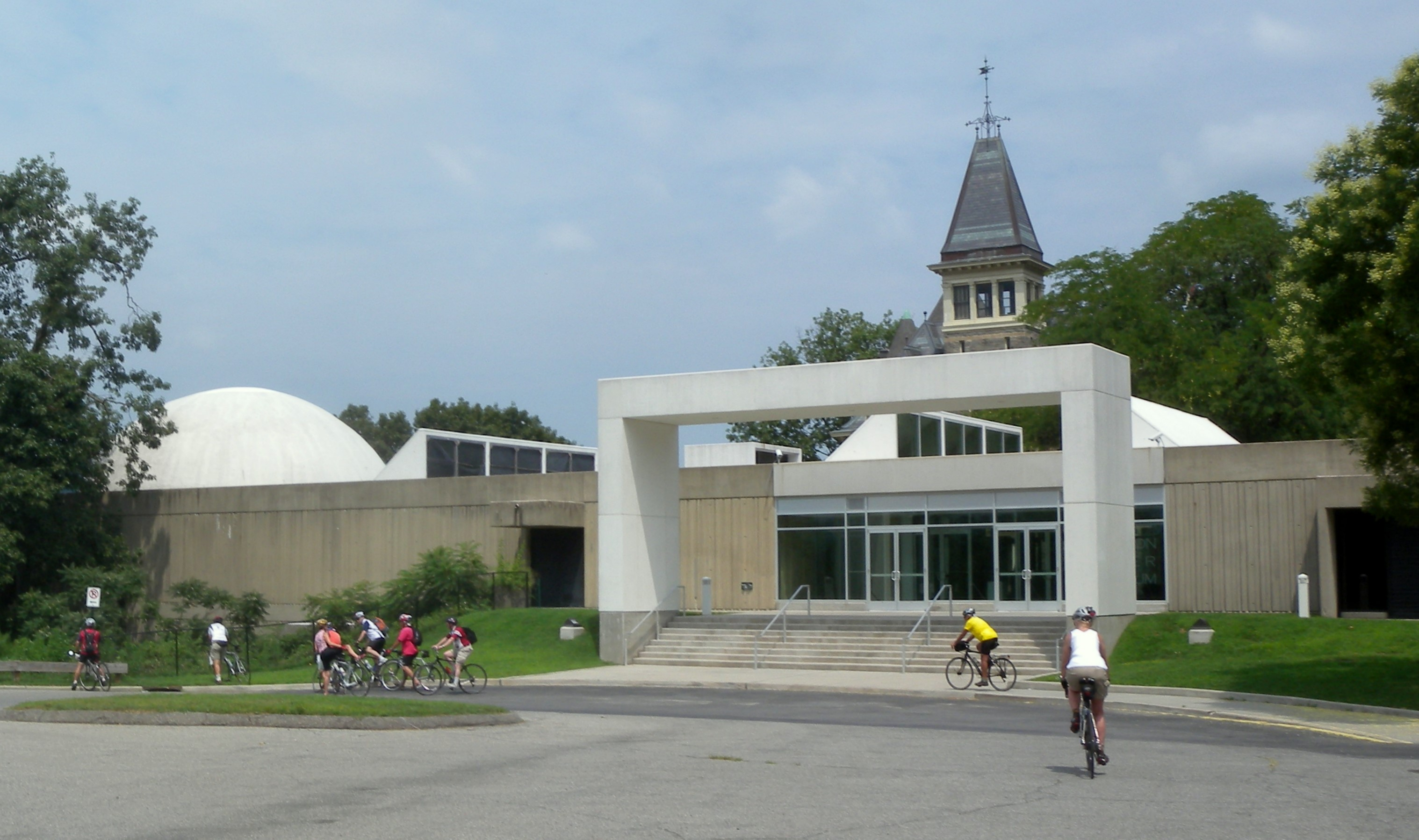
- The Hudson River Museum in Yonkers, New York, designed chiefly by Willis N. Mills and Willis N. Mills Jr. of Sherwood, Mills & Smith and completed in 1969.

Practice information
- Founders: Thorne Sherwood FAIA; Willis N. Mills FAIA; Lester W. Smith FAIA
- Founded: 1946
- Dissolved: 2000
- Location: Stamford, Connecticut

Thorne Sherwood
- Born: December 3, 1910; Montclair, New Jersey
- Died: December 27, 1994 (aged 84)
- Occupation: Architect

Willis N. Mills
- Born: January 5, 1907; Menominee, Michigan
- Died: September 25, 1995 (aged 88)
- Occupation: Architect

Lester W. Smith
- Born: May 21, 1909; Brooklyn
- Died: July 24, 1993 (aged 84)
- Occupation: Architect

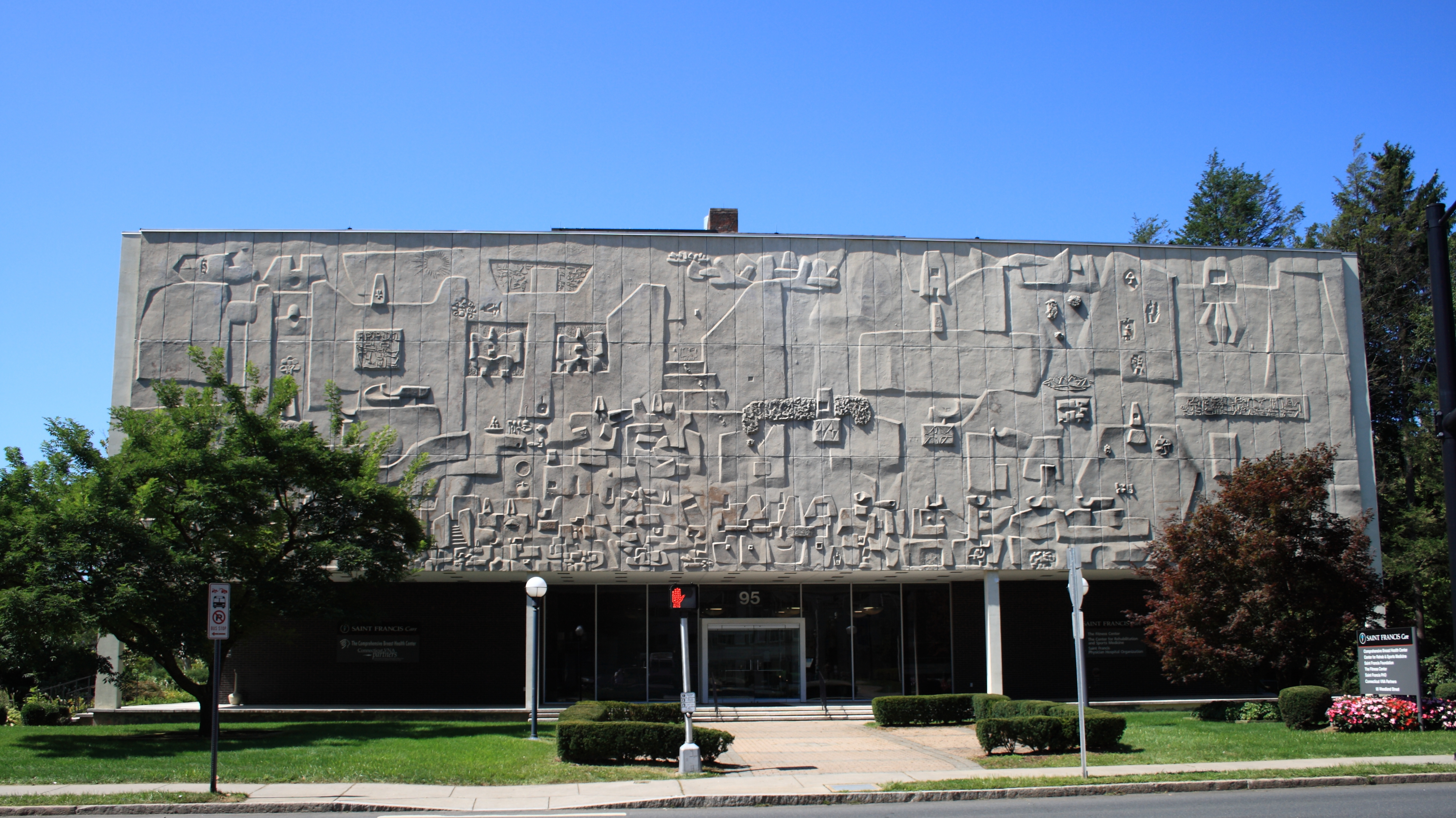
The former Mutual Insurance Company of Hartford offices, completed in 1959, featuring a cast concrete mural by Costantino Nivola.

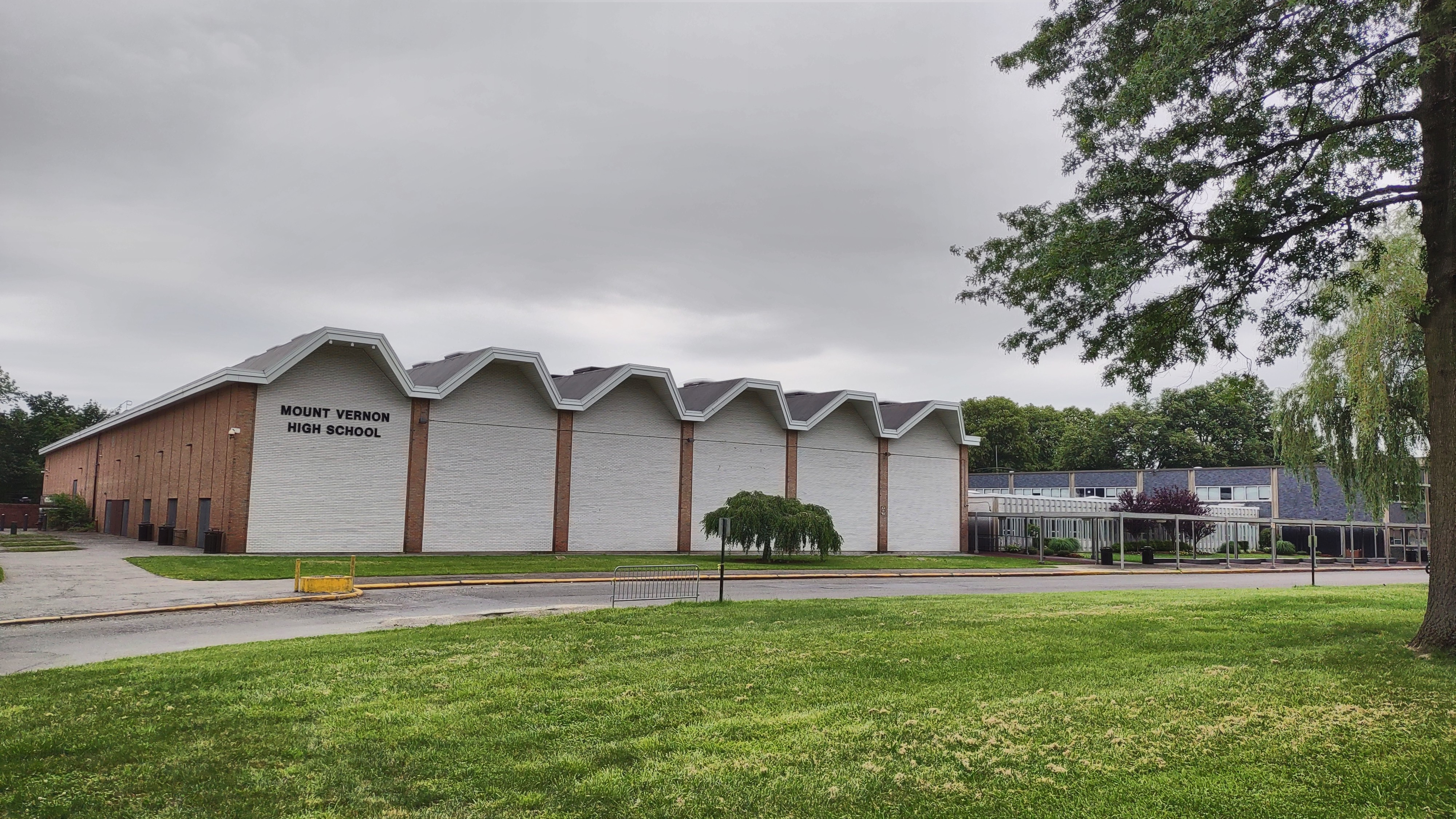
The Mount Vernon High School, designed by Sherwood, Mills & Smith and completed in 1961.

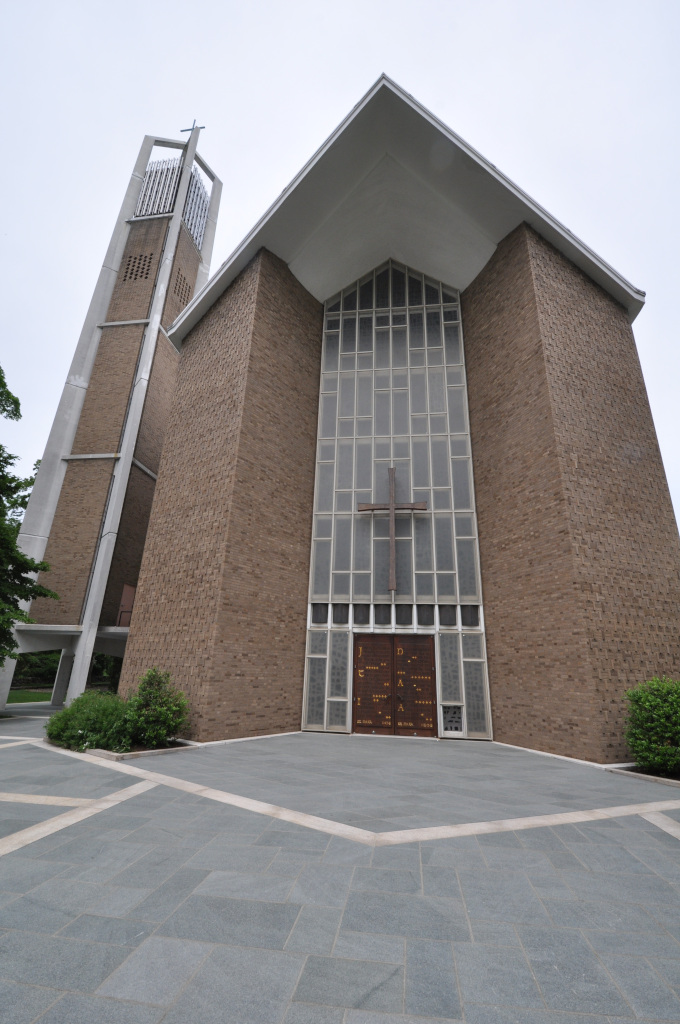
St. Mark's Episcopal Church in New Canaan, completed in 1961.

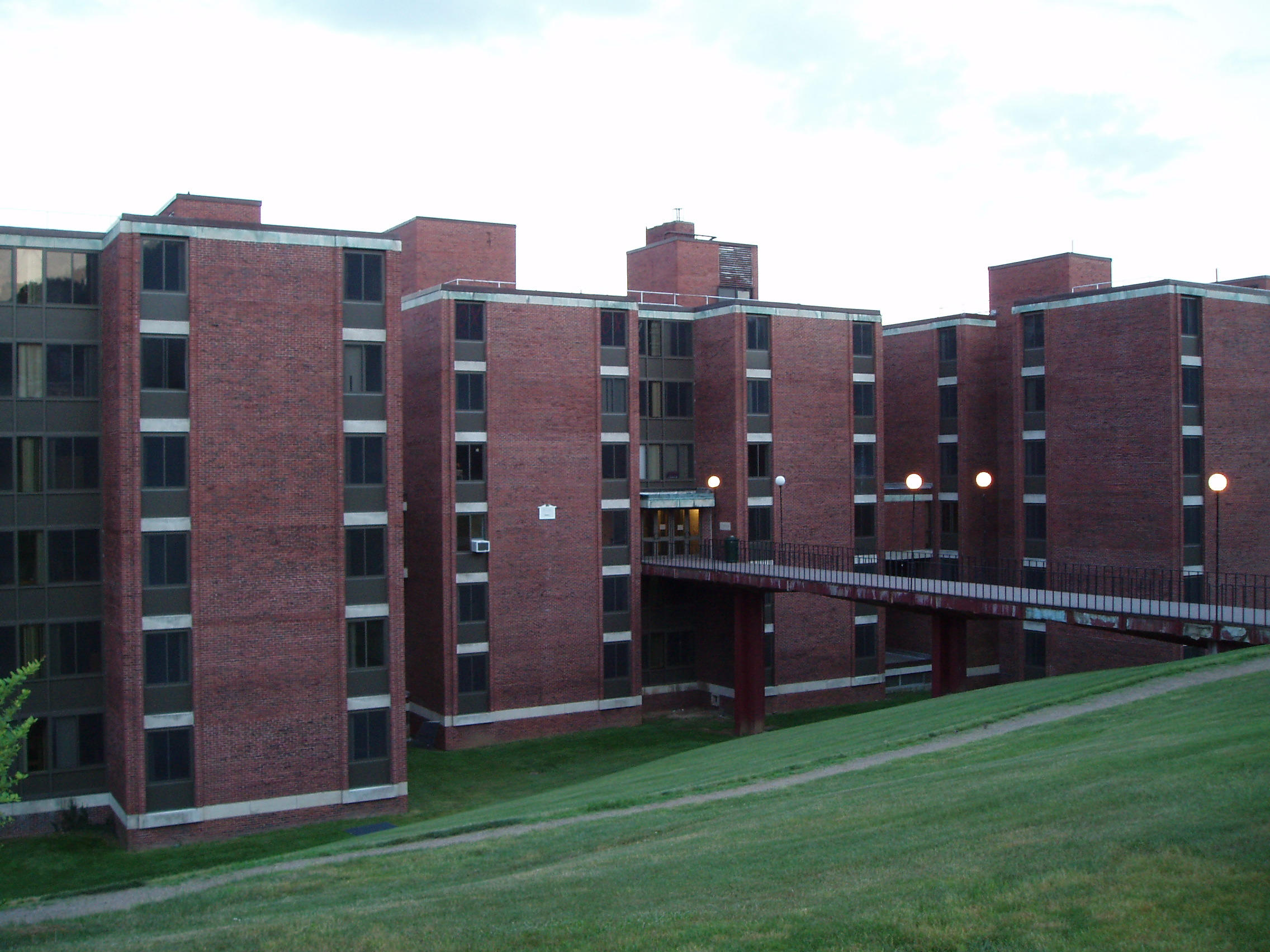
Towers Hall of Wagner College, completed in 1964.

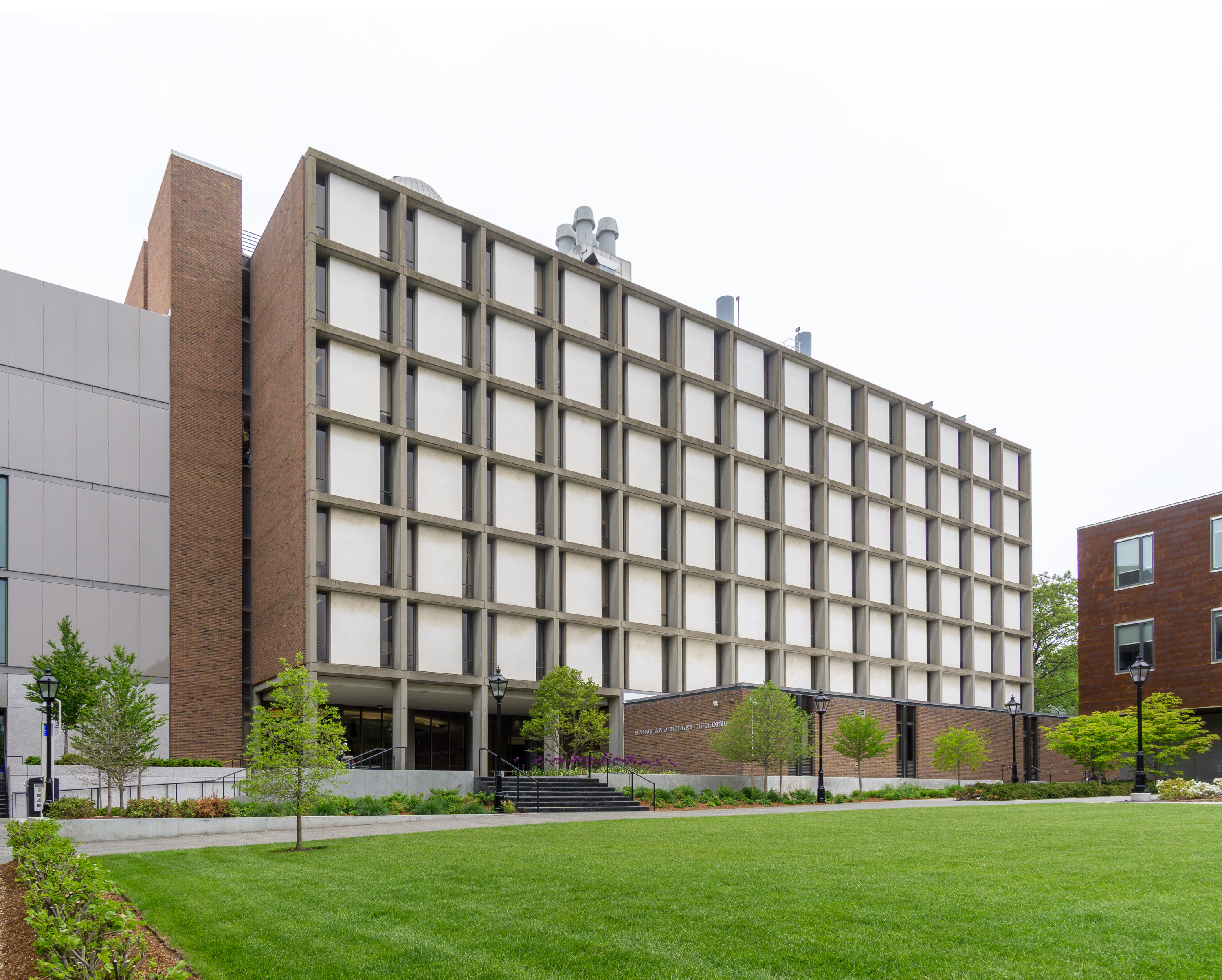
The Barus and Holley Building of Brown University, completed in 1965.

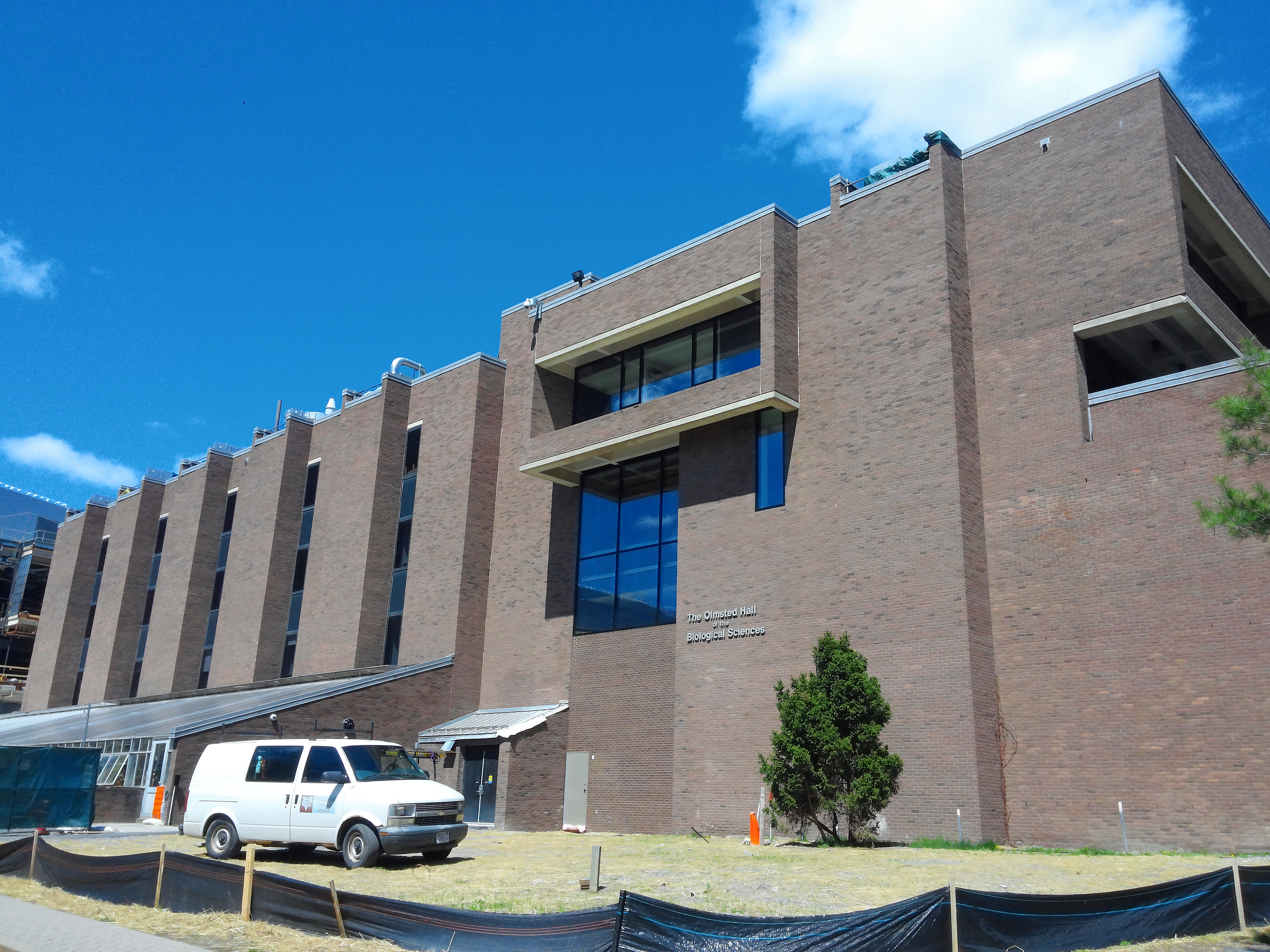
Olmsted Hall of Vassar College, completed in 1973.

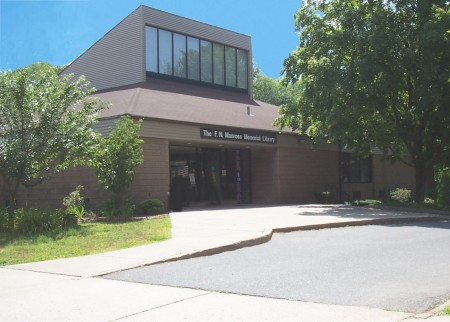
The F. N. Manross Memorial Library in Bristol, completed in 1975.

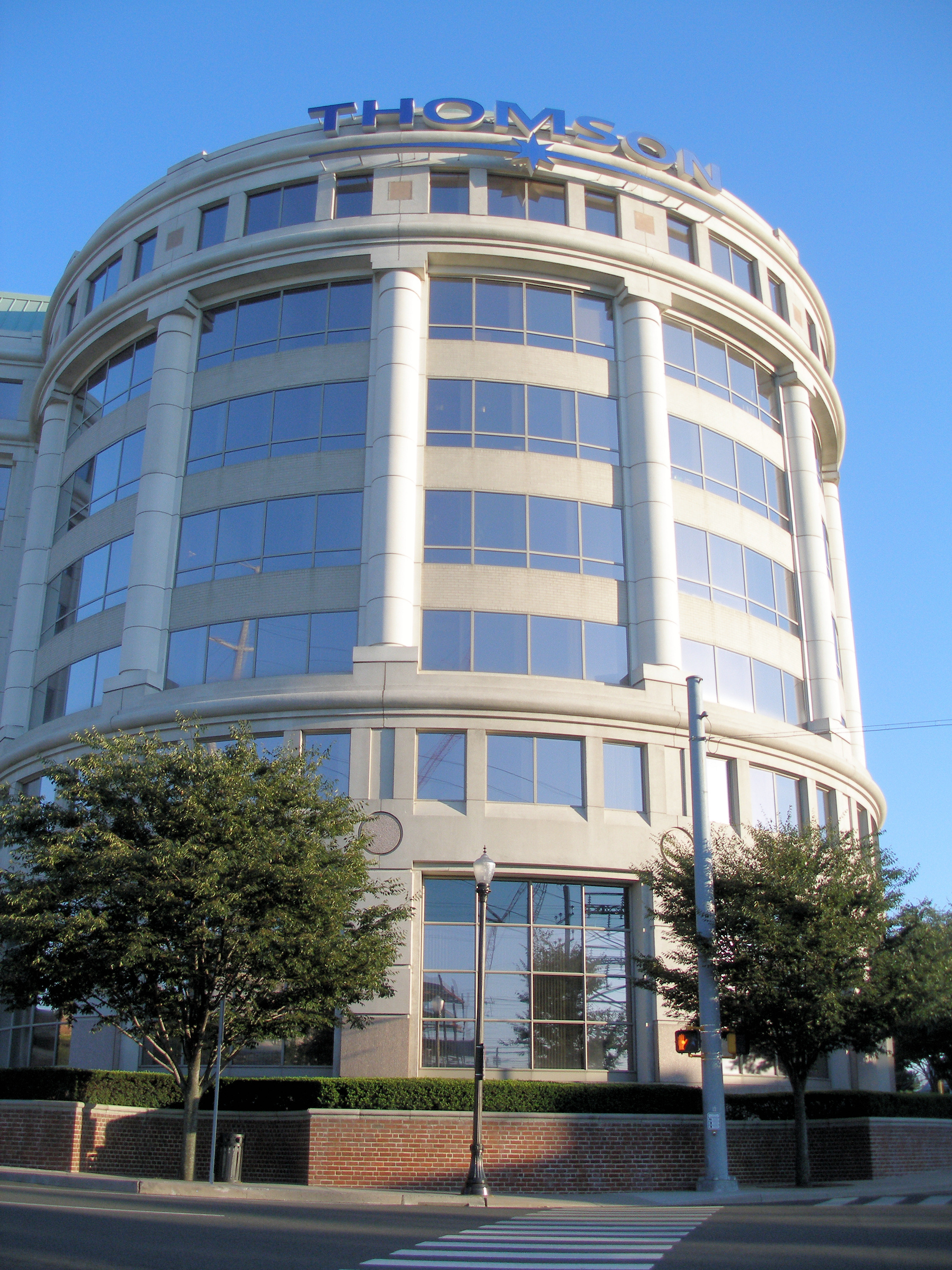
Metro Center in Stamford, completed in 1988.

Sherwood, Mills & Smith, known after 1968 as the SMS Partnership and as SMS Architects, was an American architecture firm active in Stamford and New Canaan, Connecticut from 1946 to 2000. Initially the partnership of architects Thorne Sherwood FAIA, Willis N. Mills FAIA and Lester W. Smith FAIA, the firm grew into one of the most influential in the region.

== History ==
Sherwood, Mills & Smith was founded in 1946 in Stamford as the partnership of three architects, Thorne Sherwood (1910–1994), Willis N. Mills (1907–1995) and Lester W. Smith (1909–1993).

Thorne Sherwood was born December 3, 1910, in Montclair, New Jersey. He was educated at Williams College and Columbia University, graduating from the latter in 1936 with a BArch. He worked for Schultze & Weaver, van der Gracht & Kilham, Harrison & Fouilhoux and Raymond Loewy before 1942. During World War II he served in the naval reserve and was discharged in 1946.

Willis Nathaniel Mills was born January 5, 1907, in Menominee, Michigan. His father, also Willis Nathaniel, was a lawyer who was a Michigan State Senator from 1905 to 1907. He was educated at the Kent School, the University of Pennsylvania and Columbia University, graduating from the latter in 1934. He worked for Shreve, Lamb & Harmon and William Lescaze before opening his own office in 1937. He served in the marine corps reserve during World War II and was discharged in 1946.

Lester Wickham Smith was born May 21, 1909, in Brooklyn. He was educated at Princeton University, earning an AB in 1930 and an MFA in 1933. He worked for van der Gracht & Kilham, Wallace K. Harrison and Voorhees, Walker, Foley & Smith before 1940. During World War II he served in the army air force and was discharged in 1946.

The partners chose to locate in Stamford, forty miles from New York City, because it offered many of the advantages and resources of the city without its drawbacks, including competition from other architects. This choice proved advantageous, and the firm expanded quickly over the next ten years.

In 1959, to manage this expansion, Sherwood, Mills & Smith added four new partners, Thomas A. Norton (1922–2016), Carrell S. McNulty Jr. (born 1924), Gray Taylor (1916–1985) and A. Raymond von Brock (1922–2006).

Thomas Akin Norton was born August 4, 1922, in Great Neck, New York. He served in the air force during World War II and was educated at Columbia University, earning a BA in 1946 and a BArch in 1949. He worked for O'Connor & Kilham and Skidmore, Owings & Merrill before joining Sherwood, Mills & Smith in 1953.

Carrell Stewart McNulty Jr. was born December 4, 1924, in Newark, New Jersey. He was educated at Emory University, the University of North Carolina and Columbia University, graduating from the latter in 1950 with a BArch. He joined Sherwood, Mills & Smith immediately after leaving school.

Gray Taylor was born April 15, 1916, in New York City. He attended Harvard College and Columbia University, graduating from the latter in 1947 with a BArch. His education was interrupted by World War II, and he served in the corps of engineers from 1941 to 1945. He worked for Ketchum, Giná & Sharp and William F. Schorn before joining Sherwood, Mills & Smith in 1954.

A. Raymond von Brock was born March 18, 1922, in Greenwich, Connecticut. He was educated at the Pratt Institute, graduating in 1946 with a BArch. He worked for Ryder, Struppmann & Neumann before joining Sherwood, Mills & Smith in 1952.

The firm's leadership was again changed in 1963 when Norton left to enter private practice, and in 1967 Mills' son, Willis N. Mills Jr. (1933–2020), joined as partner.

Willis Nathaniel Mills Jr. was born September 25, 1933, in New York City. He was educated at Princeton University, earning an AB in 1955 and an MFA in 1958. He worked for Pedersen & Tilney and Earl P. Carlin in New Haven before joining his father's firm in 1963. In 1962 he was also the architect of a house in Van Hornesville, New York for James H. Case, a relative of his wife, and his then wife, Laura Rockefeller Chasin. This house, completed in 1963, is now NRHP-listed.

In 1968 the firm was renamed the SMS Partnership. The economic decline of the late 1960s led the firm to downsize. Thorne Sherwood retired in 1969, and in 1970 the firm was incorporated as SMS Architects. Mills and Smith retired in 1970 and 1971, respectively, and in 1972 the firm moved from downtown Stamford to suburban New Canaan. McNulty and von Brock retired in 1973 and 1982, followed shortly thereafter by Taylor. Willis N. Mills Jr. led the firm in the 1980s and 1990s in association with several new principals, including Ellen Glenn Golden, Andrew J. Santella, Robert C. Steinmetz, Leonard M. Sussman and Lee A. Wright. In 1998 the firm was acquired by Perkins Eastman of New York City and moved its offices back to Stamford. In 2000 SMS Architects was fully merged with Perkins Eastman, which still maintains a Stamford office.

== Legacy ==
Sherwood, Mills & Smith developed the largest architectural practice in the suburban regions of the New York metropolitan area and was the undisputed architectural leader in Stamford and Fairfield County. Their works were built throughout the New York area and the Mid-Atlantic states. They were known for the high quality of design of their works, and by the 1970s had won more design awards than any other architecture firm in Connecticut.

The partners of Sherwood, Mills & Smith and SMS were widely respected by their peers. Both of the Mills, McNulty, Sherwood, Smith, Taylor and von Brock were all elected Fellows of the American Institute of Architects (AIA), and they and other principals served in leadership roles in the Connecticut chapter and on national AIA committees.

In recent years several of their works, particularly in New Canaan, have been listed on the United States National Register of Historic Places.

== Architectural works ==
- 1949 – Durisol House, 43 Marshall Ridge Rd, New Canaan, Connecticut
  - NRHP-listed.
- 1950 – South School, (Note: Designed in association with O'Connor & Kilham of New York City.) 8 Farm Rd, New Canaan, Connecticut
- 1953 – Refectory, Kent School, Kent, Connecticut
- 1954 – Christopher H. Knoll house, Turtle Back Rd, New Canaan, Connecticut
  - Demolished.
- 1954 – Newfield Elementary School, 345 Pepper Ridge Rd, Stamford, Connecticut
- 1954 – North Street School, 381 North St, Greenwich, Connecticut
- 1954 – Schools, Port Chester, New York
  - Unlocated.
- 1955 – Gymnasium, Kent School, Kent, Connecticut
- 1955 – Ramapo High School, 331 George St, Franklin Lakes, New Jersey
- 1955 – Sharon Center School, 80 Hilltop Rd, Sharon, Connecticut
- 1955 – Veterans Park Elementary School, 8 Governor St, Ridgefield, Connecticut
- 1956 – Nathan Hale Elementary School, 277 Atkins St Ext, Meriden, Connecticut
- 1956 – Willis N. Mills house, 1380 Ponus Ridge Rd, New Canaan, Connecticut
  - NRHP-listed.
- 1957 – Osborn School, 10 Osborn Rd, Rye, New York
- 1957 – Winsted Health Center, 115 Spencer St, Winsted, Connecticut
- 1958 – First Presbyterian Church, (Note: Designed in association with Harrison & Abramovitz of New York City. Wallace K. Harrison was chiefly responsible for the sanctuary while Sherwood, Mills & Smith were responsible for the other parish buildings and general supervision.) 1101 Bedford St, Stamford, Connecticut
  - NRHP-listed.
- 1958 – Master plan, Kent School, Kent, Connecticut
- 1958 – Dorr-Oliver headquarters, 77 Havemeyer Ln, Stamford, Connecticut
  - Demolished.
- 1958 – Anya Seton house, 43 Binney Ln, Old Greenwich, Connecticut
  - Demolished.
- 1959 – Barden Corporation plant, 200 Park Ave, Danbury, Connecticut
- 1959 – Lee F. Jackson School, 2 Saratoga Rd, White Plains, New York
- 1959 – Mutual Insurance Company of Hartford building, (Note: Featuring a cast concrete mural by Costantino Nivola.) 95 Woodland St, Hartford, Connecticut
- 1959 – Rehabilitation Center for the Physically Handicapped, 26 Palmers Hill Rd, Stamford, Connecticut
  - Demolished.
- 1959 – Ridge Elementary School, 325 W Ridgewood Ave, Ridgewood, New Jersey
- 1959 – Staples High School, 70 North Ave, Westport, Connecticut
- 1959 – Stony Point Center, 17 Cricketown Rd, Stony Point, New York
- 1959 – William B. Ward Elementary School, 311 Broadfield Rd, New Rochelle, New York
- 1960 – Naugatuck High School, 543 Rubber Ave, Naugatuck, Connecticut
- 1960 – Parkway School, 141 Lower Cross Rd, Greenwich, Connecticut
- 1961 – Bedwell Elementary School, 141 Seney Dr, Bernardsville, New Jersey
- 1961 – First College, Princeton University, Princeton, New Jersey
- 1961 – Huntington High School, 188 Oakwood Rd, Huntington, New York
- 1961 – Kakiat Junior High School (former), 465 Viola Rd, Spring Valley, New York
- 1961 – Master plan and buildings, Greenwich Academy, Greenwich Academy
- 1961 – Master plan and Hillside House, Briarcliff College, Briarcliff Manor, New York
- 1961 – Mount Vernon High School, 100 California Rd, Mount Vernon, New York
- 1961 – Pascack Valley High School, 200 Piermont Ave, Hillsdale, New Jersey
- 1961 – Prince Engineering Lab, Brown University, Providence, Rhode Island
- 1961 – St. Mark's Episcopal Church, 111 Oenoke Ridge Rd, New Canaan, Connecticut
  - NRHP-listed.
- 1964 – Burndy Library, Richards Ave, Norwalk, Connecticut
  - Demolished.
- 1964 – Towers Hall, Wagner College, Staten Island
- 1965 – Barus and Holley Building, Brown University, Providence, Rhode Island
- 1965 – Helen Keller Middle School, 360 Sport Hill Rd, Easton, Connecticut
- 1966 – Hurlbutt Elementary School, 9 School Rd, Weston, Connecticut
- 1968 – Harborview Hall, Wagner College, Staten Island
- 1968 – Lime Kiln Elementary School, 35 Lime Kiln Rd, Suffern, New York
- 1969 – Hudson River Museum, 511 Warburton Ave, Yonkers, New York
- 1970 – Nathan L. Whetten Graduate Center, University of Connecticut, Storrs, Connecticut
- 1971 – St. Matthew's Episcopal Church–Wilton Presbyterian Church, 36 and 48 New Canaan Rd, Wilton, Connecticut
- 1972 – United States Tennis Association headquarters, 70 W Red Oak Ln, White Plains, New York
- 1973 – AT&T long lines building, 522 Fairfield Ave, Bridgeport, Connecticut
- 1973 – Olmsted Hall, Vassar College, Poughkeepsie, New York
- 1975 – F. N. Manross Memorial Library, 260 Central St, Bristol, Connecticut
- 1977 – Nyala Farms, 60 Nyala Farms Rd, Westport, Connecticut
- 1983 – Round Hill Community Church, 395 Round Hill Rd, Greenwich, Connecticut
- 1988 – Metro Center, (Note: Designed in association with Skidmore, Owings & Merrill of New York City.) 1 Station Pl, Stamford, Connecticut
