= Tom Culligan =

Canadian entrepreneur and author (born 1945)

- Born: 1945 (age 80–81); Belledune, New Brunswick
- Education: Degree in theology and philosophy, University of Dayton
- Occupations: Entrepreneur and author

Tom Culligan (born 1945) is a Canadian entrepreneur, author, and painter, best known as the co-founder of the Second Cup coffeehouse chain.

Culligan was born in Belledune, New Brunswick.

In 1975, he teamed up with Frank O'Dea to found the Second Cup chain of coffee shops. He eventually bought out O'Dea. After building the business to a 150-store chain, he sold it in 1988 to Michael Bregman, the founder of MMMarvelous Muffins.

Culligan has a degree in theology and philosophy from the University of Dayton at Dayton, Ohio. In September 2002 he self-published the book Teacups & Sticky Buns.

He currently devotes himself full-time to painting and writing, dividing his time between a cottage in the Muskoka Region of Ontario, his family's homestead built in 1824 on Chaleur Bay in northern New Brunswick, and a winter home in Florida with his partner Paul Menard.
