= Street Kids International =

Canadian charity

- Company type: Charity
- Founded: 1988
- Headquarters: Canada / UK
- Website: www.streetkids.org

Street Kids International (or Street Kids) was a Canadian-based non-governmental organization founded in 1988 by Peter Dalglish and Frank O'Dea. The organization focused on three main programmes for street children: street health, street work and street rights. In 2008, Street Kids International expanded its operations to the United Kingdom with Street Kids International UK.

== History ==
During the Second Sudanese War that began in 1983, Peter Dalglish worked in Sudan as a field worker for the United Nations. While in Sudan, Dalglish organized the first technical training school for street children in the country. The vocational school trained street youth to become apprentice mechanics, welders and electricians. In 2019, Dalglish was convicted in Nepal of sexually assaulting two boys, aged 11 and 14, and sentenced to eight years in prison.

=== 1988–2009 ===
In 1988 Street Kids International was registered as a charity in Canada and in 1989, it released the animation Karate Kids. The film, which later won the Peter F. Drucker Award for Non-Profit Innovation in 1993, addresses health related issues faced by street youth.

Following Karate Kids, Street Kids International developed a second animation titled Goldtooth which won the UNICEF Prize at the 1996 Ottawa International Film Festival. Both films were directed by Derek Lamb, an Academy Award-winning animation filmmaker and producer.

In 2001, the organization released another animation, Speed’s Choice, about street entrepreneurship. According to the Street Kids International website, the film is a component of their Street Work programme. In 2007 the organization was recognized by CIDA (Canadian International Development Agency) for its Long-Term Commitment to International Cooperation.

In January 2015, Save the Children and Street Kids International announced that they would merge.

"Becoming part of Save the Children will allow Street Kids International to dramatically increase its capacity and empower more youth to build sustainable futures for themselves and their families," said Prea Grover, Executive Director, Street Kids International. "We have partnered with Save the Children in many countries to create a lasting impact for the children and youth. By coming together, we can only increase this impact."

== Chronology ==
- 1987 Street Kids International Bicycle Courier Service operational in Khartoum, Sudan.
- 1989 Karate Kids animation about street youth and sexual health premieres.
- 1993 Karate Kids animation wins Drucker Award for Non-Profit Innovation
- 1995 Goldtooth animation about street youth and drug use premieres.
- 1996 Goldtooth receives UNICEF's Meena Prize
- 2001 Speed’s Choice animation about street children's entrepreneurialism, premieres.
- 2007 Recipient of the CME and CIDA Special Recognition Award for Long-Term Commitment to International Cooperation
- 2007 Established Street Kids UK, and joined the Consortium for Street Children based in the UK.
- 2007 Finalist for the Conrad N. Hilton Humanitarian Prize.
- 2015 Street Kids International and Save the Children merged to become Save the Children.
