= Deborah Scroggins =

American journalist and author

- Born: November 27, 1961 (age 64); Atlanta, Georgia, U.S.
- Education: Tulane University; Columbia University
- Occupations: Journalist; author

Deborah Scroggins (born November 27, 1961) is an American journalist and author. She heads the Research and Analysis Directorate, Special Inspector General for Afghanistan Reconstruction.

== Early life ==
Deborah Lane Scroggins was born 27 November 1961, in Atlanta, Georgia, as the daughter of Gloria (née Baker, a personnel agent) and Frank William Scroggins (a lawyer).

Scroggins graduated in the Class of 1978 at Chamblee High School.

She is a graduate of Tulane University, B.A., 1982 and Columbia University, Master of International Affairs, 1985.

Scroggins received the ITT International Fellowship, Institute of International Education, 1982-1983, for a year of independent study, in Denmark.

== Career ==
She was a free-lance writer, for Inter Press Service, 1984-1985. She was an editor, United Nations Association of New York, in New York City, 1985-1987.

She was a reporter and editor for the Atlanta Journal-Constitution from 1987 to 1998, and a foreign correspondent for the Atlanta Journal-Constitution from 1988 to 1993. She later served as assistant political editor at the Atlanta Journal-Constitution.

She has written for Granta, The Independent, The Sunday Times Magazine, Vogue and other publications.

Colin Campbell and Deborah Scroggins won The Eric and Amy Burger Award 1988, from the Overseas Press Club of America, for "The Famine Weapon in the Horn of Africa".

She won Georgia Author of the Year, 2003, two Overseas Press Club Awards, a Sigma Delta Chi Award, and the Robert F. Kennedy Award for her coverage of Africa and Asia, including Afghanistan.

Her book Emma's War: An Aid Worker, Radical Islam and the Politics of Oil - A True Story of Love and Death in the Sudan is about Emma McCune, a British aid worker who married Sudanese warlord Riek Machar. It won the 2003 Ron Ridenhour Award for Truth-Telling.

Director Tony Scott had planned to direct a film based on the book and initial reports indicated that Nicole Kidman would star as McCune. The project was in development at the time of Scott's death in 2012; its fate following Scott's death remains unclear.

Scroggins has also written a second book: Wanted Women: Faith, Lies, and the War on Terror: The Lives of Ayaan Hirsi Ali and Aafia Siddiqui, an examination of the militant Islam movement through the lives of two women on opposite sides of the spectrum: Ayaan Hirsi Ali and Aafia Siddiqui.

== Personal life ==
Scroggins married Colin Campbell, February 20, 1993. They have two daughters.

== Works ==
- Emma's War: An Aid Worker, a Warlord, Radical Islam, the Politics of Oil and Slaves — A True Story of Love and Death in Sudan. New York: Vintage. 2002. ISBN 9780307808851. OCLC 70772490.
- Wanted Women: Faith, Lies, and the War on Terror: The Lives of Ayaan Hirsi Ali and Aafia Siddiqui. Harper Collins. 17 January 2012. ISBN 9780062097958.
