= Insulating concrete form =

Construction material

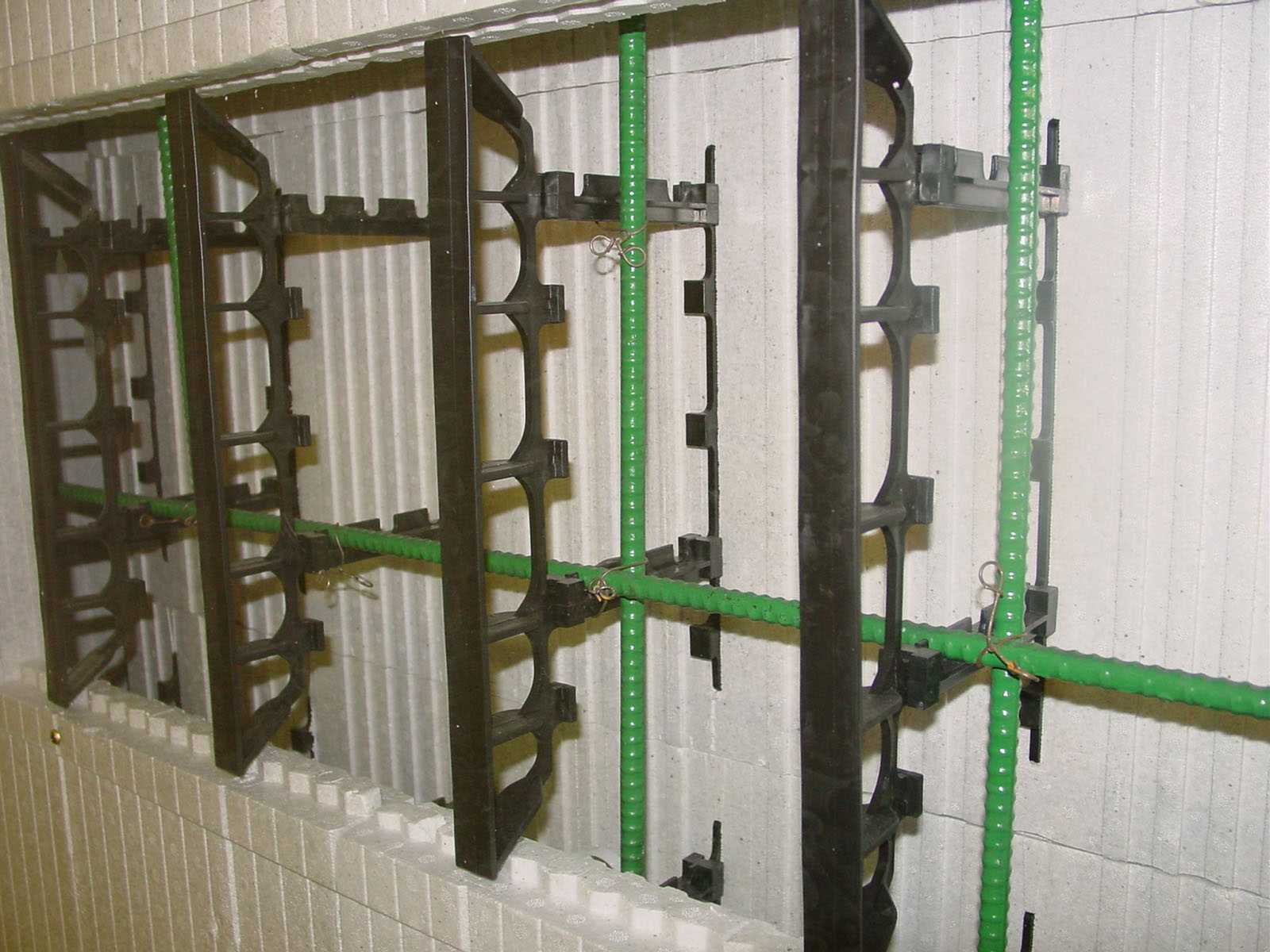
This polystyrene insulated concrete form is cut away to show the inner structure of the formwork and the reinforcing bar (rebar). The cavity is filled with concrete to create the permanent wall.

Insulating concrete forms or insulated concrete forms (ICF) are a building system to create reinforced concrete walls or floors with integral insulation. They are dry-stacked (without mortar) and filled with concrete. The units interlock somewhat like Lego bricks and create the formwork for reinforced concrete that becomes the structural walls, floors or roofs of a building. The forms stay in place after the concrete is cured and provide a permanent interior and exterior substrate for finishes. The forms come in different shapes, sizes and are made from different materials depending on the manufacturer. ICF construction has become commonplace for both low rise commercial and high performance residential construction as more stringent energy efficiency and natural disaster resistant building codes are adopted.

== Development ==
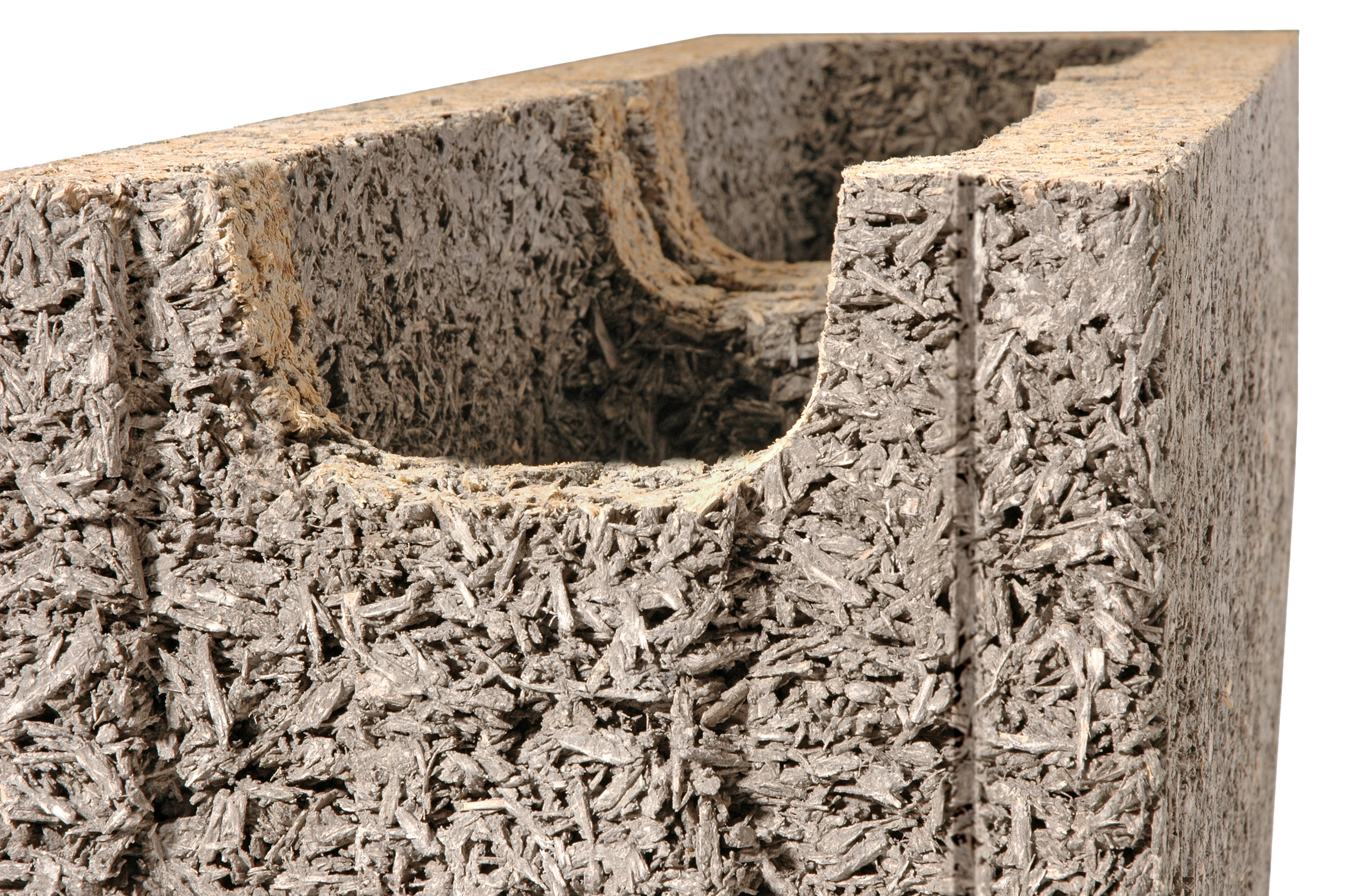
An example of the originally patented insulated concrete form made from cement bonded wood fiber

The first expanded polystyrene ICF Wall forms were developed in the late 1960s with the expiration of the original patent and the advent of modern foam plastics by BASF. Canadian contractor Werner Gregori filed the first patent for a foam concrete form in 1966 with a block "measuring 16 inches high by 48 inches long with a tongue-and-groove interlock, metal ties, and a waffle-grid core." It is right to point out that a primordial form of ICF formwork dates back to 1907, as evidenced by the patent entitled “building-block”, inventor L. R. Franklin. This patent claimed a parallelepiped-shaped brick having a central cylindrical cavity, connected to the upper and lower faces by countersink.

The adoption of ICF construction has steadily increased since the 1970s, though it was initially hampered by lack of awareness, building codes, and confusion caused by many different manufacturers selling slightly different ICF designs rather than focusing on industry standardization. ICF construction is now part of most building codes and accepted in most jurisdictions in the developed world.

== Construction ==
Reinforcing steel bars (rebar) are usually placed inside the forms before concrete is poured to give the concrete flexural strength, similar to bridges and high-rise buildings made of reinforced concrete. Like other concrete formwork, the forms are filled with concrete in 1-foot to 4-foot high "lifts" to manage the concrete pressure and reduce the risk of blowouts.

After the concrete has cured, the forms are left in place permanently to provide a variety of benefits, depending on materials used:

- Thermal insulation
- Soundproofing
- Good surface burning characteristics rating
- Space to run electrical conduit and plumbing. The form material on either side of the walls can easily accommodate electrical and plumbing installations.
- Backing for drywall or other finishes on the interior and stucco, brick, or other siding on the exterior
- Improved indoor air quality
- Regulated humidity levels and mitigated mold growth (hygric buffer)

== Categorization ==
Insulating concrete forms are commonly categorized in three manners. Organizations whose first concern relates to the concrete structure classify them first by the shape of the concrete inside the form. Organizations whose first concern relates to the material or fabrication of the forms classify them first by the characteristics of the forms themselves.

=== By concrete shape ===
==== Flat Wall System ====
For Flat Wall System ICFs, the concrete has the shape of a flat wall of solid reinforced concrete, similar to the shape of a concrete wall constructed using removable forms.

==== Grid System ====
===== Screen Grid System =====
For Screen Grid System ICFs, the concrete has the shape of the metal in a screen, with horizontal and vertical channels of reinforced concrete separated by areas of solid form material.

===== Waffle Grid System =====
For Waffle Grid System ICFs, the concrete has the shape of a hybrid between Screen Grid and Flat Wall system concrete, with a grid of thicker reinforced concrete and having thinner concrete in the center areas where a screen grid would have solid ICF material..

==== Post and Lintel System ====
For Post and Lintel System ICFs, the concrete has a horizontal member, called a lintel, only at the top of the wall (Horizontal concrete at the bottom of the wall is often present in the form of the building's footer or the lintel of the wall below.) and vertical members, called posts, between the lintel and the surface on which the wall is resting.

=== By material ===
==== Polystyrene/Polyurethane based ====
Most common material for insulated concrete forms is either expanded or extruded polystyrene. Polyurethane (including soy-based foam) are also available.

==== Cement based ====
These ICFs include forms made from cement-bonded wood fiber, cement-bonded polystyrene beads and cellular concrete

=== By form characteristic ===
==== Block ====
The exterior shape of the ICF is similar to that of a Concrete masonry unit, although ICF blocks are often larger in size as they are made from a material having a lower specific gravity. Very frequently, the edges of block ICFs are made to interlock, reducing or eliminating the need for the use of a bonding material between the blocks.

==== Panel ====
Panel ICFs have the flat rectangular shape of a section of flat wall they are often the height of the wall and have a width limited by the manipulability of the material at larger sizes and by the general usefulness of the panel size for constructing walls.

==== Plank ====
Plank ICFs have the size of Block ICFs in one dimension and Panel ICFs in the other dimension.

== Characteristics ==
=== Energy efficiency ===
- Minimal, if any, air leaks, which improves comfort and reduces heat loss compared to walls without a solid air barrier
- High thermal resistance (R-value) typically above 3 K⋅m^{2}/W (in US customary units: R-17); this results in saving energy compared with uninsulated masonry (see comparison)
- Continuous insulation without thermal bridges or "insulation gaps", as is common in framed construction
- Thermal mass, when used well and combined with passive solar design, can play an important role in further reductions in energy use, especially in climates where it is common to have outside temperatures swing above inside temperatures during the day and below at night.

=== Strength ===
- Insulating concrete forms create a structural concrete wall, either monolithic or post and beam, that is up to ten times stronger than wood framed structures.
- Structural integrity for better resistance to forces of nature, compared to framed walls.
- The components of ICF systems — both the poured concrete and the material used to make the ICF — do not rot when they get wet.

=== Sound absorption ===
ICF walls have much lower rates of acoustic transmission. Standard thickness ICF walls have shown sound transmission coefficients (STC) between 46 and 72 compared to 36 for standard fiberglass insulation and drywall. The level of sound attenuation achieved is a function of wall thickness, mass, component materials and air tightness.

=== Fire protection ===
ICF walls can have four- to six-hour fire resistance rating and negligible surface burning properties. The International Building Code: 2603.5.2 requires plastic foam insulation (e.g. Polystyrene foam, Polyurethane foam) to be separated from the building interior by a thermal barrier (e.g. drywall), regardless of the fire barrier provided by the central concrete. Forms made from cement bonded – wood fibers (eg), polystyrene beads (e.g.), or air (i.e. cellular concrete – e.g.) have a fire rating inherently.

=== Indoor air quality ===
Because they are generally constructed without a sheet plastic vapor barrier, ICF walls can regulate humidity levels, mitigate the potential for mold and facilitate a more comfortable interior while maintaining high thermal performance. Foams, however, can give off gasses, something that is not well studied.

=== Environmental sensitivity ===
ICF walls can be made with a variety of recycled materials that can minimize the environmental impact of the building. The large volume of concrete used in ICF walls has been criticized, as concrete production is a large contributor to greenhouse gas emissions.

=== Vermin ===
Because the entire interior space of ICF walls is continuously occupied (no gaps as can occur between blown or fiberglass insulation and a wood frame wall) they pose more difficulty for casual transit by insects and vermin. Additionally, while plastic foam forms can occasionally be tunneled through, interior concrete wall, and the Portland cement of cement-bonded type forms create a much more challenging barrier to insects and vermin than do walls made of wood.

== Building design considerations ==
When designing a building to be constructed with ICF walls, consideration must be given to supporting the weight of any walls not resting directly on other walls or the building's foundation. Consideration must also be given to the understanding that the load-bearing part of an ICF wall is the concrete, which, without special preparations, does not extend in any direction to the edge of the form. For grid and post & lintel systems, the placement of vertical members of the concrete must be organized in such a fashion (e.g., starting at opposite corners or breaks (e.g. doorways) and working to meet in unbroken wall) as to properly transfer load from the lintel (or bond beam) to the surface supporting the wall.

In Australia, ICF products are considered to be combustible as they have not passed AS 1530.1-1994 lab testing. Nevertheless they have achieved AS 1530.8.1-2007 accreditation for use in some bushfire prone areas. Their application is limited to low rise commercial & residential.

== Building process ==
ICF construction is less demanding, owing to its modularity. Less-skilled labor can be employed to lay the ICF forms, though careful consideration must be made when pouring the concrete to make sure it consolidates fully and cures evenly without cracking. Unlike traditional wood beam construction, no additional structural support other than temporary scaffolding is required for openings, doors, windows, or utilities, though modifying the structure after the concrete cures requires special concrete cutting tools.

=== Floors and foundations ===
ICF walls are conventionally placed on a monolithic slab with embedded rebar dowels connecting the walls to the foundation.

ICF decking is becoming an increasingly popular addition to general ICF wall construction. ICF decking weighs up to 40% less than standard concrete flooring and provides superior insulation. ICF decking can also be designed in conjunction with ICF walls to form a continuous monolithic structure joined together by rebar. ICF deck roofs are popular in storm-areas, but it is harder to build complex roof shapes and concrete can be poured only up to a point on angled surfaces, often 7:12 maximum pitch.

=== Walls ===
ICF walls are constructed one row at a time, usually starting at the corners and working toward the middle of the walls. End blocks are then cut to fit so as to waste the least material possible. As the wall rises, blocks are staggered to avoid long vertical seams that can weaken the polystyrene formwork. Structure frames known as bucks are placed around openings to give added strength to the openings and to serve as attachment points for windows and doors.

Interior and exterior finishes and facades are affixed directly to the ICF surface or tie ends, depending on the type of ICF. Brick and masonry facades require an extended ledge or shelf angle at the main floor level, but otherwise no modifications are necessary. Interior ICF polystyrene wall surfaces must be covered with drywall panels or other wall coatings. During the first months immediately after construction, minor problems with interior humidity may be evident as the concrete cures, which can damage the drywall. Dehumidification can be accomplished with small residential dehumidifiers or using the building's air conditioning system.

Depending on the experience of the contractor and their quality of work, improperly installed exterior foam insulation could be easy access for groundwater and insects. To help prevent these problems, some manufacturers make insecticide-treated foam blocks and promote installation of drainage sheeting and other methods for waterproofing. Drain tiles are installed to eliminate water.

=== Plumbing and electrical ===
Plumbing and electrical conduit can be placed inside the forms and poured into place, though settling problems could cause pipes to break, creating costly repairs. For this reason, plumbing and conduit as well as electrical cables are usually embedded directly into the foam before the wall coverings are applied. A hot knife or electric chainsaw is commonly used to create openings in the foam to lay piping and cabling. electrical cables are inserted into the ICF using a Cable Punch. while ICFs made from other materials are typically cut or routed with simple carpentry tools. Versions of simple carpentry tools suitable for cement-bonded type forms are made for similar use with autoclaved aerated concrete.

== Cost ==
The initial cost of using ICFs rather than conventional construction techniques is sensitive to the price of materials and labor, but building using ICF may add 3 to 5 percent to the total purchase price over building using wood frame. In most cases ICF construction will cost about 40% less than conventional (basement) construction because of the labor savings from combining multiple steps into one step. Above grade, ICF construction is typically more expensive, but when adding large openings, ICF construction becomes very cost effective. Large openings in conventional construction require large headers and supporting posts, whereas ICF construction reduces the cost, as only reinforcing steel is needed directly around the opening.

ICF construction can allow up to 60% smaller heating and cooling units to service the same floor area, which can cut the cost of the final house by an estimated $0.75 per square foot. So, the estimated net extra cost can be as much as $0.25 to $3.25. ICF homes can also qualify for tax credits in some jurisdictions ((cn)), further lowering the costs.

ICF buildings are less expensive over time, as they require less energy to heat and cool the same size space compared to a variety of other common construction methods. Additionally, insurance costs can be much lower, as ICF homes are much less susceptible to damage from earthquakes, floods, hurricanes, fires, and other natural disasters. Maintenance and upkeep costs are also lessened, as ICF buildings do not contain wood, which can rot over time or be attacked by insects and rodents.

== Advantages ==
In seismic and hurricane-prone areas, ICF construction provides strength, impact-resistance, durability, excellent sound insulation, and airtightness. ICF construction is ideal in moderate and mixed climates with significant daily temperature variations, in buildings designed to benefit from thermal mass strategies.

Insulating R-Value alone (R-value) of ICFs range from R-12 to R-28, which can be a good R-value for walls. The energy savings compared to framed walls is in a range of 50% to 70%.

== Disadvantages ==
ICF buildings may be more difficult to remodel than conventionally framed structures because specialized tools and methods are required to cut the concrete walls.

In the United Kingdom, buildings constructed using ICF may be unsuitable for homeowners wishing to free up capital using equity release.

== See also ==
- Polystyrene
- Reinforced concrete
- Thermal insulation
- Energy conversion efficiency
- Energy conservation
