= Cement-bonded wood fiber =

Composite material

Cement-bonded wood fiber is a composite material manufactured throughout the world. It is made from wood (usually waste wood), chipped into a specially graded aggregate that is then mineralized and combined with Portland cement. Although the combination of wood and cement paste has been shown to result in a degradation (hydrolysis) of wood, the mineralization process renders the wood inert and no longer susceptible to degradation.

== Uses ==
Cement-bonded wood fiber is used to manufacture a wide variety of products primarily for the construction industry (products like insulating concrete forms, siding materials and noise barriers).

Cement bonded wood fiber materials can be classified as low density, medium density and high density. The density of the material will determine to a large extent, the various properties of the end product. Other factors determining the overall performance of a cement bonded wood fiber material are:

1. Wood particle type
2. Wood particle gradation
3. Cement to wood ratio
4. Level of sugar content in the wood particle at the time of bonding

Most common is low-density cement bonded wood fiber. It is known for its use in LEED-certified projects and other types of green building. The material itself is known for its insulating and acoustic properties.

== See also ==
- Wood wool
