= Polygamy in South Sudan =

Polygamy in South Sudan is quite common. It has been connected with the chaotic state of affairs in the country. Its supporters, such as Archbishop Gabriel Roric of the Reformed Episcopal Church (an Anglican denomination), however, maintain polygamy is a source of "African pride", saying those who opposed it were misguided by the western world's approaches to marriage.

Men in South Sudan commonly marry as often as their wealth can allow – this wealth is often measured in cattle. About 40% of marriages are reportedly polygamous in this country.
