= Nivola (disambiguation) =

Nivola is a literary genre invented by Spanish author Miguel de Unamuno.

Nivola may also refer to:

- Rito della Nivola, a Catholic rite and historical reenactment held in Milan, Italy
- Alessandro Nivola (born 1972), an American actor
- Costantino Nivola (1911–1988), an Italian sculptor
- Tazio Nuvolari (1892–1953), nicknamed Nivola, an Italian racing driver
- Nivola Museum, a museum in Italy dedicated to Costantino Nivola
