= Aquarium of Genoa =

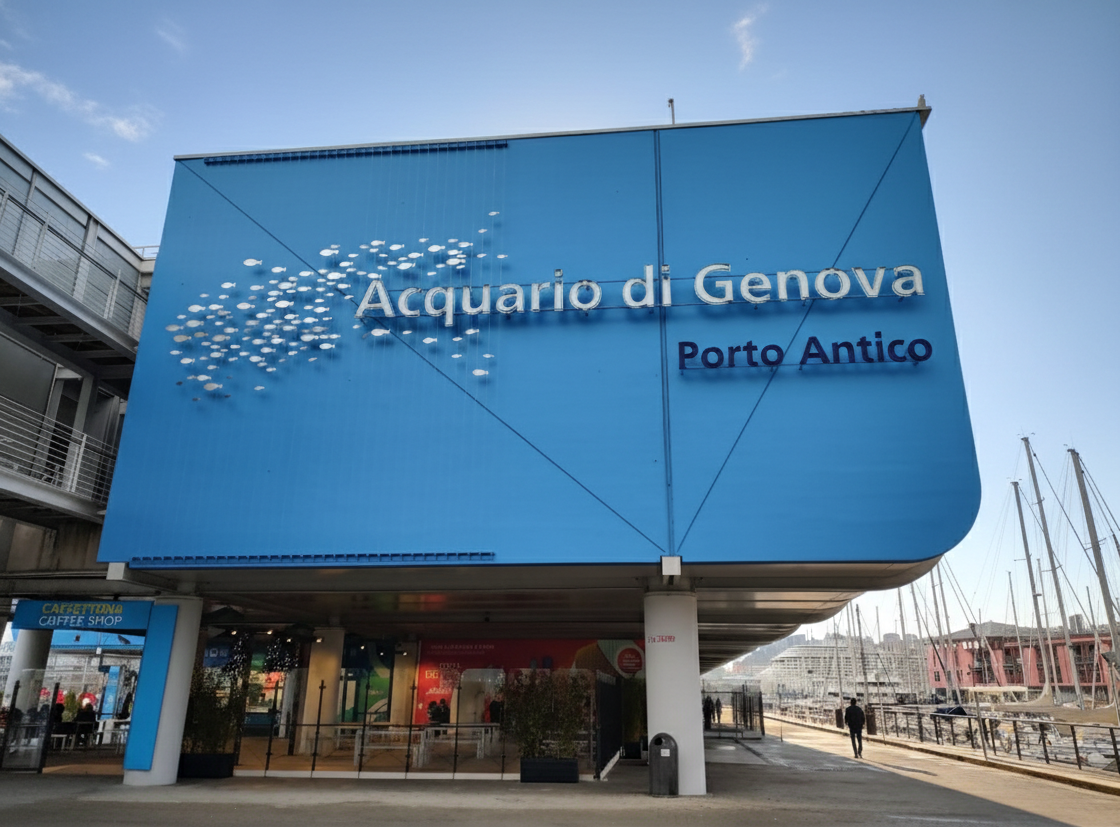
- Interactive map of Aquarium of Genoa
- 44°24′37.04″N 8°55′35.57″E
- Date opened: 1992
- Location: Old Harbour, Genoa, Italy
- Land area: 33,000 sq ft (3,100 m^{2})
- Floor space: (10,000 m^{2} (110,000 sq ft) of exhibit space)
- No. of animals: 12,000 animals
- No. of species: 500+
- Total volume of tanks: 6,000,000 litres (1,300,000 imp gal; 1,600,000 US gal)
- Annual visitors: 1.2 million+ (2008)
- Memberships: EAZA
- Major exhibits: "Cetacean Pavilion," "Shark Bay," "Jellyfish Room", "The Kingdom of Ice", "Biodiversity Pavilion"
- Website: www.acquariodigenova.it/en/

The Aquarium of Genoa (Acquario di Genova) is the largest aquarium in Italy and one of the most significant in Europe. It is located in the Old Harbour (Porto Antico) area of Genoa, Liguria, and was designed by the architect Renzo Piano as part of the urban redevelopment project created for the Expo 1992, celebrating the 500th anniversary of Christopher Columbus’s voyage to the Americas. The aquarium is operated by Costa Edutainment S.p.A. and is a member of the European Association of Zoos and Aquaria (EAZA). It attracts over 1.2 million visitors each year.

The facility houses around 12,000 animals representing more than 600 species, displayed in over 70 exhibition tanks that recreate marine and terrestrial ecosystems from around the world — from tropical seas to polar regions. Among its main themed areas are the Shark Bay, the Lagoon of the Sirens, the Cetacean Pavilion, and the Kingdom of Ice.

In addition to its exhibition role, the Aquarium of Genoa is actively involved in scientific research, biodiversity conservation, and environmental education, promoting educational programs and initiatives aimed at raising public awareness about marine ecosystems

== History ==
The aquarium was originally built for Genoa Expo '92 (International Exhibition Genoa '92 Colombo '92), celebrating 500 years since the Genoese sailor Christopher Columbus discovered The new world. The building, which some say looks like a ship ready to head out to sea, was designed by the Genoese architect Renzo Piano of the Renzo Piano Building Workshop. The interior design and initial exhibits for the opening in 1992 were designed by Peter Chermayeff leading a design team at Cambridge Seven Associates. In 1998 the aquarium was expanded with the addition of a 100-metre (330 ft) ship connected by walkway to the original building.

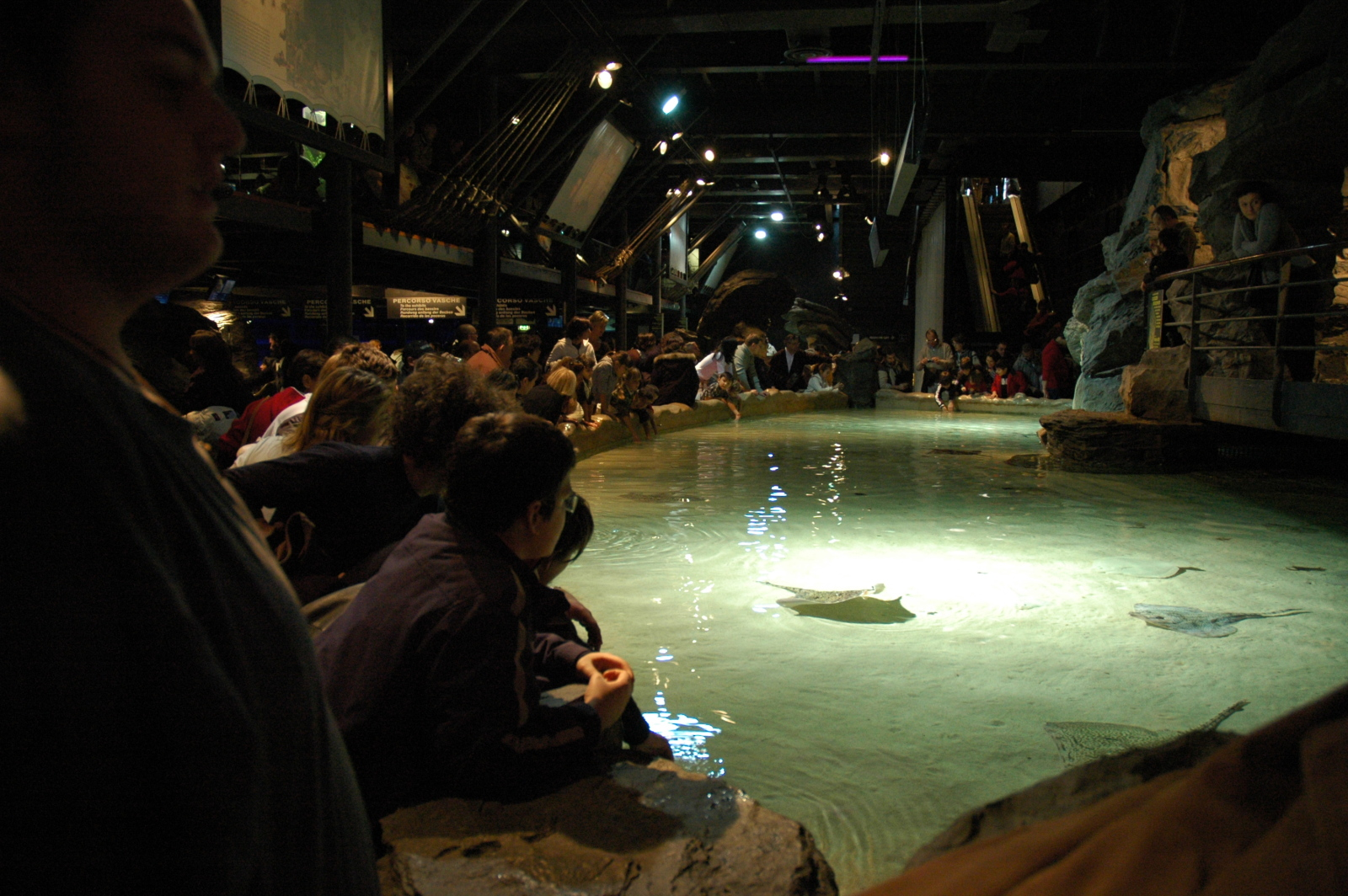
Aquarium of Genoa - The ray fish pool.

=== Exhibits ===
The Aquarium of Genoa first welcomed the public on October 12, 1993. The initial exhibition concept aimed to showcase the Ligurian Sea, the North Atlantic, and the Caribbean coral reefs through a dual lens: "one representing the New World/Old World encounter of 1492, and the other reflecting the environmental awareness of 1992 and beyond." The entire facility spans a total area of 27,000 square metres (290,000 sq ft). Housing 70 tanks with approximately 6,000,000 litres (1,600,000 US gal) of water and nearly 10,000 square metres (110,000 sq ft) of exhibition space, the aquarium is a major facility. Its largest single tank contains 1,200,000 litres (320,000 US gal). It is notably recognized for displaying the widest variety of natural ecosystems in Europe, encompassing tropical, Mediterranean, and freshwater habitats. These tanks are home to approximately 15,000 animals from 400 species, including fish, marine mammals, birds, reptiles, amphibians, and invertebrates. The collection features notable species such as bottlenose dolphins (Tursiops truncatus), West Indian manatees (Trichechus manatus), various sharks, harbor seals (Phoca vitulina), rays, boa constrictors (Boa constrictor), jellyfish, and penguins. Exhibits also incorporate specific environments, including a reconstruction of a Madagascar lagoon and four expansive ocean tanks that replicate diverse ecosystems like the Caribbean coral reef.

=== The Route ===
The standard visitor route is designed to take around 3 hours and 45 minutes and encompasses 43 tanks. This includes four open-air tanks that are part of the Cetacean Pavilion, which opened in the summer of 2013. Additionally, four large exhibition tanks offer multi-level viewing, showcasing manatees, various shark species, seals, and penguins. In the Cetacean Pavilion, dolphins can be observed both from above—through a large glass wall that incorporates an openable window—and from below, utilizing a 15-metre (49 ft) glass tunnel and a 20-metre (66 ft) acrylic panel. Public feeding sessions are held twice a day, where trainers provide details about the dolphins’ biology and daily care. The aquarium offers special programs such as Acquario Avventura ("Aquarium Adventure") and Acquario Segreto ("Secret Aquarium"), which are behind-the-scenes tours particularly suited for children. Furthermore, once a month, it holds Notte con gli Squali ("Night with the Sharks"), an overnight experience for up to 35 children (aged 7–18). This allows participants to sleep directly in front of the shark tank and observe the animals' nocturnal behavior.

== Water management ==
The water used in the Genoa Aquarium is sourced directly from the open sea through an underwater intake system located several miles off the Ligurian coast. A tanker ship collects the seawater about six miles offshore and transfers it into a network of underwater pipes and reservoirs. After passing through large sand filters with a diameter of four meters, the water is sterilized in ozone towers before being distributed to the tanks through outlets positioned along the sides and under the sand at the bottom. Each tank is equipped with independent filtration, heating, and cooling systems that maintain the proper temperature, pH, and salinity for the specific marine environment and its inhabitants. For instance, the coral reef tanks are kept at around 26 °C, while the penguin habitats range between 10 °C and 15 °C. A computerized monitoring system continuously checks the chemical parameters of the water, and up to 10% of the total volume is replaced weekly depending on the tank size. The purification process combines mechanical and biological filtration to ensure optimal conditions for both animal and plant life.

== Conservation ==
The Aquarium of Genoa coordinates the AquaRing EU project, and provides scientific expertise and content for AquaRing, including documents, images, academic content, and interactive online courses, via its Online Resource Centre.

== Gallery ==
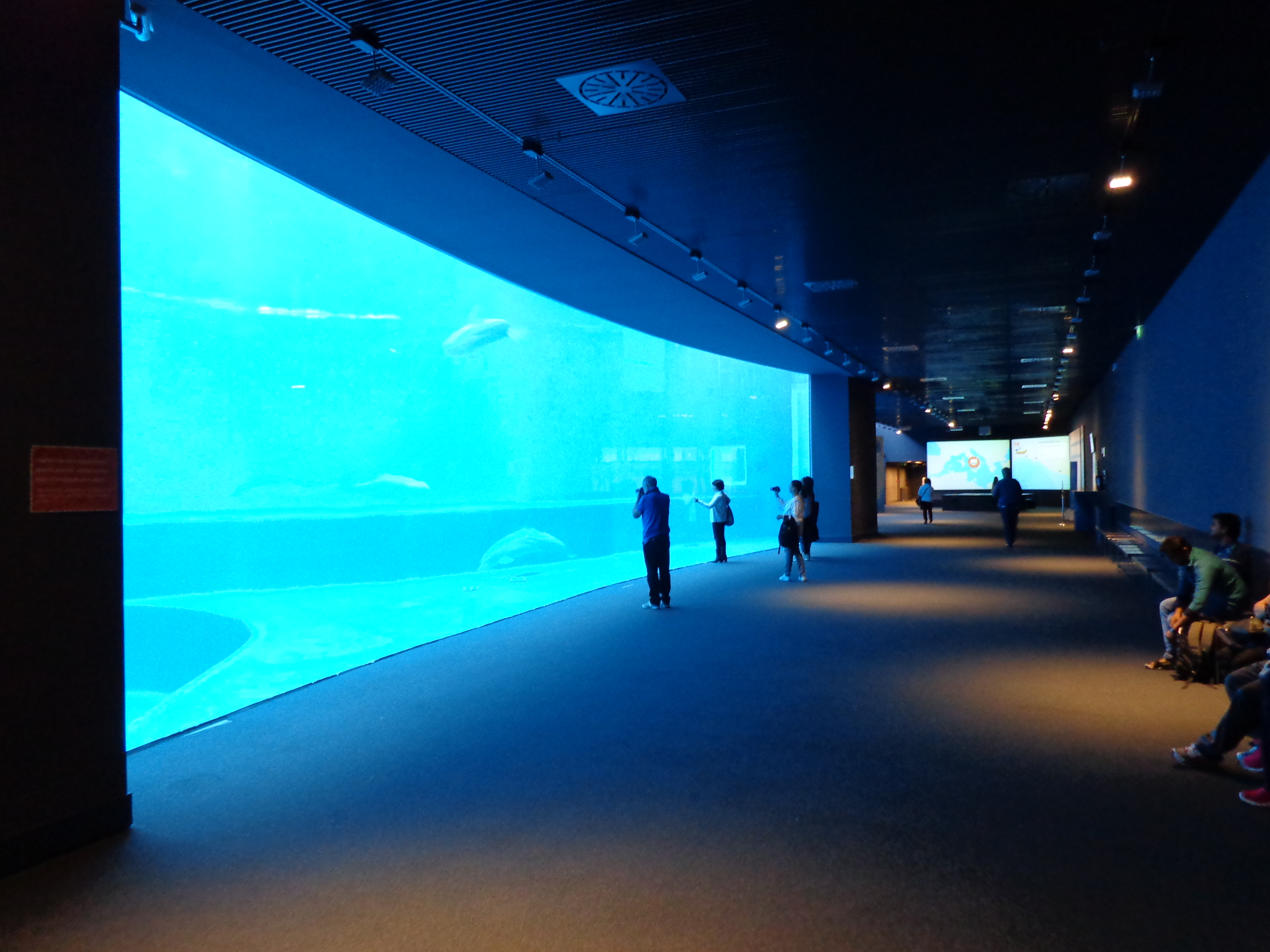
Pabellón de Cetáceos

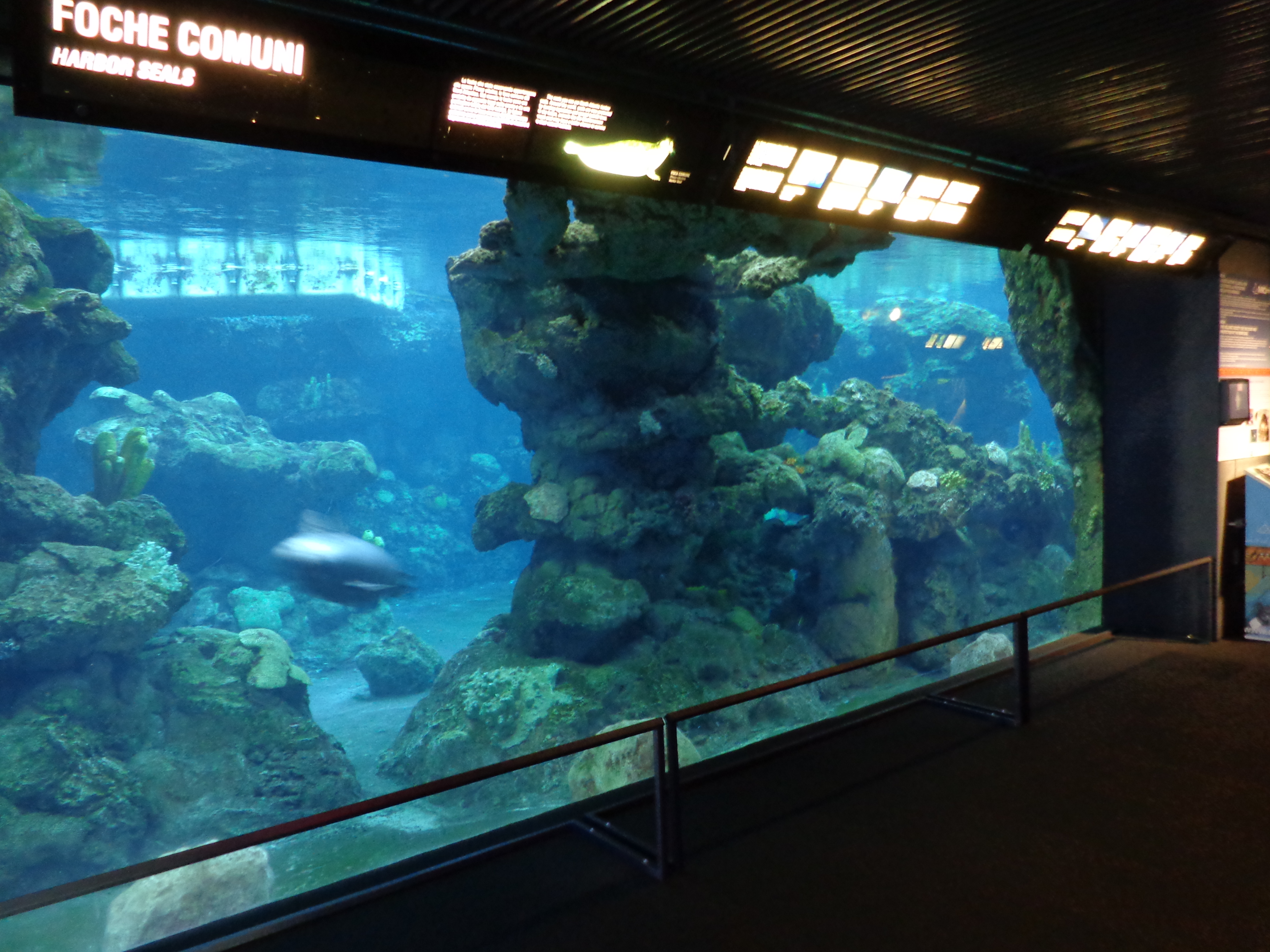

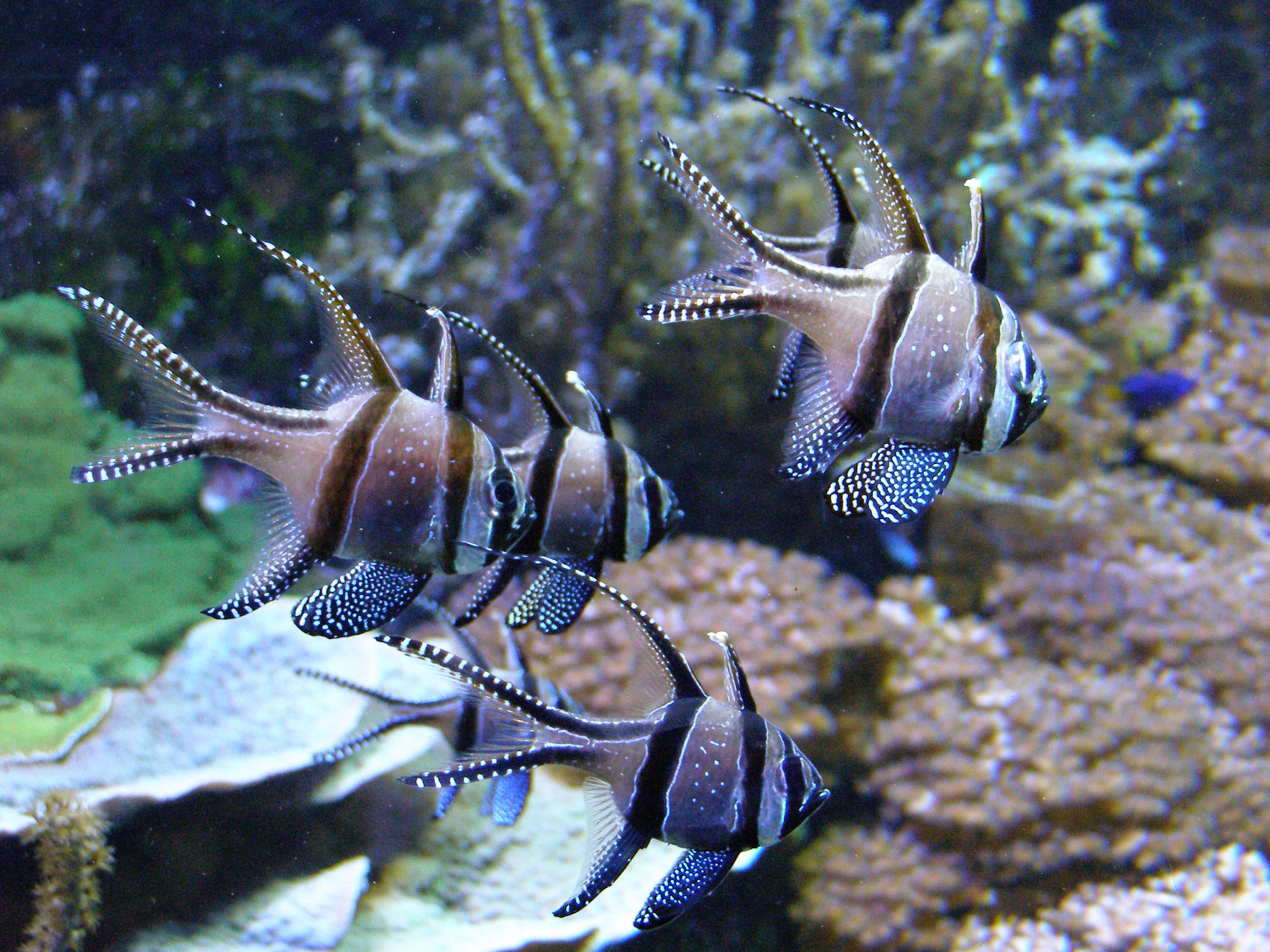
Pez cardenal de Banggai

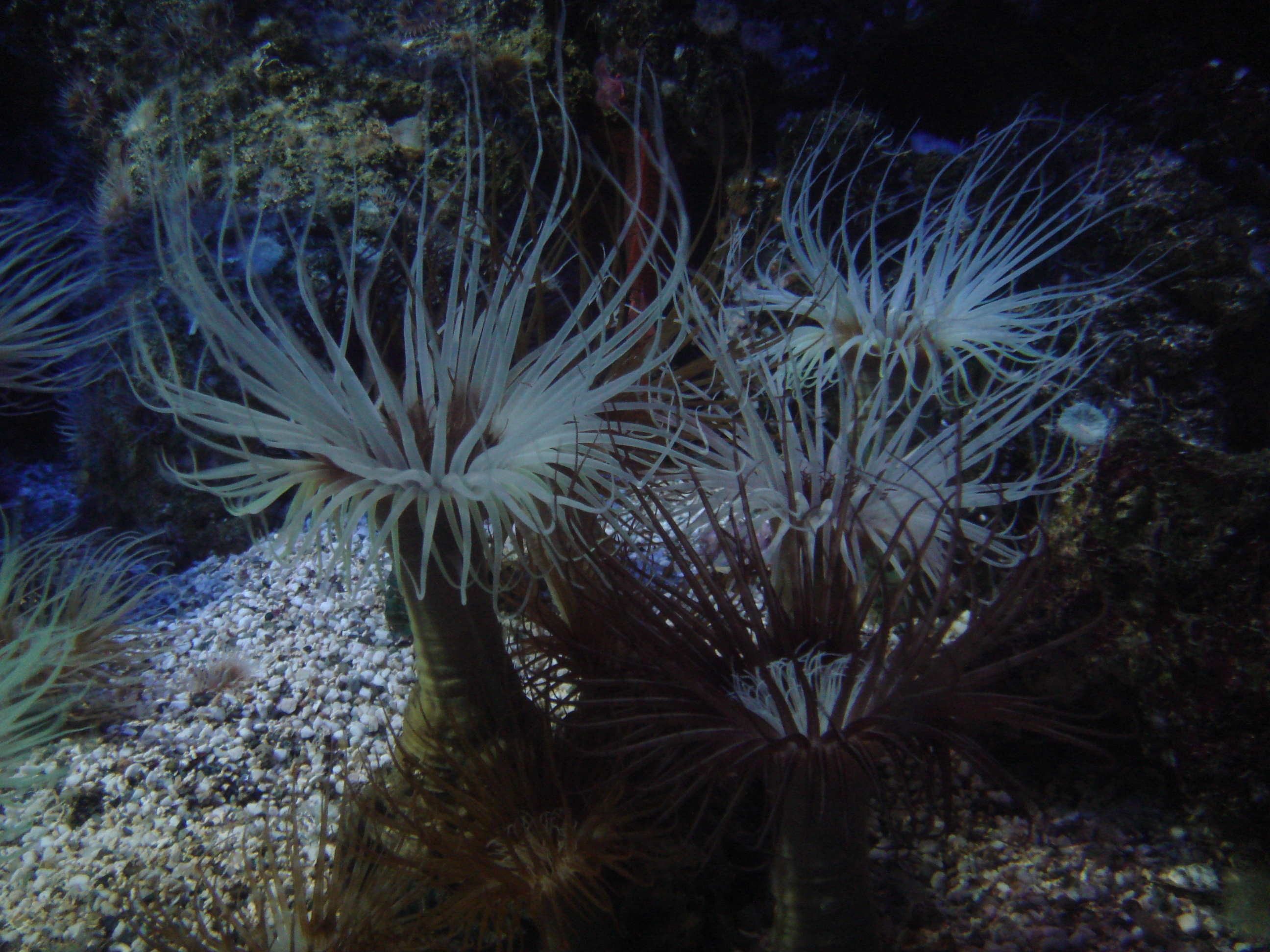

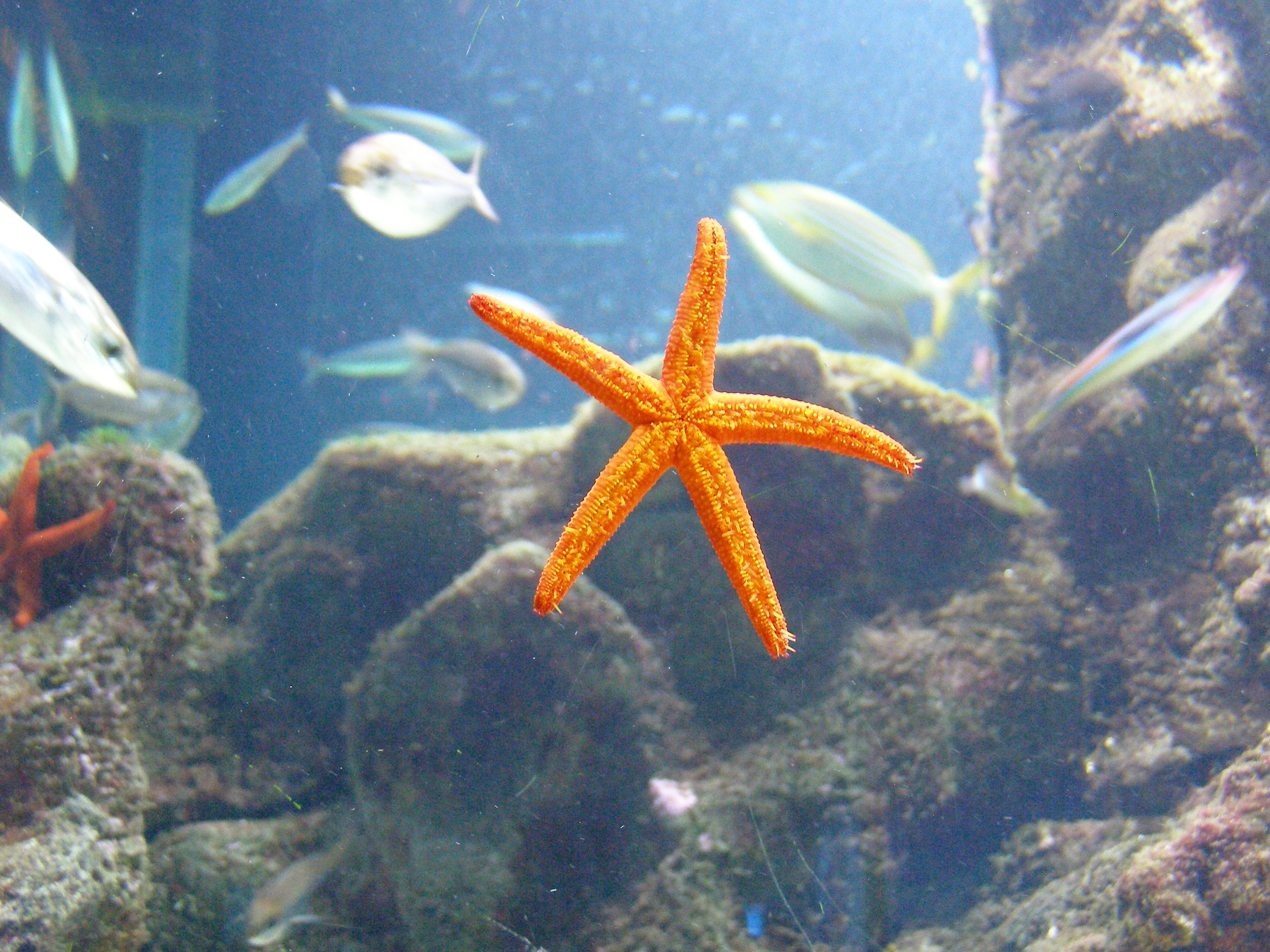

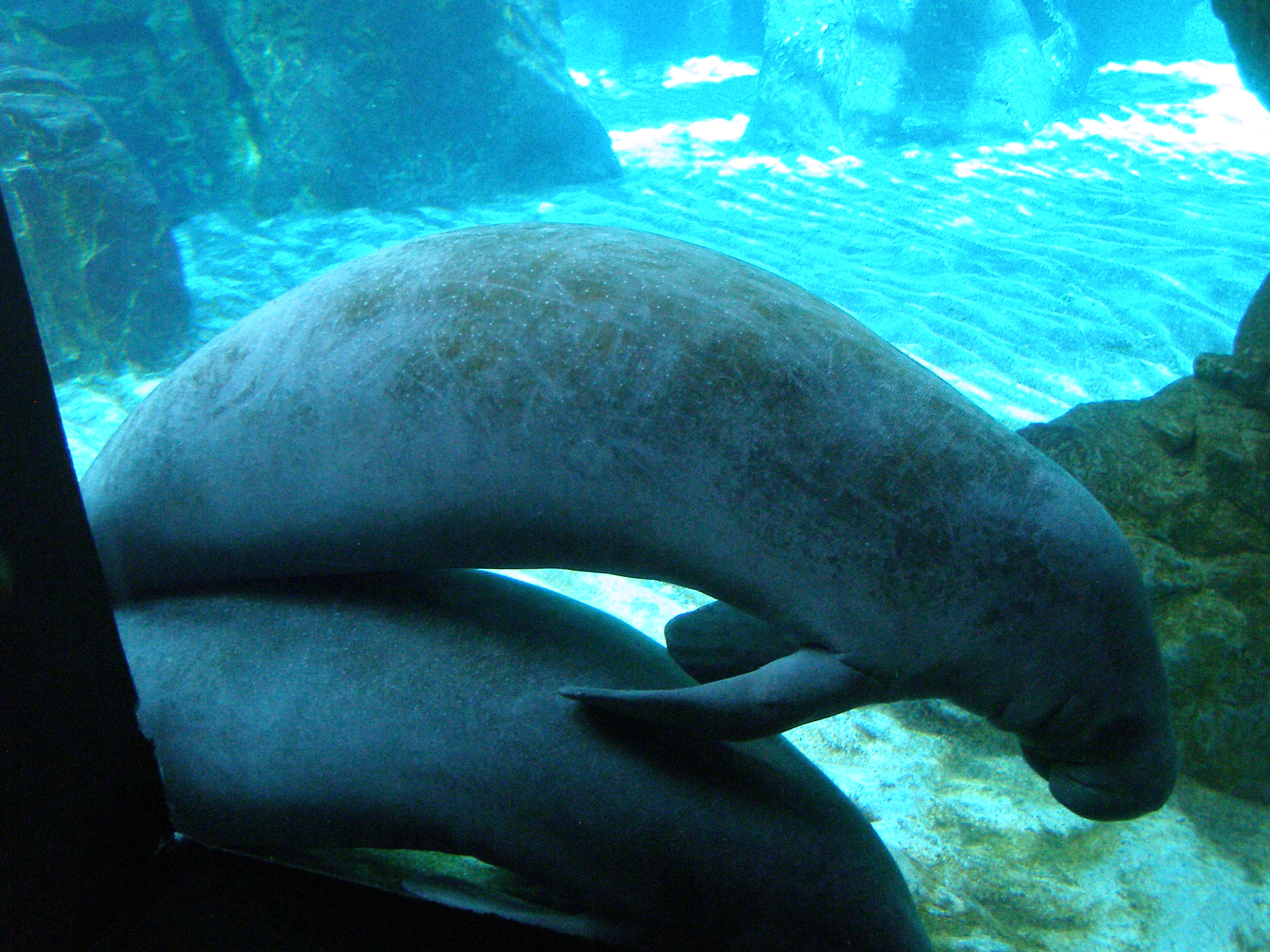

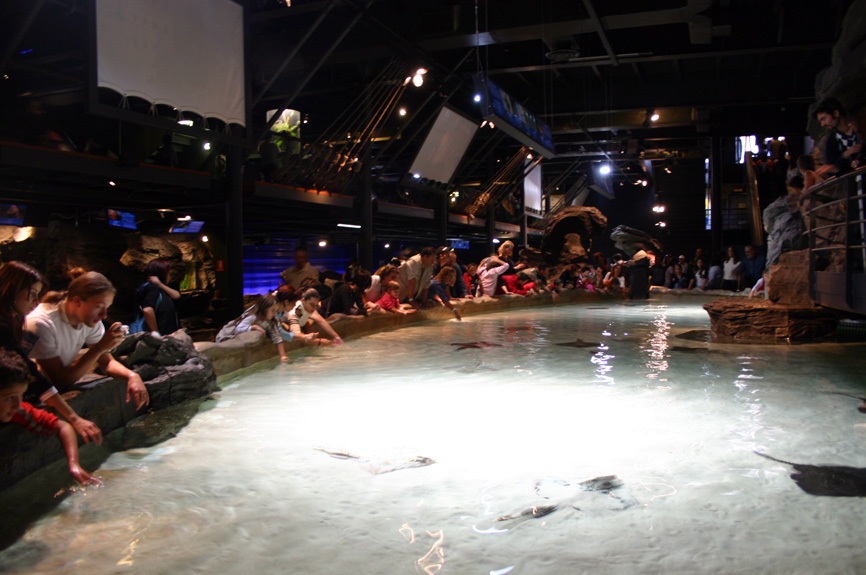

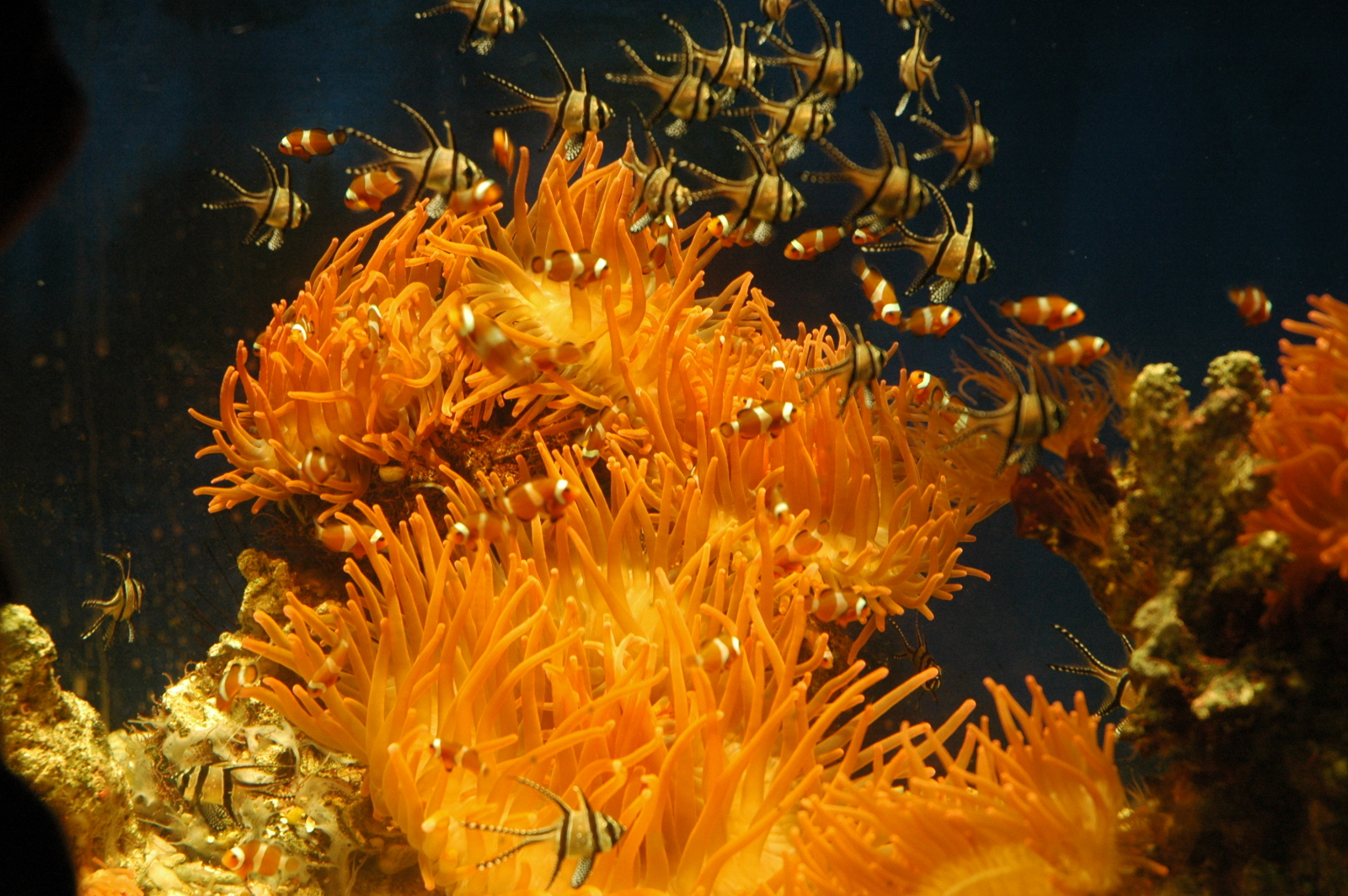

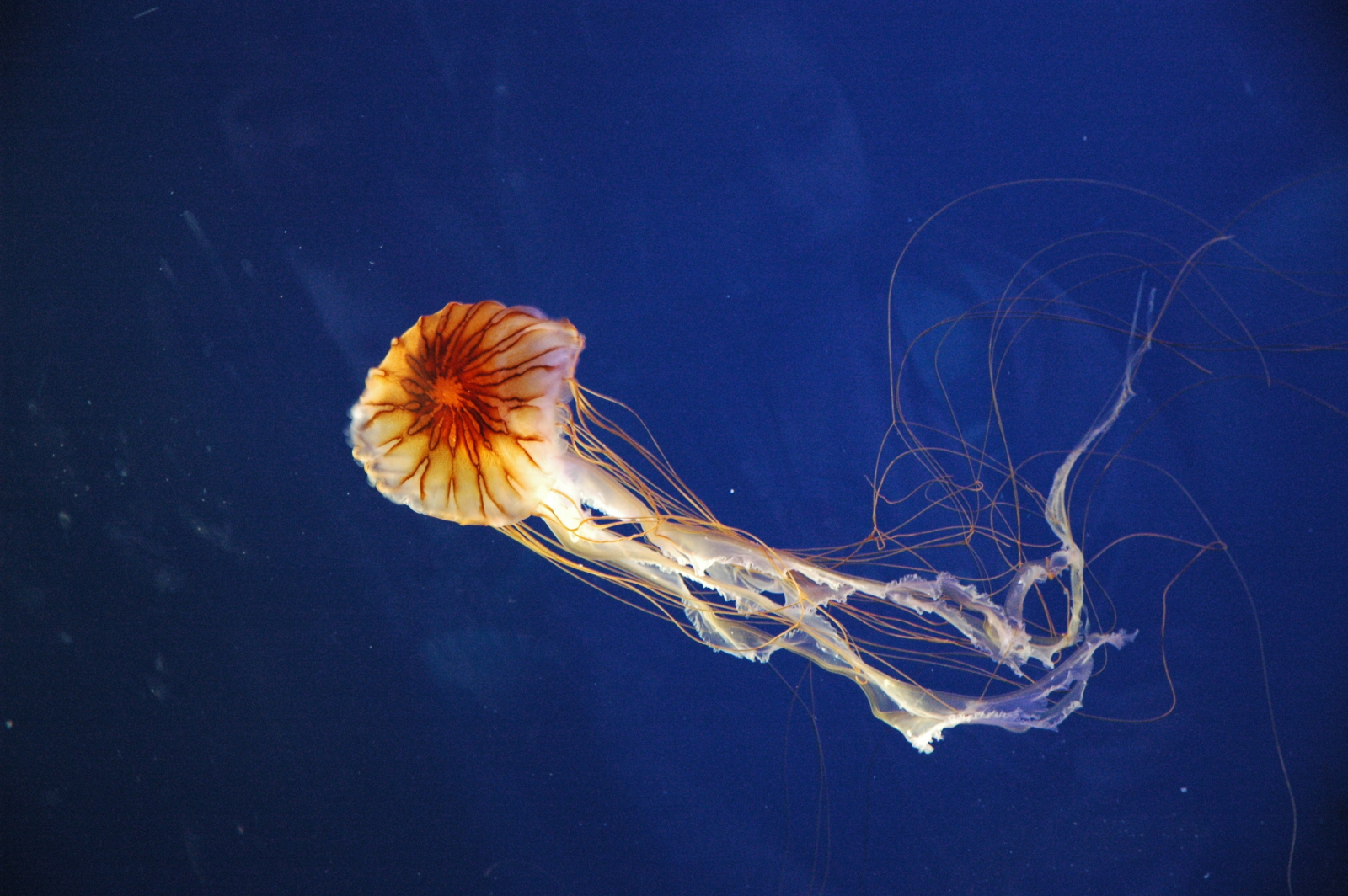

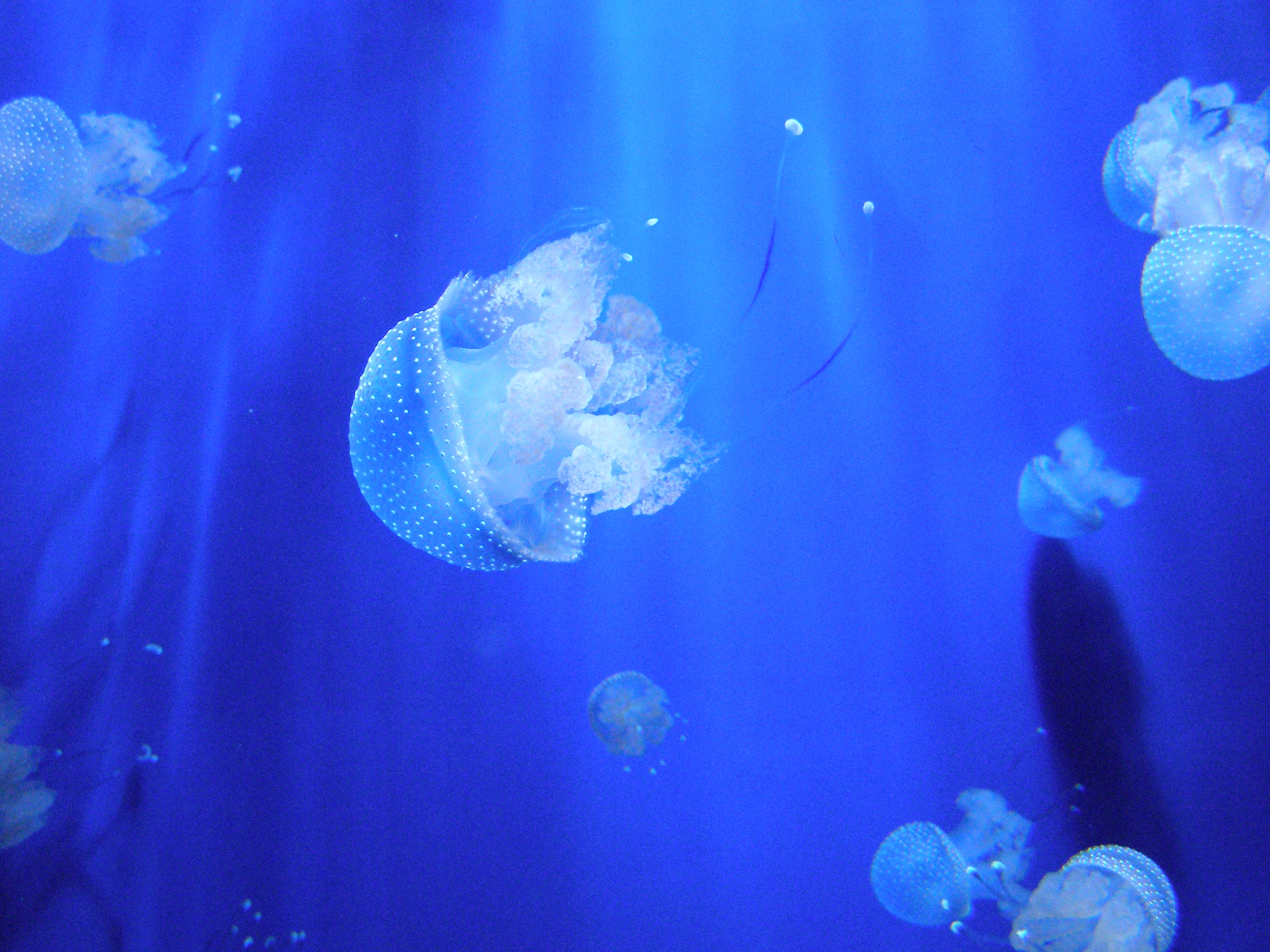

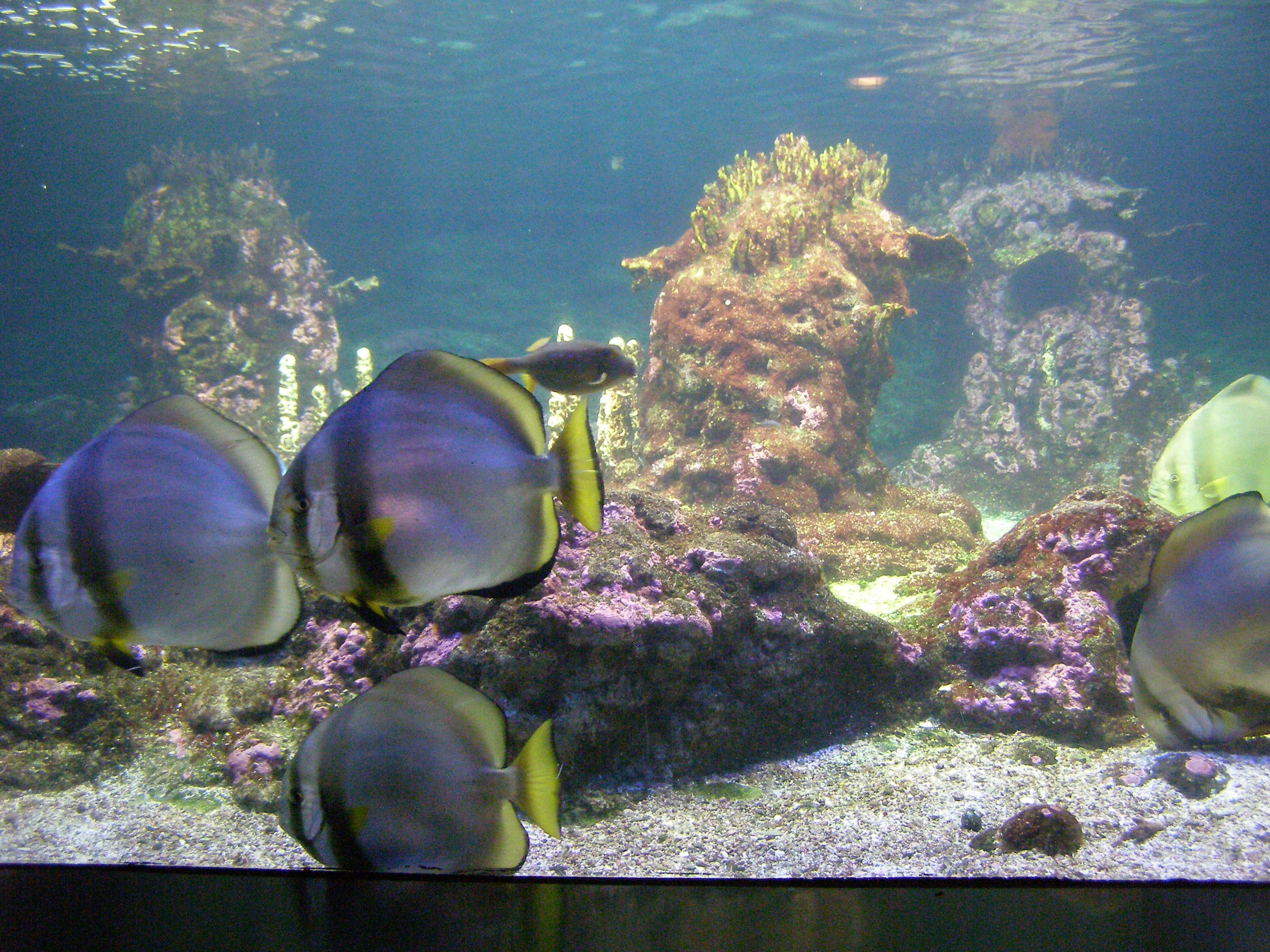

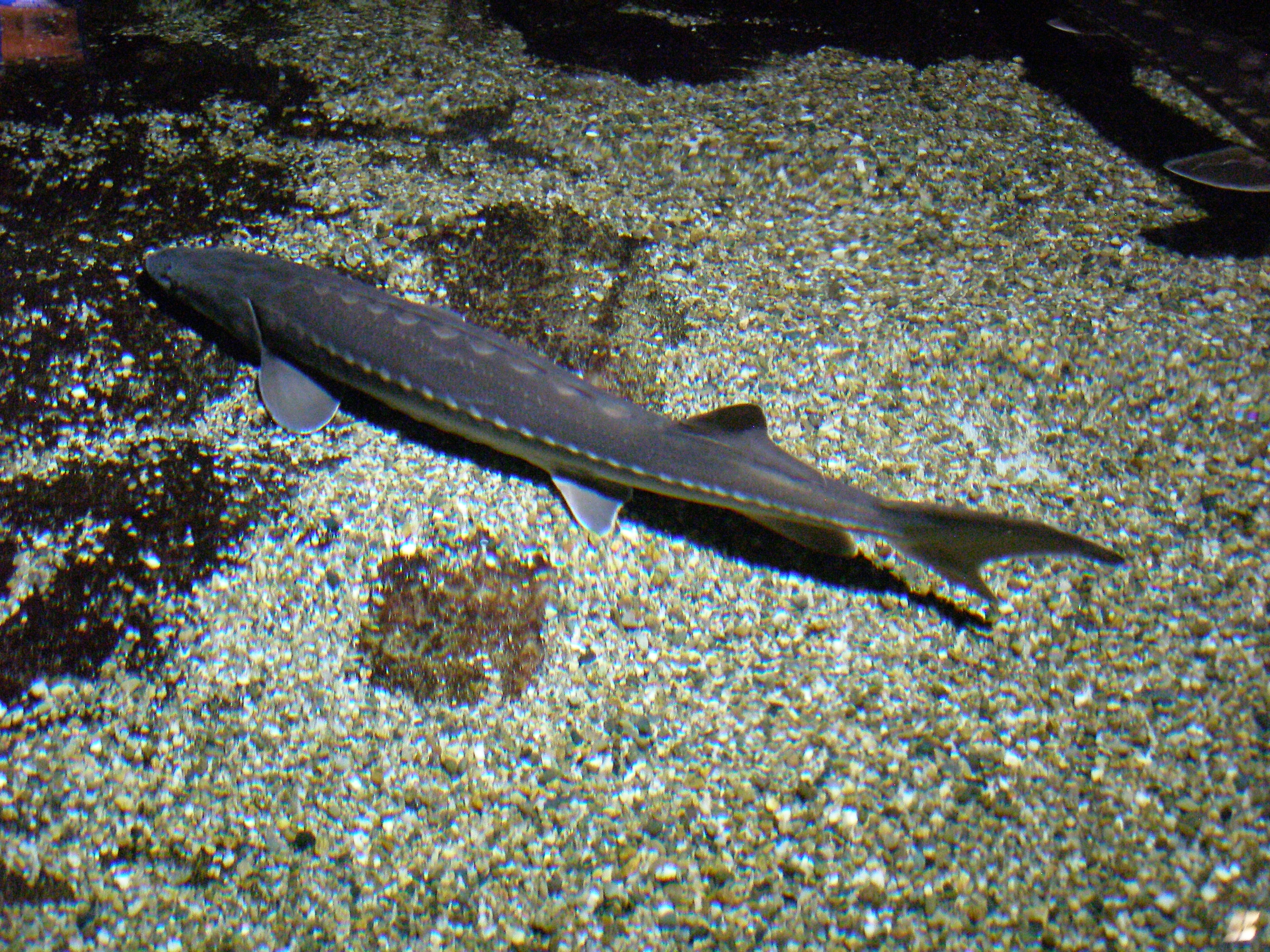

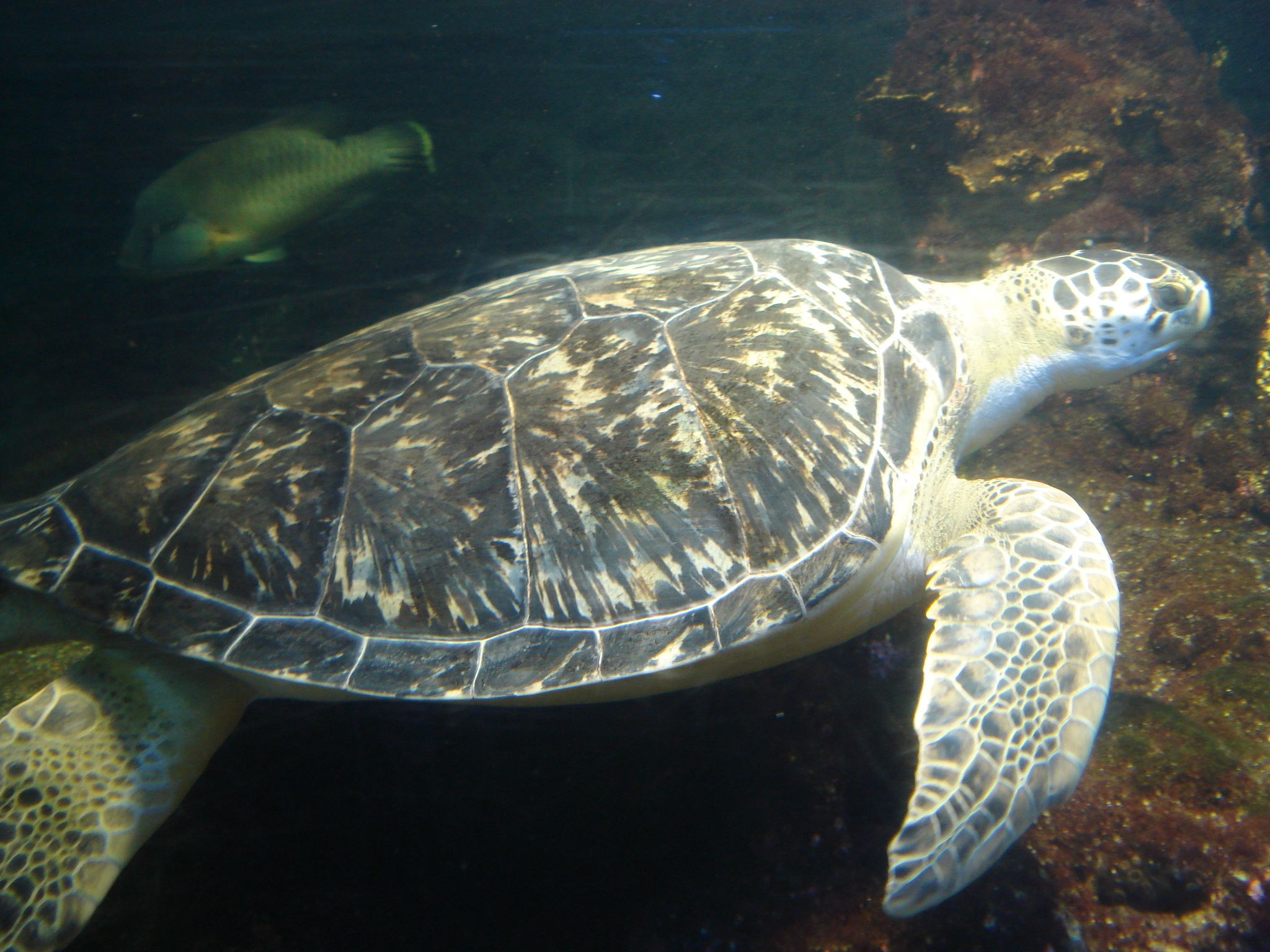

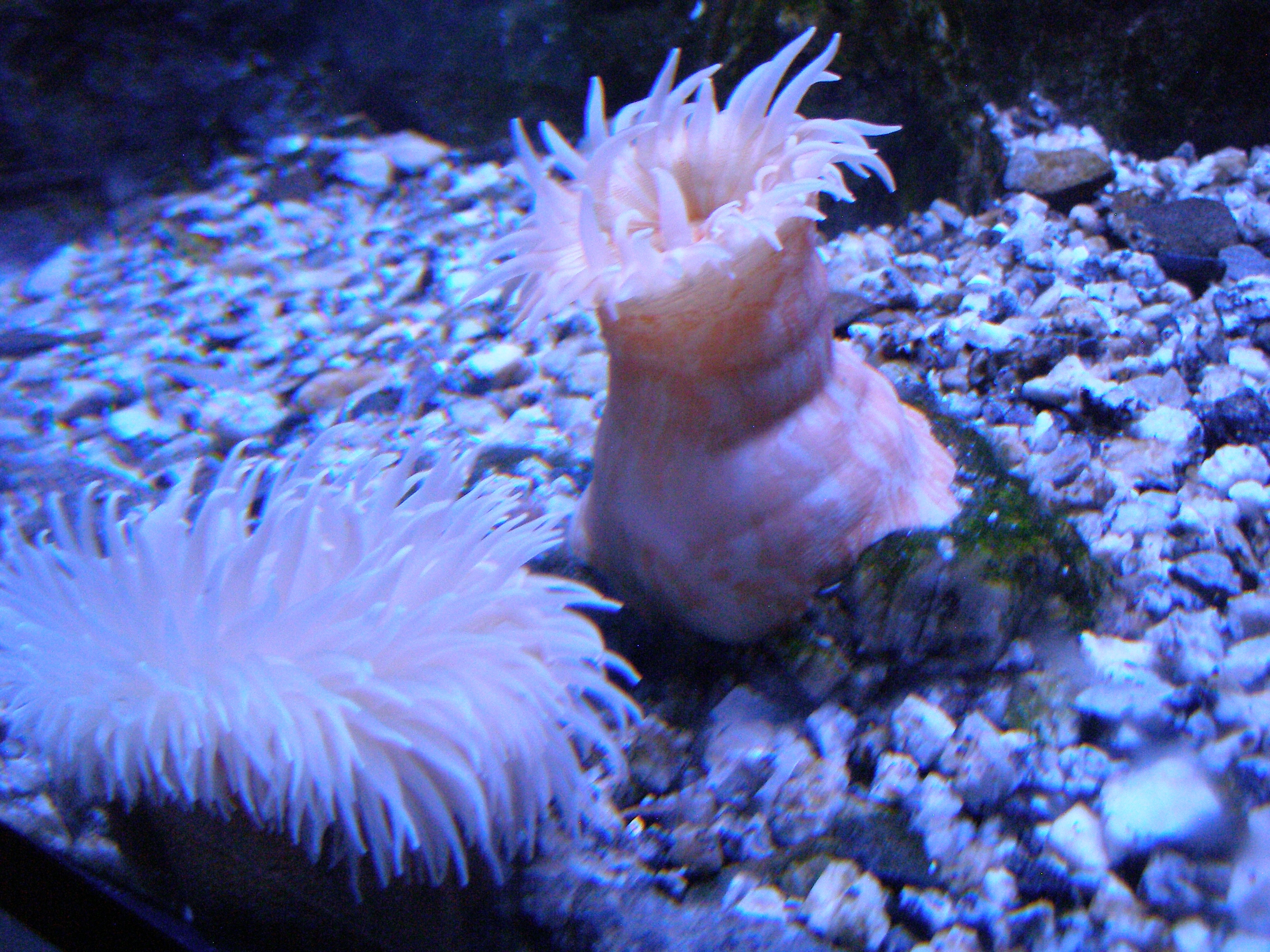

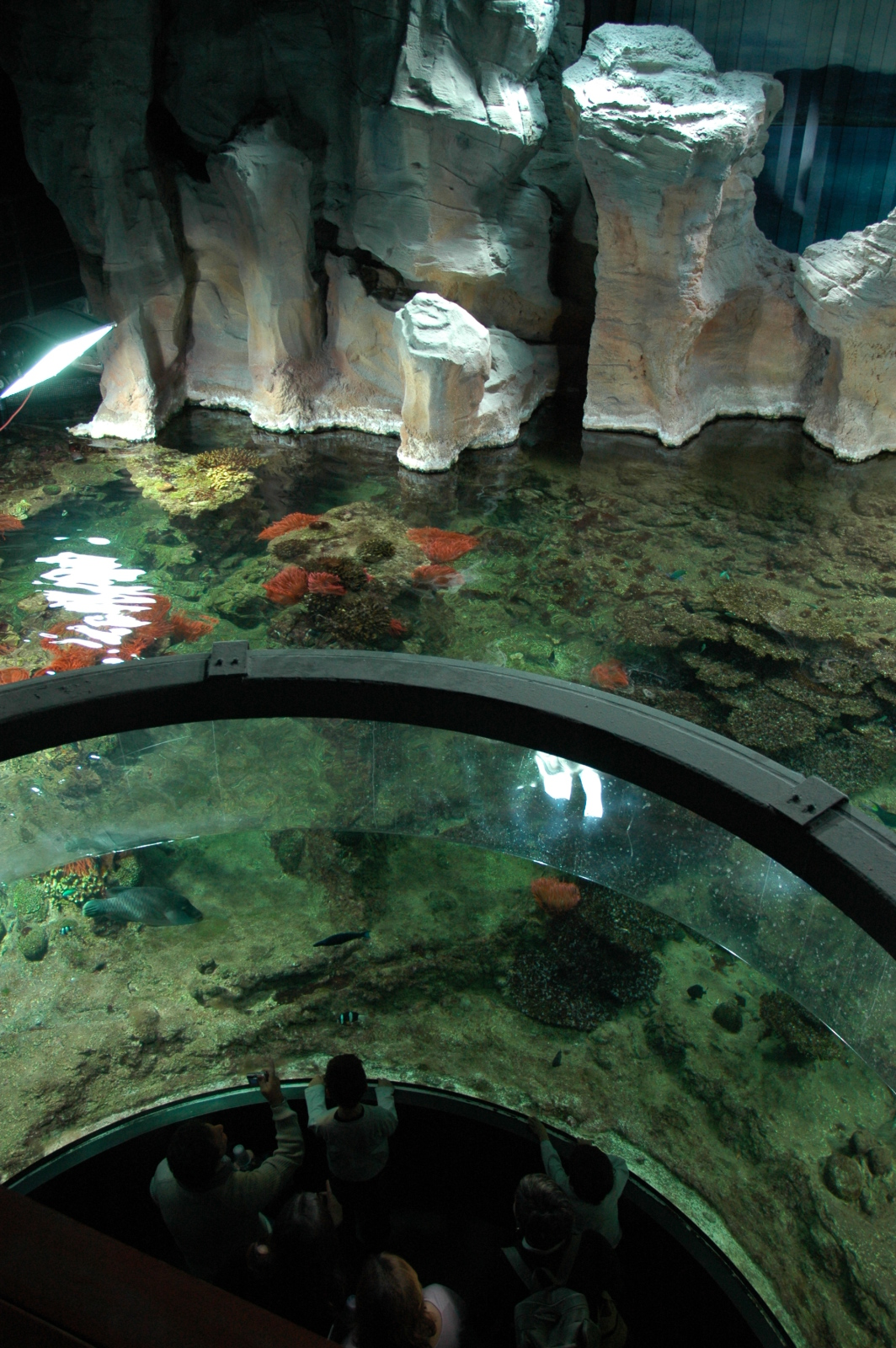

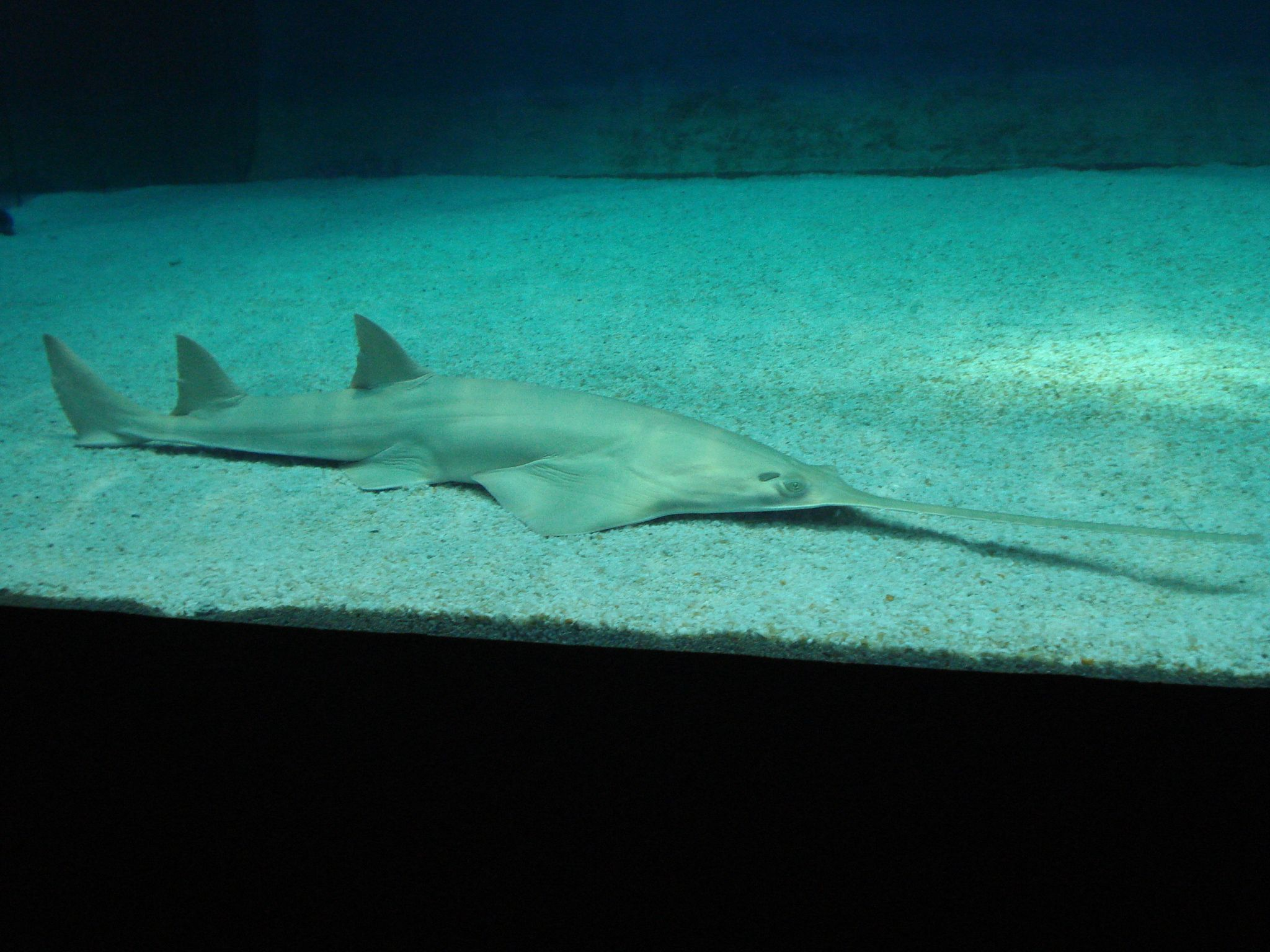

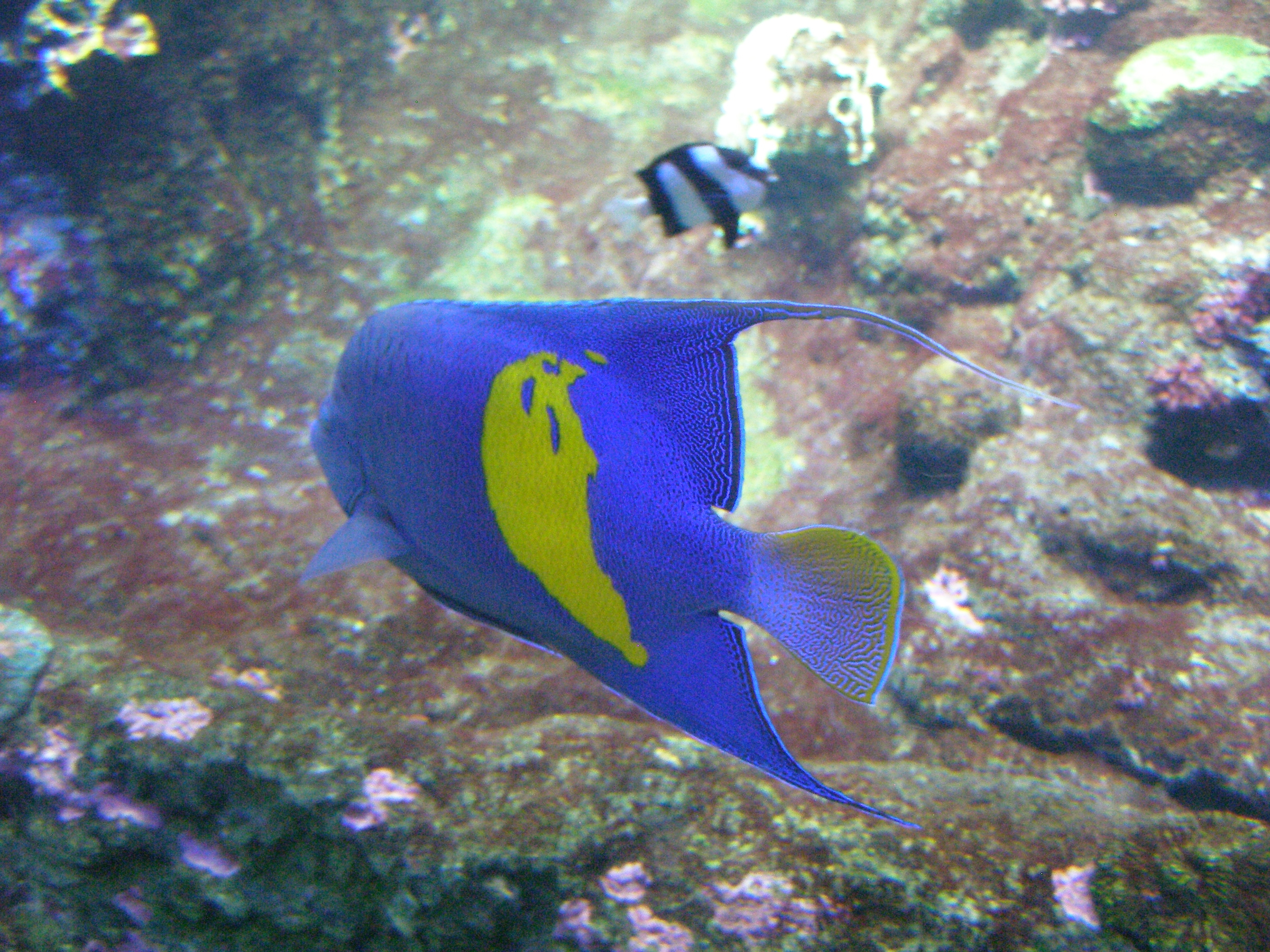

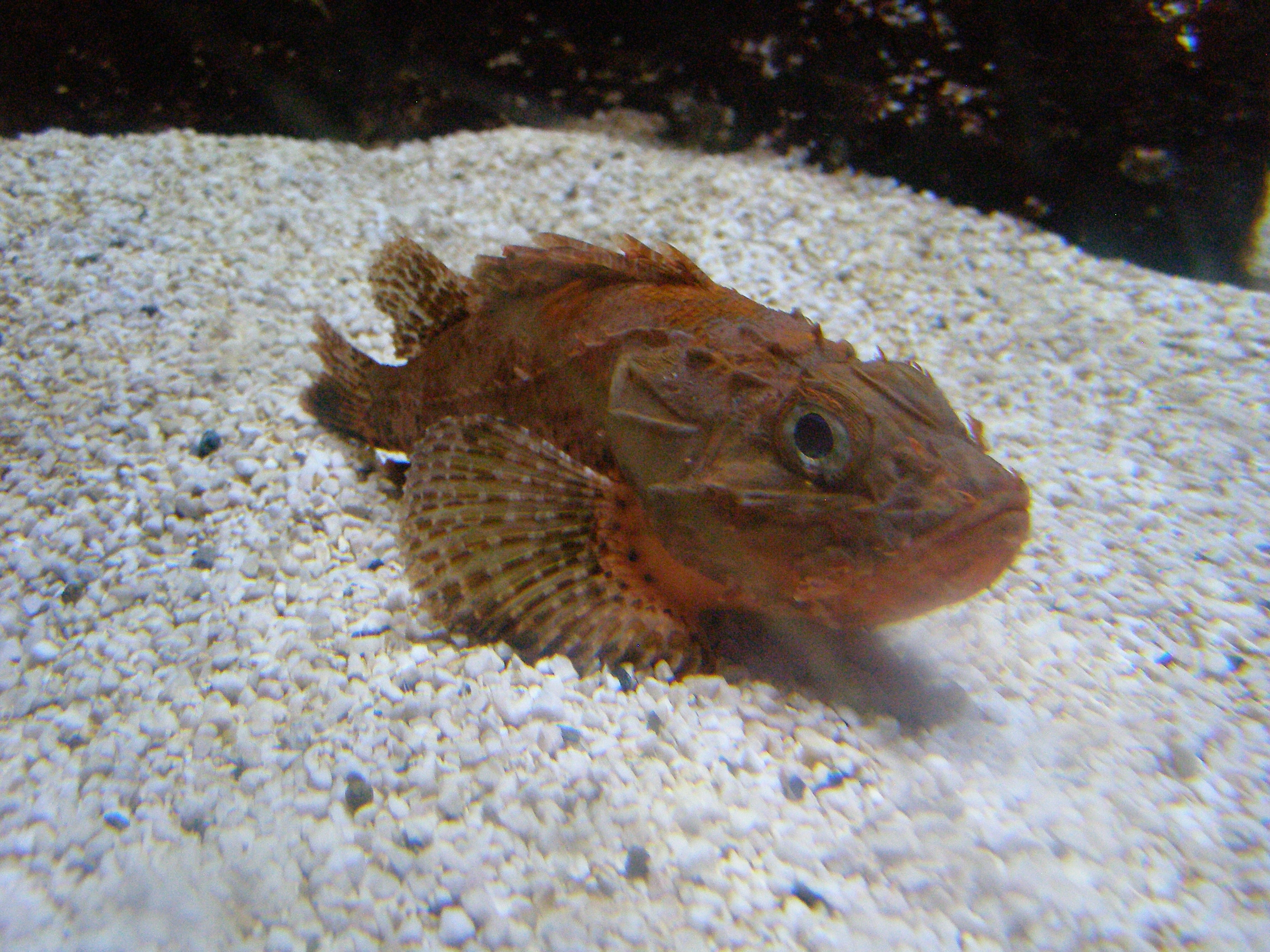
