= Costantino Nivola =

Italian sculptor

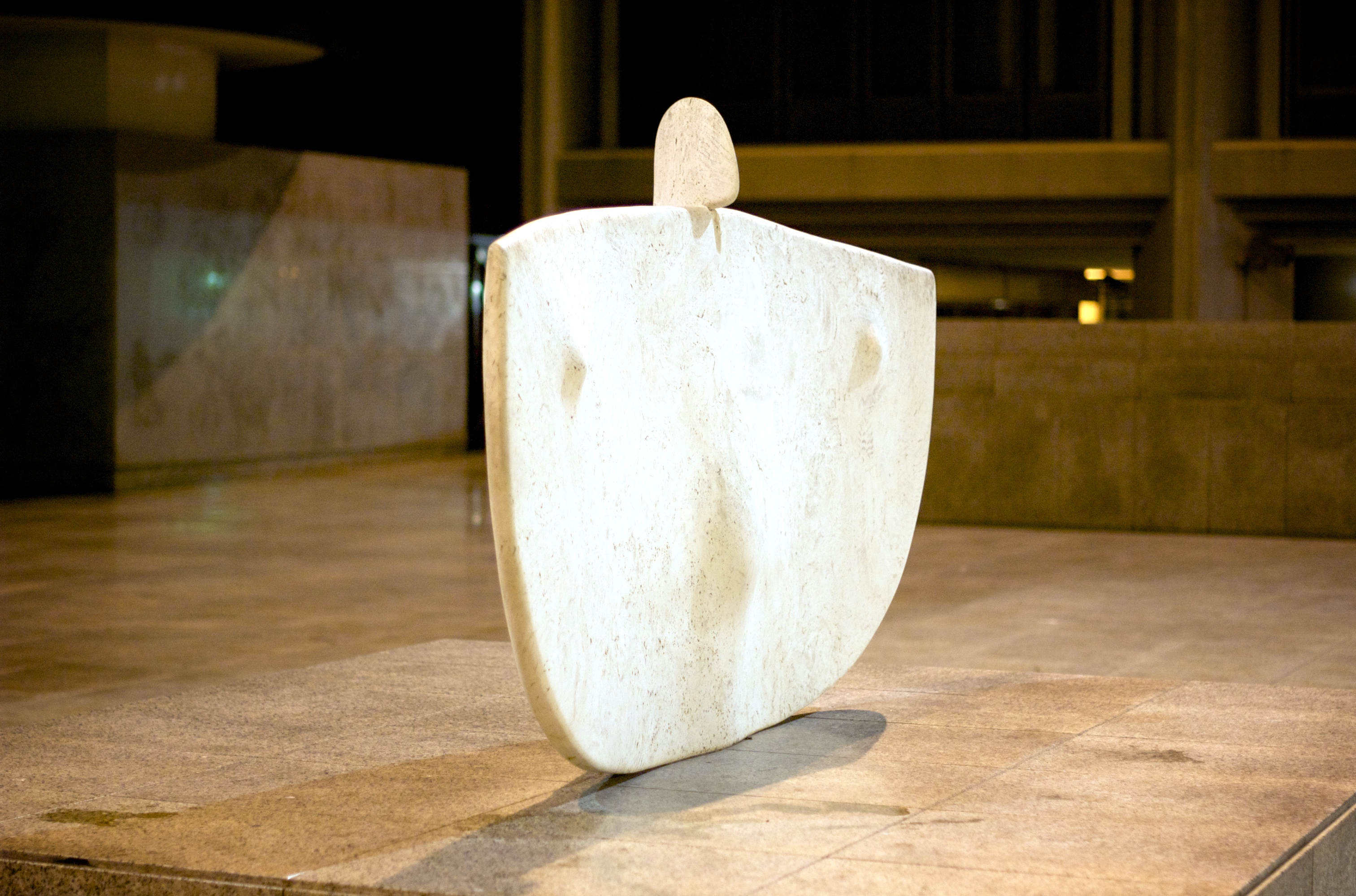
Costantino Nivola, Figura Femminile (Madre) Marmo, 1987, at the Palazzo del Consiglio Regionale, Cagliari

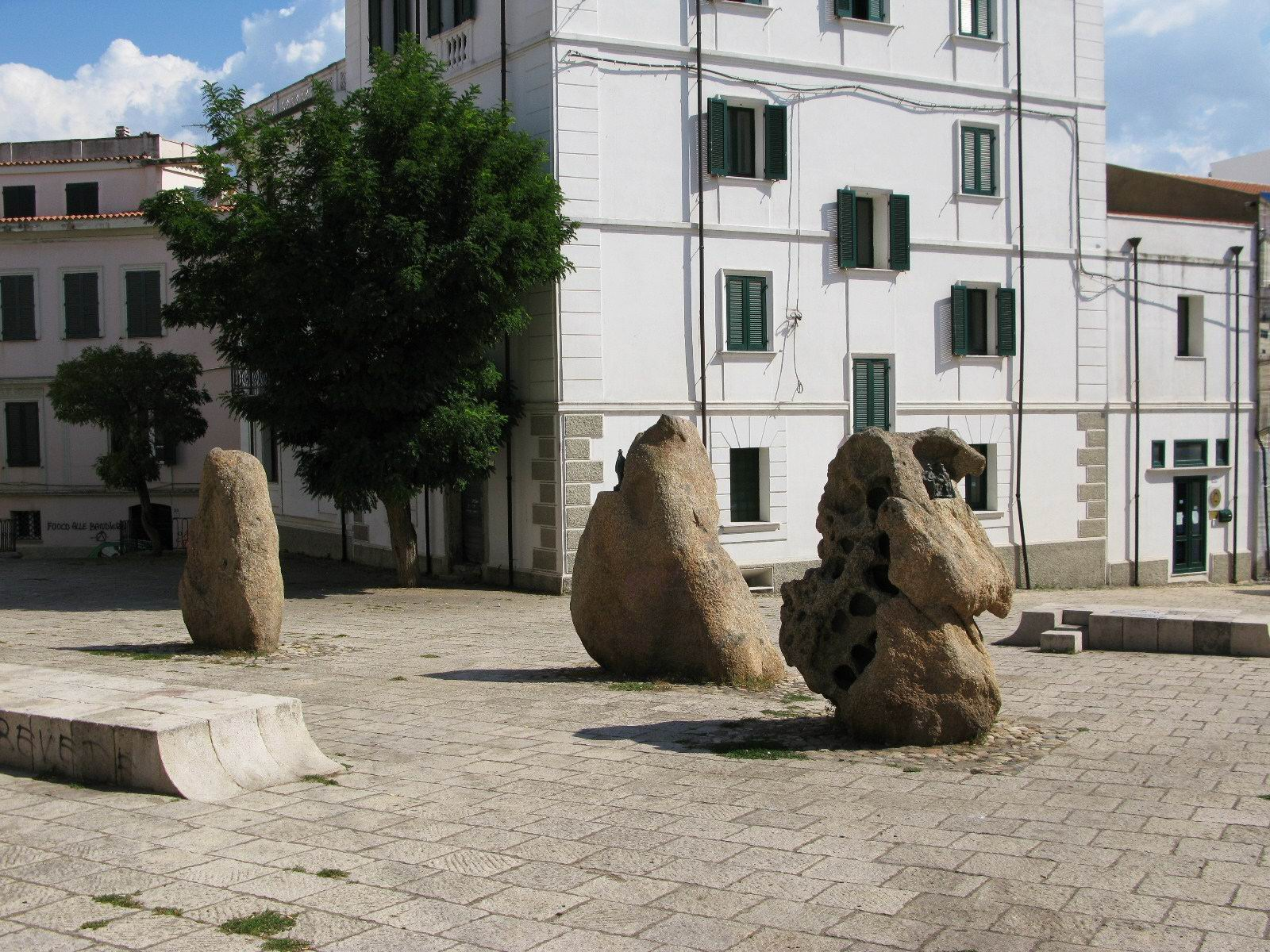
A series of sculptures located in Piazza Satta in Nuoro (1967)

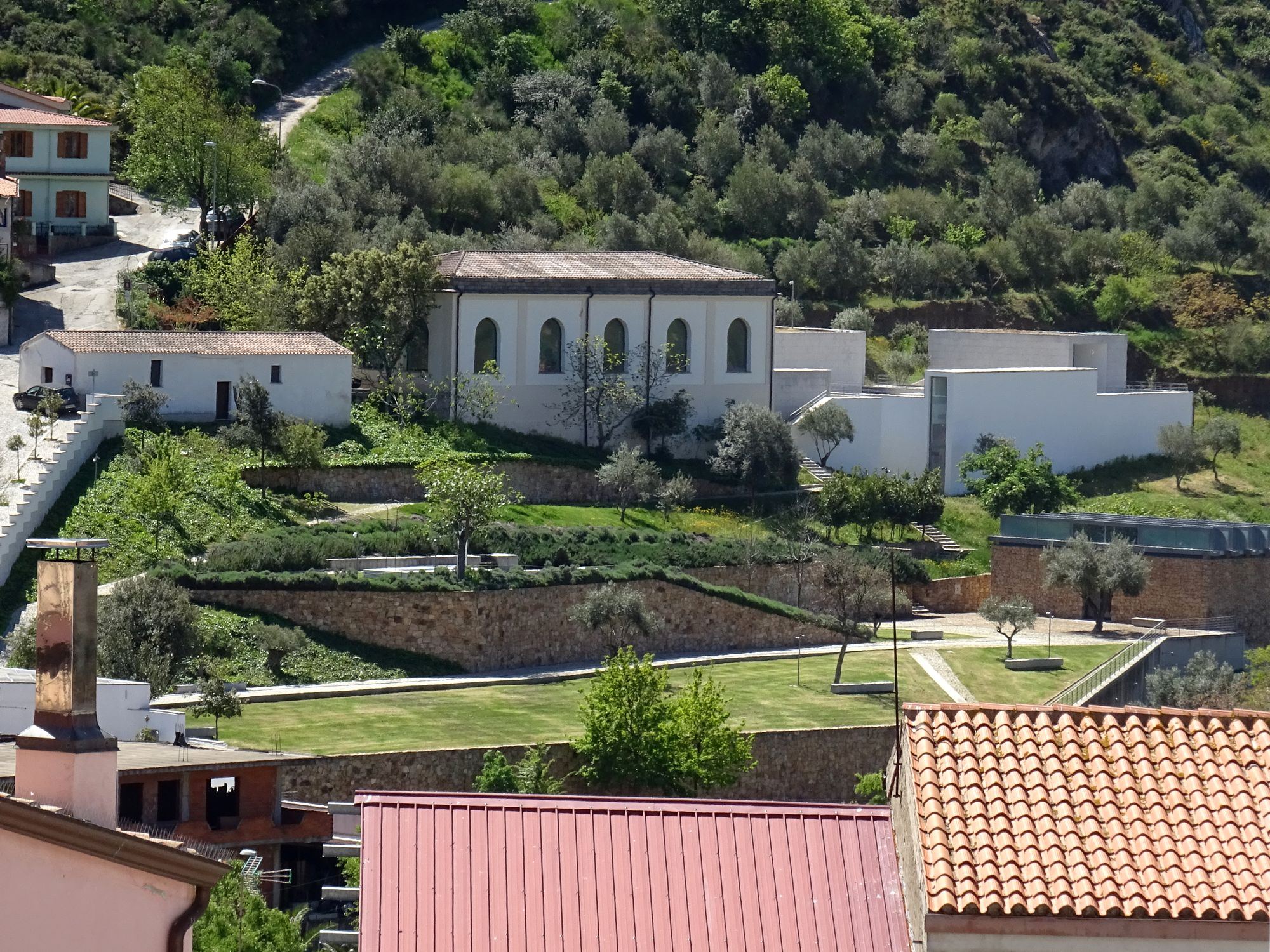
The Nivola Museum in Orani (Sardinia), view of the park

Costantino (also known as Antine, in Sardinia, or Tino, in the US) Nivola (July 5, 1911 – May 6, 1988) was an Italian sculptor, architectural sculptor, muralist, designer, and teacher.

Born in Orani, a town in the region of Sardinia, Nivola had already started his career when he fled Fascism for Paris in 1938, going to the U.S. in 1939. His major sculptural work is abstract, large-scale architectural reliefs in concrete, made in his own sandcasting and cement carving processes. These were erected in and on American buildings between the late 1950s and early 1970s. Creatively busy and while remaining active in Italy, Nivola also taught at the Harvard Graduate School of Design, Columbia University, UC Berkeley, and elsewhere.

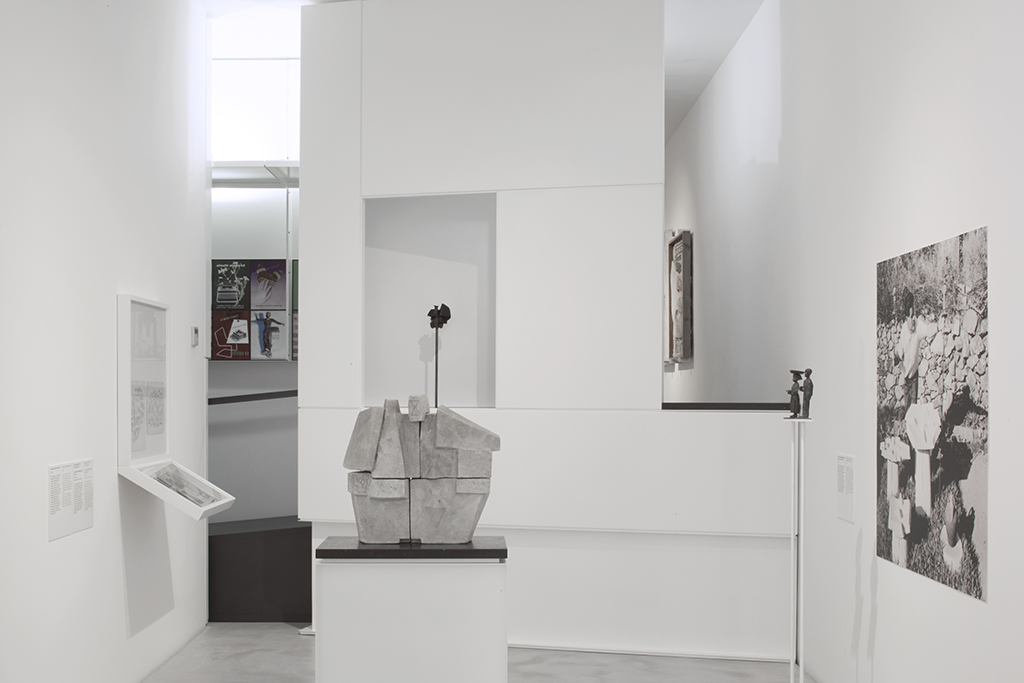
Nivola Museum (ph. Armin Linke)

The Nivola Museum in Orani, Sardinia is dedicated to his life and sculpture, and hosts the largest collection of his smaller scale work.

== Early career ==
Nivola was born and grew up poor in Orani, a village in Sardinia. As an adolescent, he worked as an apprentice stonemason. In Sassari in 1926, Nivola served as apprentice to fellow painter Mario Delitala, executing frescoes for the aula magna of the local university.

In 1931 Nivola enrolled in the ISIA (Istituto superiore per le industrie artistiche, the State Institute of Industrial Arts) in Monza. Through one of his teachers, the architect Giuseppe Pagano, he contributed work to the 1936 Milan Triennial VI and the Italian Pavilion at the 1937 Paris Exposition. This drew the attention of Adriano Olivetti, who named him art director of his company's Publicity Department, where Nivola "made a significant contribution to... 'the Olivetti style'".

== United States ==
Nivola married fellow ISIA student Ruth Guggenheim in 1938, and left together for the United States via Paris in 1939. He established a home in Greenwich Village (first at Waverly Place, then at No. 47 West Eighth Street) to rebuild a social circle and a career despite speaking no English.

Nivola resumed a close friendship with artist Saul Steinberg from Milan, attended meetings of the anti-fascist Italian-American Mazzini Society in 1941, and by the 1940s Nivola was presiding over a weekly gathering of artists at Del Pezzo's restaurant described by Peter Blake as comparable to the Algonquin Round Table. One key friendship was Le Corbusier. Introduced in 1945 by Josep Lluís Sert, Nivola became warm lifelong friends with the Swiss architect, his houseguest on Corbu's rare trips to America.

Supported by small exhibitions and a progression of jobs in factories, for Bonwit Teller, and for architectural magazines, the Nivolas bought a modest property in Springs, East Hampton, Long Island. It would expand to 35 acres. Their garden landscape, a series of outdoor rooms and a roofless solarium, was co-designed by the Nivolas and architect Bernard Rudofsky; in 1950 Le Corbusier impulsively painted murals on two walls of their kitchen. On the nearby beach Nivola developed the principle of his distinctive concrete sandcasting technique while playing with his children. They sculpted wet sand, then poured a slurry of plaster or concrete into the form.

In 1951 Nivola was one of the artists shown in the pivotal 9th Street Art Exhibition, hung by Leo Castelli.

Once more Olivetti provided the sculptor with a major commission, for an interior wall in their stylish Fifth Avenue showroom in 1953. Nivola executed it with a refined, scaled-up version of the beach process, in a sequence of panels. The resulting attention and publicity started a successful career in large-scale architecture work which lasted for decades. One project, involving two thousand and ten cast-concrete panels for the McCormick Place Exposition Center in Chicago in 1959, was touted as the largest such installation ever.

In 1954 Nivola was appointed director of the Design Workshop at the Harvard Graduate School of Design, where he served until 1957. He was also visiting professor or artist in residence at Columbia University (1961), Harvard (1970 and 1973), Dartmouth (1978), UC Berkeley (1978–79 and 1982), and the Royal Academy of Art, The Hague (1982). The American Institute of Graphic Arts awarded him its Certificate of Excellence. In 1972 the American Academy of Arts and Letters admitted Nivola as its first non-American member.

Nivola died of a heart attack in Southampton Hospital, Long Island, in May 1988. He was the father of children's book author Claire Nivola, and the grandfather of actor Alessandro Nivola. A foundation and museum dedicated to Nivola's work opened in his hometown in 1995, in a building partly designed by architect Peter Chermayeff.

== Work ==
The Sardinian town of Ulassai decided, in the early 1980s, to rehabilitate its neglected municipal laundry building dating from 1903. It was turned into an open-air contemporary museum with a number of artists represented – Maria Lai, Luigi Veronesi, Guido Strazza. Nivola's contribution, a sculptural sound fountain, was completed in 1987 as his final work.

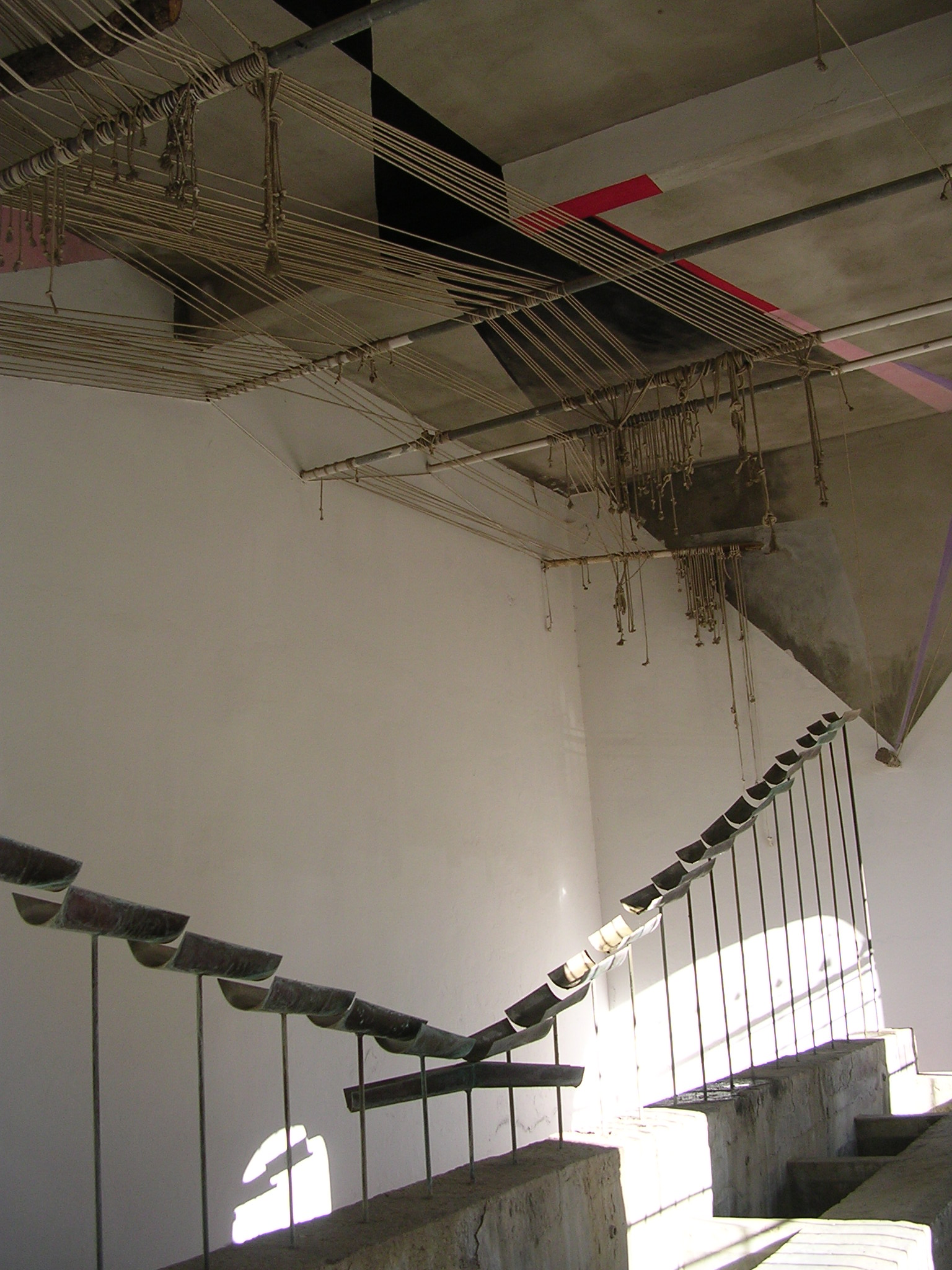
sound fountain, Ulassai Municipal Laundry Building

Nivola's public work includes:

- sgraffito exterior mural wall, Gagarin House I, Litchfield, Connecticut, with architect Marcel Breuer, 1952
- interior sand-cast relief wall, Olivetti showroom, Fifth Avenue, New York City, with architects BBPR, 1953 (razed)
- exterior panel for the William E. Grady CTE High School, Brooklyn, New York, 1957
- Untitled, an interior cast-concrete mural of 132 panels in the former Mutual Insurance Company of Hartford (later Covenant Mutual Insurance Company), 95 Woodland Street, Hartford, Connecticut, with Sherwood, Mills & Smith, architects, 1957
- over 2000 cast-concrete panels for the exterior of McCormick Place Exposition Center, Chicago, for Shaw, Metz & Associates, 1959 (destroyed 1967)
- Untitled, a cast-concrete abstract exterior wall for the Mutual Insurance Company of Hartford, with Sherwood, Mills & Smith, architects, 1960
- 18 polychrome cast stone horses and an 80-foot sgraffito mural wall, for the Stephen Wise Towers housing development play area, with architect Richard G. Stein for the New York City Housing Authority, 1964
- 20 concrete panels for the Connecticut Post Building, Bridgeport, Connecticut, 1966
- monument to poet Sebastiano Satta, Nuoro, Sardinia, 1966
- Family of Man, two cast-concrete abstract bas-reliefs with forms suggesting family groupings, entry to the Van Pelt Library, University of Pennsylvania, Harbeson, Hough, Livingston & Larson architects. Building, 1962; sculpture, 1969
- Dedicated to the American Secretary, 14 abstract panels of sand-cast steel-reinforced concrete in the lobby, with a companion free-standing figure in the courtyard, Continental Bank, 400 Market Street, Philadelphia, Pennsylvania, 1970
- 33 sculpted panels on the history of communications theme, Janesville Gazette Building, Janesville, Wisconsin, 1970
- work at the Palazzo del Consiglio Regionale (House of the Regional Council), Cagliari, with architect Mario Fiorentino, 1987

== Books ==
- G. Altea e A. Camarda, “Formal Autonomy versus Public Participation: The Modernist Monument in Costantino Nivola’s work”, in I. Ben-Asher Gitler (ed.), Monuments, Site-Specific Sculpture and Urban Space, Cambridge Scholars Publishing, 2017, pp. 134–162
- G. Altea and A. Camarda, Costantino Nivola. La sintesi delle arti, Ilisso, 2015
- A. Mereu, Il Nivola ritrovato. Un artista tra l’America e il Mugello, Firenze, Nardini editore, 2012.
- Renato Miracco (ed.), Costantino Nivola. 100 Years of Creativity, Milano, Charta, 2012.
- Maddalena Mameli, Le Corbusier e Costantino Nivola. New York 1946–1953, Franco Angeli, Milano 2012.
- G. Altea (a cura di), Seguo la traccia nera e sottile. I disegni di Costantino Nivola, Agave, Sassari 2011.
- Nivola. L’investigazione dello spazio, ed. by C. Pirovano, Nuoro, Ilisso, 2010.
- G. Altea, Costantino Nivola, Ilisso, Nuoro 2004.
- U. Collu et al., Museo Nivola, Nuoro, Ilisso, 2004.
- S. Forrestier, Nivola Terrecotte. Opere dello studio Nivola, Amagansett, USA, Milano, Jaca Book, 2004.
- R. Cassanelli, U. Collu, O.Selvafolta (eds), Nivola Fancello Pintori. Percorsi del moderno, Jaca Book, Milano 2003.
- Costantino Nivola in Springs, ed. by M. Martegani, New York-Nuoro, The Parrish Art Museum-Ilisso, 2003.
- Nivola, Fancello, Pintori. Percorsi del moderno, eds R. Cassanelli, U. Collu, O. Selvafolta, Milano, Jaca Book, 2003.
- Nivola. Biografia per immagini, with texts by R. Venturi, D. Ashton and D. Mormorio, Nuoro, Ilisso, 2001
- Marika Herskovic, New York School Abstract Expressionists Artists Choice by Artists, (New York School Press, 2000.) ISBN 0-9677994-0-6. p. 18; p. 38; p. 266–269.
- Costantino Nivola. Sculture dipinti disegni, a cura di L. Caramel, C. Pirovano, Milano, Electa, 1999.
- A. Crespi, F. Licht, S. Naitza, Nivola. Dipinti e grafica, Milano, Jaca Book, 1995.
- U. Collu et al., Nivola dipinti e grafica, Milano, Jaca Book, 1995.
- Museo Nivola, Nuoro, Ilisso, 1995.
- S. Naitza (ed. by), Nivola, Nuoro, Ilisso, 1994.
- F. Licht, A. Satta, R. Ingersoll, Nivola: sculture, Milano, Jaca Book, 1991.
- R. Bossaglia, P. Cherchi, Nivola, Nuoro, Ilisso, 1990.
- Onnis, Omar; Mureddu, Manuelle (2019). Illustres. Vita, morte e miracoli di quaranta personalità sarde (in Italian). Sestu: Domus de Janas. ISBN 978-88-97084-90-7. OCLC 1124656644.
