= Peter Chermayeff =

Architectural firm in Massachusetts, USA

Peter Chermayeff LLC
- Industry: Architecture
- Headquarters: Andover, Massachusetts, United States
- Key people: Peter Chermayeff; Bobby Poole
- Website: www.peterchermayeff.com

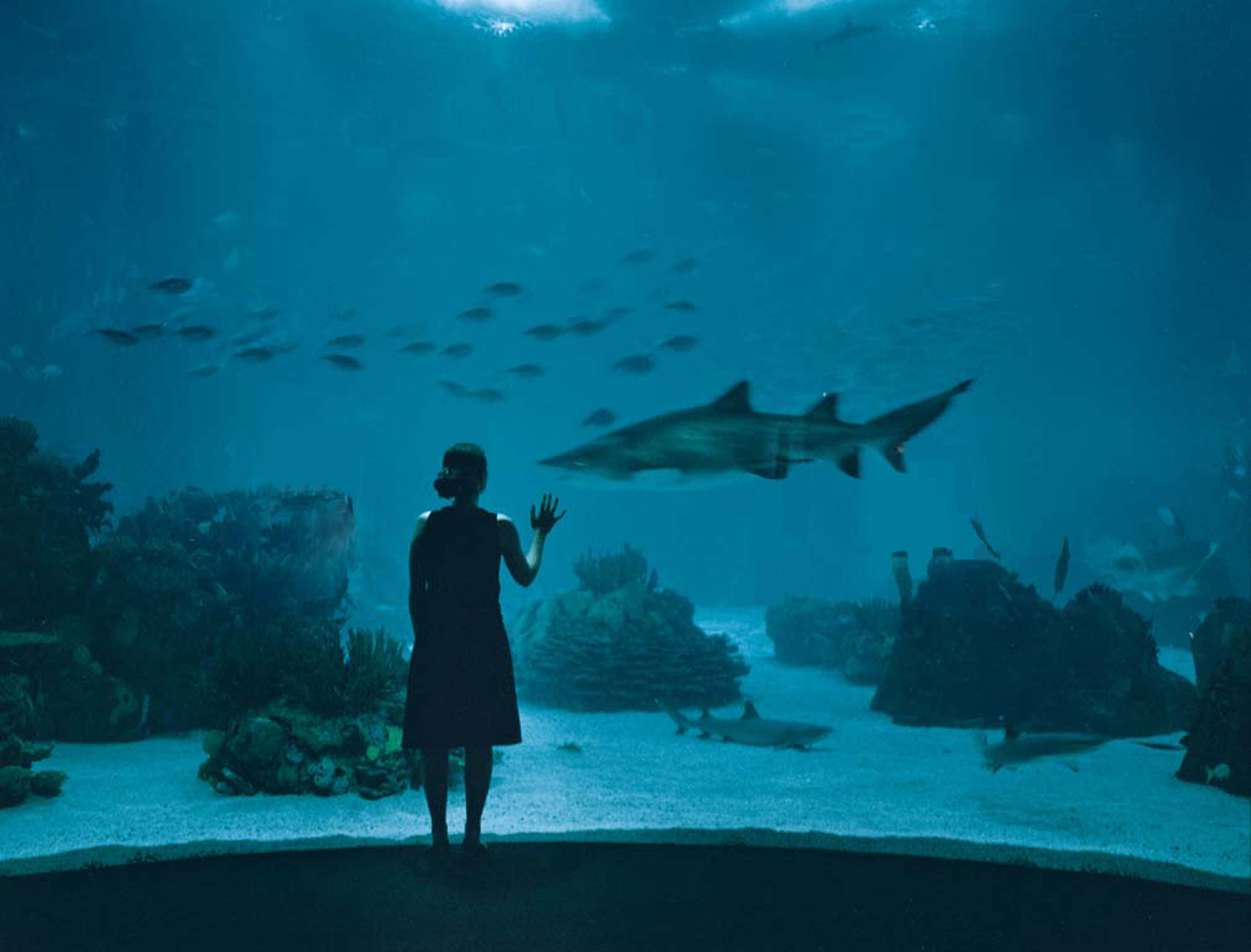
Lisbon Oceanarium

Peter Chermayeff LLC is a Massachusetts-based architectural firm which specializes in aquarium architecture and exhibit design, from conceptual planning to the details of final realization.

== History ==
The two principals, Peter Chermayeff, son of architect Serge Chermayeff, and Bobby C. Poole, have collaborated on the design of public aquariums since 1975. Their long partnership, with focus on the design of public aquariums, began in 1975 when Bobby Poole joined Cambridge Seven Associates (C7A), which had been founded in 1962 by Peter Chermayeff together with Louis Bakanowsky, Ivan Chermayeff, Alden Christie, Paul Dietrich, Tom Geismar, and Terry Rankine. The firm's first major commission was the New England Aquarium, which opened in 1969. Peter Chermayeff was the principal in charge and he himself put each fish, including a sand tiger shark, in its main four-story 40-foot-wide Giant Ocean Tank containing 200 thousand gallons of salt water.

Peter Chermayeff played a leading role in much of the design work through the first thirty-six years of Cambridge Seven Associates, including comprehensive design guidelines for Boston's mass transit system, the MBTA, and its simplified identity at "The T"; the United States Pavilion and Exhibition at Expo '67; the National Aquarium in Baltimore; the San Antonio Museum of Art; Charles Square, a hotel, retail, housing and office complex in Cambridge, Massachusetts; “Where's Boston?”, a mixed media celebration and portrait of Boston for the United States Bicentennial; the Osaka Aquarium; the Tennessee Aquarium in Chattanooga; and the Aquarium of Genoa. These and other projects led to C7A receiving the Architecture Firm of the Year award in 1993 from the AIA.

Bobby Poole joined C7A in 1976 to work with Peter Chermayeff on the National Aquarium in Baltimore. Poole became the aquarium's project architect, leading preparation of final design documents and on-site overview of construction and installation. He became a principal in 1986 and further developed his interest in aquariums working with Peter Chermayeff on the Osaka Aquarium, the Tennessee Aquarium, the Aquarium of Genoa, the Lisbon Oceanarium, and the Alaska SeaLife Center in Seward, Alaska. They also collaborated on unbuilt aquariums and rainforest pavilions proposed by Chermayeff while at C7A for Moscow, Russia, for Hamburg, Bremerhaven and Oberhausen in Germany, and for Tsuruhama, Osaka, in Japan.

Peter Chermayeff and Bobby Poole continued their close collaboration until 2005 with Peter Sollogub under the firm name Chermayeff, Sollogub and Poole, Inc., until 2009 under the firm name Chermayeff & Poole, Inc., and since that year as Peter Chermayeff LLC. Recent completed projects have included the expansion of the National Aquarium in Baltimore, and the expansion of the Tennessee Aquarium in Chattanooga, both of which opened in 2005. Expansion of the Museo Nivola in Orani, Sardinia, a second component of a museum dedicated to the sculptor Costantino Nivola, was completed in 2005. The remodeling and expansion of the Virginia Aquarium at Virginia Beach, Virginia, was completed in 2009.

Recent unbuilt projects have included a proposed Aquarium and Environmental Center for Alexandria, Egypt, the New Songdo Ecotarium in Incheon, near Seoul, South Korea, and the proposed remodeling and expansion of Nausicaä Centre National de la Mer in Boulogne-sur-Mer, France. A recent proposed Aquarium was to be the core attraction within the proposed Parco del Mare in Trieste, Italy. A current project is the expansion of the Lisbon Oceanarium.

== See also ==
- Osaka Aquarium Kaiyukan
- Lisbon Oceanarium
- Tennessee Aquarium
- Aquarium of Genoa
- National Aquarium in Baltimore
- New England Aquarium
- Serge Chermayeff
- Chermayeff & Geismar & Haviv

== Sources ==
- Time Magazine, “The Age of Aquariums”, by Daniel S. Levy, June 1, 1998 re Oceanarium of Lisbon"
- Harvard Magazine "Ocean in 1.5 Million Gallons or Less" by Jonathan Shaw, Jan-Feb, 1999"
- Video interview with SIC Noticias TV channel in Lisbon, Portugal, May 2009
- New York Times, “Underwater Theater for Briny Stars”, by Marlise Simons, 1998 re Lisbon Oceanarium
- The Baltimore Sun "A cube of glass and water" by Edward Gunts, August 12, 2001" re National Aquarium in Baltimore expansion
- Design for a Fair: The United States Pavilion at Expo '67 Montreal
