= Del Pezzo Restaurant =

Defunct restaurant in New York City, U.S.

- Interactive map of Del Pezzo Restaurant

Restaurant information
- Location: 33 West 47th Street, New York, New York, 10036, United States
- Coordinates: 40°45′27″N 73°58′49″W

Del Pezzo Restaurant was an eatery located at 211 West 34th Street (and later, on West 40th and West 47th) in New York City. It was frequented by singers connected with the Metropolitan Opera Company in the early 1930s. It was a favorite restaurant of Enrico Caruso; he and Giacomo Puccini dined there during the latter's visit to the United States in December 1906. They were joined by Marziale Sisca, the dean of Italian-American publishers, who owned the newspaper La Follia. The restaurant was also frequented by Life magazine staff members and by artists, such as the group that first met in 1950 to establish Raphael Soyer's Reality magazine. It was also the restaurant where Le Corbusier had lunch during his stay in New York for working the preliminary studies of the United Nations Headquarters, which were being prepared in a drafting room on the twenty-seventh floor of the RKO building.
