= CambridgeSeven =

American architecture firm

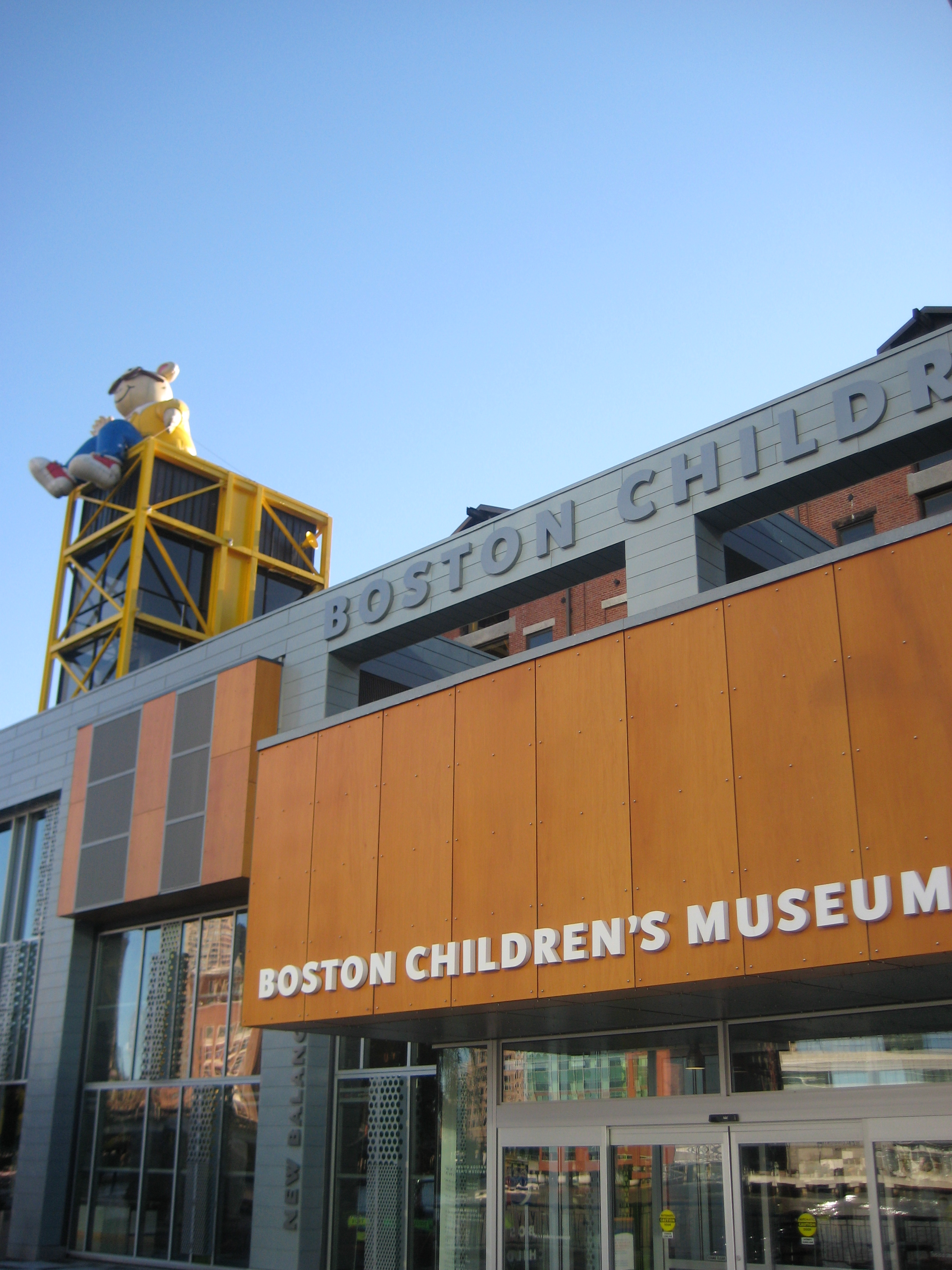
Boston Children's Museum with its 2007 addition

Cambridge Seven Associates, Inc., stylized as CambridgeSeven, and sometimes as C7A, is an American architecture firm based in Cambridge, Massachusetts. Buildings designed by the firm have included academic, museum, exhibit, hospitality, transportation, retail, office, and aquarium facilities, and have been built in North America, Europe, the Middle East, and Asia. Besides architecture, it operates in the areas of urban design, planning, exhibitions, graphic, and interior design.

The company was founded in 1962. The original seven partners were Lou Bakanowsky, Ivan Chermayeff, Peter Chermayeff, Alden Christie, Paul Dietrich, Tom Geismar, and Terry Rankine.

CambridgeSeven won the American Institute of Architects Architecture Firm Award in 1993, and was described by the AIA Committee on Design as "an influential and stimulating example, demonstrating new directions of professional practice."

In 2016, the company's revenue was $26 million.

== Notable projects ==
=== Academic ===
- College of Business, Kuwait University, Sabah Al-Salem University City, Kuwait
- College of Engineering and Petroleum, Kuwait University, Sabah Al-Salem University City, Kuwait
- College for Life Sciences, Kuwait University, Sabah Al-Salem University City, Kuwait
- Edwards Center for Art and Dance, Bowdoin College, Brunswick, Maine
- Health and Social Sciences Building, University of Massachusetts Lowell, Lowell, Massachusetts
- Kanbar Hall, Bowdoin College, Brunswick, Maine
- Learning Laboratory for Complex Systems, MIT, Cambridge, Massachusetts
- Marine Technology & Life Sciences Seawater Research Complex, Rosenstiel School of Marine, Atmospheric, and Earth Science, University of Miami, Miami, Florida
- Marine Science Center at Fintas, Kuwait University, Fintas, Kuwait
- Nettie M. Stevens Science and Innovation Center, Westfield State University, Westfield, Massachusetts
- Peter Buck Center for Health and Fitness, Bowdoin College, Brunswick, Maine
- Pulichino Tong Business Center, University of Massachusetts Lowell, Lowell, Massachusetts
- Roux Center for the Environment, Bowdoin College, Brunswick, Maine
- Watson Center for Information Technology, Brown University, Providence, Rhode Island
- Williams College Bookstore, Williams College, Williamstown, Massachusetts

=== Aquariums ===
- Mote Aquarium, Sarasota, Florida
- National Aquarium, Baltimore, Maryland
- National Aquarium of Saudi Arabia, King Abdullah Financial District, Riyadh, Saudi Arabia
- New England Aquarium, Boston, Massachusetts, United States, the firm's first major commission
  - New England Giant Ocean Tank, New England Aquarium, Boston, Massachusetts
- North Carolina Aquarium at Roanoke Island, Manteo, North Carolina
- Lisbon Oceanarium, Lisbon, Portugal
- Osaka Aquarium Kaiyukan, Osaka, Japan
- Roundhouse Aquarium, Manhattan Beach, California
- Tennessee Aquarium, Chattanooga, Tennessee
- The Scientific Center of Kuwait, Salmiya, Kuwait
- Virginia Aquarium & Marine Science Center, Virginia Beach, Virginia
- World Alive Exhibits, Discovery Place Science, Charlotte, North Carolina

=== Civic ===
- Elevated Walkways, Logan International Airport, Boston, Massachusetts
- Gloucester Harborwalk, Gloucester, Massachusetts
- Howard Ulfelder, Maryland, Healing Garden, Yawkey Center for Outpatient Care, Massachusetts General Hospital, Boston, Massachusetts
- Kuwait Ministry of Education Headquarters Building, South Surra District, Kuwait
- Kuwait National Petroleum Company Headquarters, Ahmadi, Kuwait
- MBTA Design Guidelines, Boston, Massachusetts
- WBUR CitySpace, Boston University, Boston, Massachusetts
- West Cambridge Youth Center, Cambridge, Massachusetts
- Yawkey Center for Outpatient Care, Massachusetts General Hospital, Boston, Massachusetts

=== Hospitality ===
- Ames Hotel, Boston, Massachusetts
- Brookline Hilton Garden Inn, Brookline, Massachusetts
- Charles Hotel, Cambridge, Massachusetts
- Four Seasons Hotel & Private Residences One Dalton Street (with collaborating architects Pei Cobb Freed & Partners), Boston, Massachusetts
- Four Seasons Hotel & Private Residences New Orleans, New Orleans, Louisiana
- Hanover Inn at Dartmouth College, Hanover, New Hampshire
- Hilton Boston Logan Airport, Boston, Massachusetts
- PINE Restaurant at the Hanover Inn, Hanover, New Hampshire
- Revere Hotel Renovations, Boston, Massachusetts
- The Liberty Hotel, Boston, Massachusetts
- Williams Inn, Williams College, Williamstown, Massachusetts

=== Museums ===
- Boston Children's Museum, Boston, Massachusetts
- Canada Sports Hall of Fame, Calgary, Alberta, Canada
- Detroit Red Wings & Pistons Heritage Exhibit, Detroit, Michigan
- Discovery Museum of Acton, Acton, Massachusetts
- Children's Discovery Museum, Hohhot, Inner Mongolia, China
- KAFD Science Museum & Geo-Climate Center, Riyadh, Saudi Arabia
- Knock Knock Children's Museum, Baton Rouge, Louisiana
- Murphy Keller Education Center, Heifer International Headquarters, Little Rock, Arkansas
- Naismith Memorial Basketball Hall of Fame, Springfield, Massachusetts
- San Francisco 49ers Museum & Exhibits, Levi's Stadium, Santa Clara, California
- The Hall at Patriot Place, Gillette Stadium, Foxborough, Massachusetts
- World of Little League Museum Renovation and Exhibits, Williamsport, Pennsylvania
