= Nivola Museum =

Coordinates: 40.247°N 9.180°E

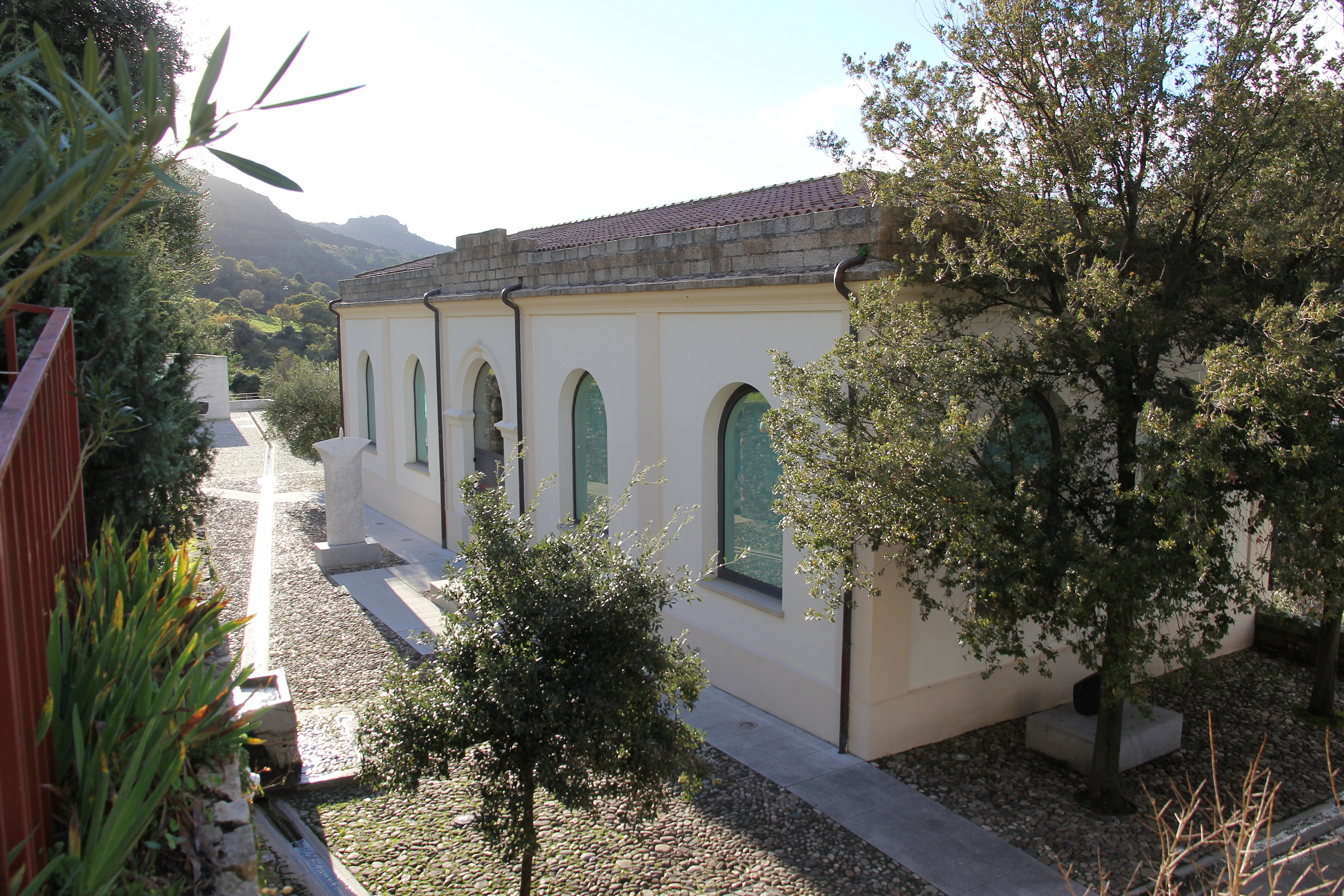
Orani, Costantino Nivola museum

The Nivola Museum (Italian: Museo Nivola; Sardinian: Museu Nivola) in Orani, Sardinia, Italy is an institution devoted to the work of artist Costantino Nivola (1911-1988) within the larger context of contemporary art, landscape, and living traditions.

The museum was established in 1994, a few years after his death, and has been expanding ever since. Nivola was an Orani native. The old wash-house was specially restored by architects Peter Chermayeff and Umberto Floris to house the museum, inaugurated in 1995.

The permanent collection consists of sculptural and graphic pieces by Nivola, who played a role in 20th century modernism as an artist who worked closely with architects.

Aside from exhibiting Nivola's work, the museum produces temporary exhibitions on a regular basis. These focus mainly on the relationship between art, architecture, and landscape, with a special interest on artists and movements that were close to Nivola. His friends included Le Corbusier, Jackson Pollock, Saul Steinberg, Willem de Kooning, Alexander Calder, and many other well-known mid-20th century artists.
