= List of people from Sardinia =

Sardinia is the second-largest island in the Mediterranean Sea, with a population of about 1.6 million people. The list includes notable natives of Sardinia, as well as those who were born elsewhere but spent a large part of their active life in Sardinia. People of Sardinian heritage and descent are in a separate section of this article.

== Academic figures and inventors ==
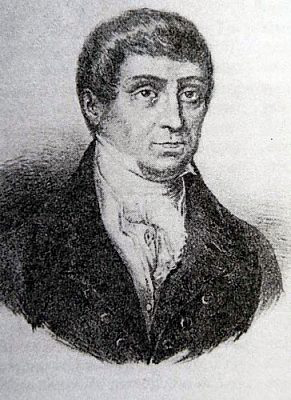
Domenico Alberto Azuni

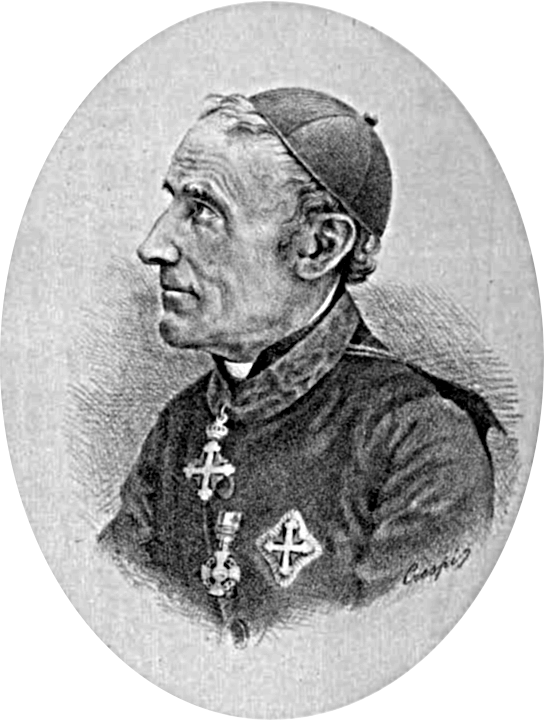
Giovanni Spano

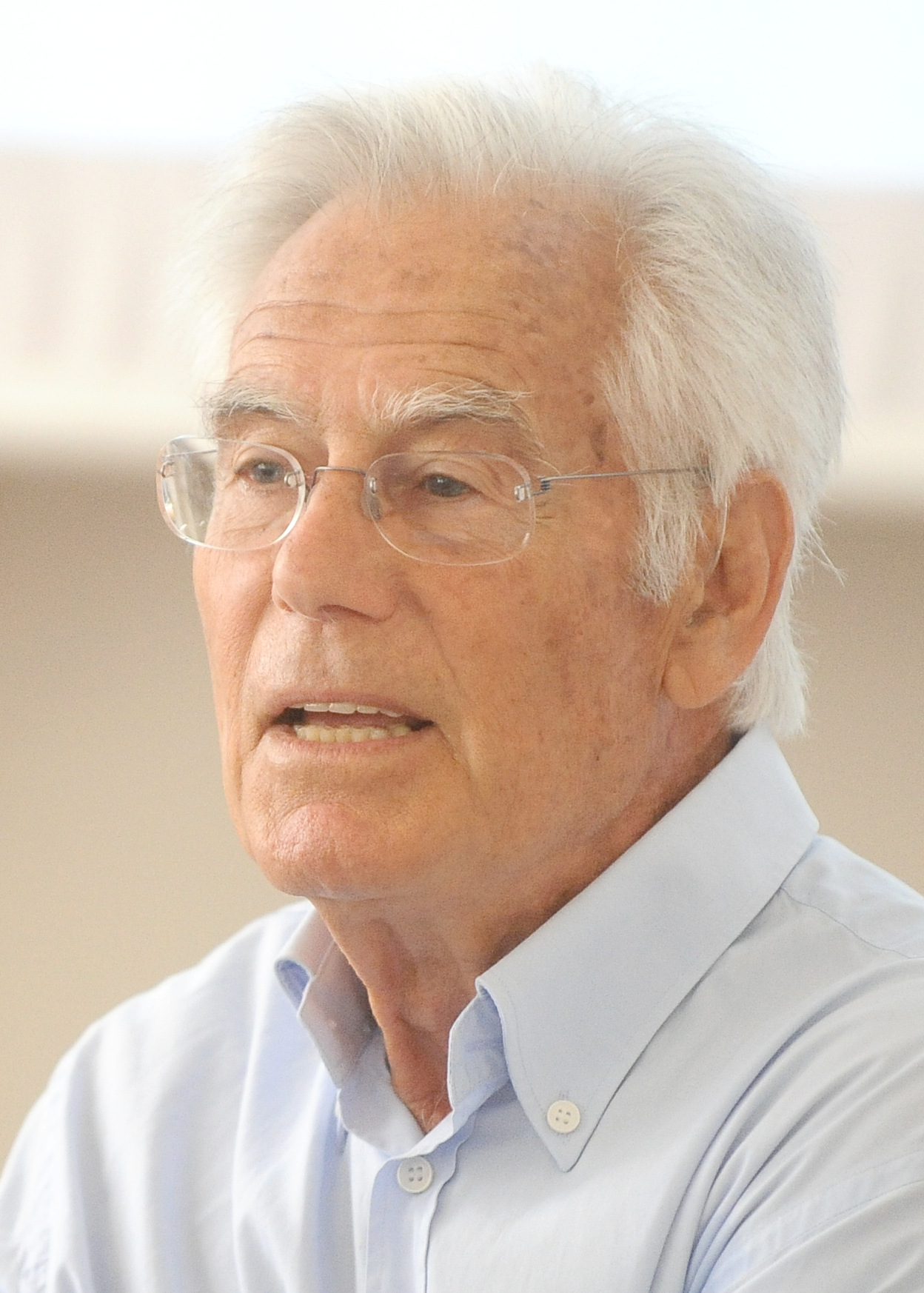
Gianluigi Gessa

- Pietro Amat di San Filippo (1826–1895), geographer, historian and bibliographer
- Giulio Angioni (1939–2016), writer and anthropologist
- Efisio Arru (1927–2000), parasitologist
- Domenico Alberto Azuni (1749–1827), jurist
- Ludovico Baille (1764–1869), historian
- Augusto Bissiri (1879–1968), inventor, credited as one of the first developers of television, the cathode-ray tube and the fax
- Remo Bodei (born in Cagliari, 1938), philosopher
- Francesco Antonio Boi (1767–1850), physician and anatomist
- Francesco Antonio Broccu (1797–1882), inventor, born in Gadoni, regarded as the first developer of the revolver
- Giuseppe Brotzu (1895–1976), pharmacologist, discoverer of cephalosporin based antibiotics, and candidate for the Nobel Prize in Medicine
- Carlo Cercignani (1939–2010), physicist and mathematician
- Fausto Cercignani (born 1941), scholar in linguistics
- Enrico Costa (born 1944), astrophysicist, known for studies on the gamma-ray bursts
- Erminio Costa (Cagliari 1924 – Washington 2009), neuroscientist
- Joan de Girgio Vitelli (Alghero 1870 – Rome 1916), lawyer and writer
- Carlo Fadda (1853–1931), jurist and politician
- Antonio Fais (1841–1925), mathematician and engineer
- Giovanni Francesco Fara (1543–1591), geographer and historian
- Walter Ferreri, astronomer
- Gian Luigi Gessa (born 1932), pharmacologist and neuropsychiatrist
- Pier Michele Giagaraccio (16th century AD), jurist, lawyer, and poet
- Paola Leone, neurologist, leader researcher of Canavan disease
- Giovanni Lilliu (1914–2012), archeologist, academician, publicist and politician
- Eva Mameli (1886–1978), botanist, naturalist and mathematician
- Lidia Mannuzzu (1958–2016), biologist, physiologist and academic
- Antonio Pigliaru (1922–1969), philosopher
- Salvatore Satta (1902–1975), jurist and writer
- Sebastiano Satta (1867–1914), poet, writer, lawyer and journalist
- Paolo Savona (born 1936), economist
- Giovanni Soro (died 1544), the Western world first great cryptanalyst; Soro was employed in Venice by the Council of Ten as cipher breaker-in-chief.
- Giovanni Spano (1803–1878), linguist and archaeologist
- Nicola Tanda (born 1928) philologist and literary critic
- Pasquale Tola (1800–1874), historian, magistrate and politician

== Activists ==
- Aurelio Chessa (1913–1996) anarchist, journalist and historian
- Giovanni Nuvoli

== Architects and designers ==
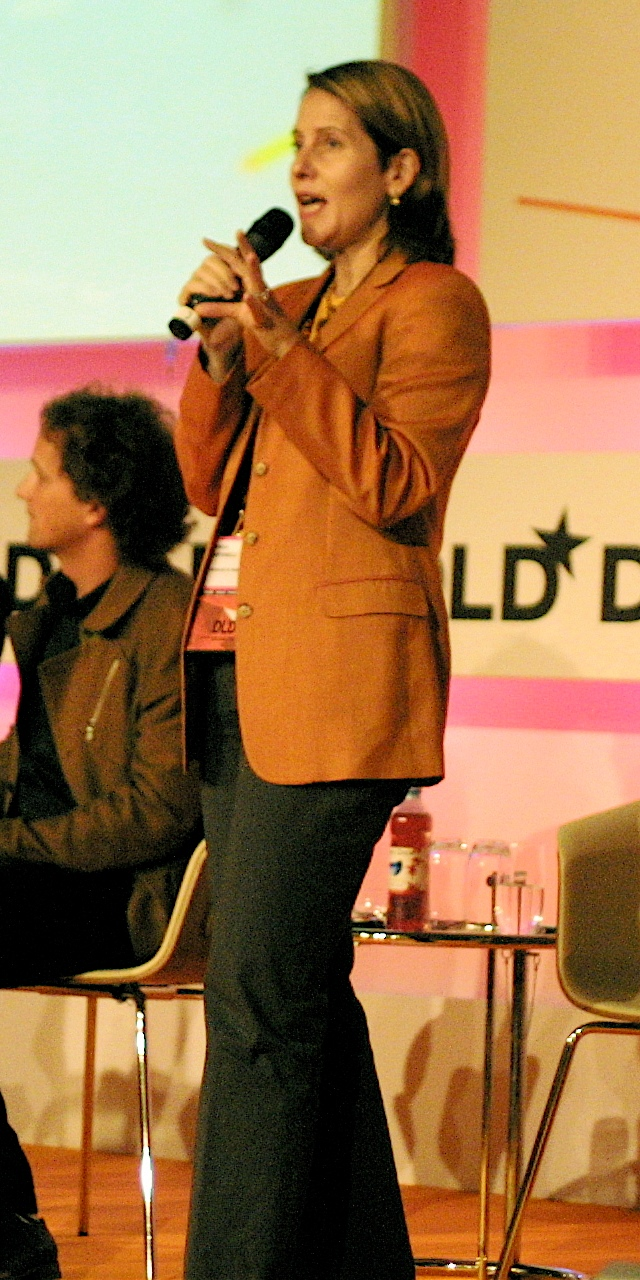
Paola Antonelli

- Paola Antonelli (born 1963), architect, senior Curator in the Department of Architecture and Design at the Museum of Modern Art in New York
- Carlo Battaglia (1933–2005), designer
- Ambra Medda (born 1982) designer, Sardinian mother and Austrian father
- Gaetano Cima (1805–1878), Neoclassical architect
- Fernando Clemente (1917–1998), architect and urbanist
- Francesco Boffo (1796–1867), Neoclassical architect
- Davis Ducart architect of the 18th-century
- Renzo Frau (Cagliari 1880 – 1926), designer
- Flavio Manzoni (born 1965), architect and car designer
- Alessandro Melis (born 1969), architect and writer
- Vico Mossa (1914–2003), Architect
- Enzo Satta, urbanist and architect
- Eugenio Tavolara (1901–1963), sculptor and designer

== Authors ==
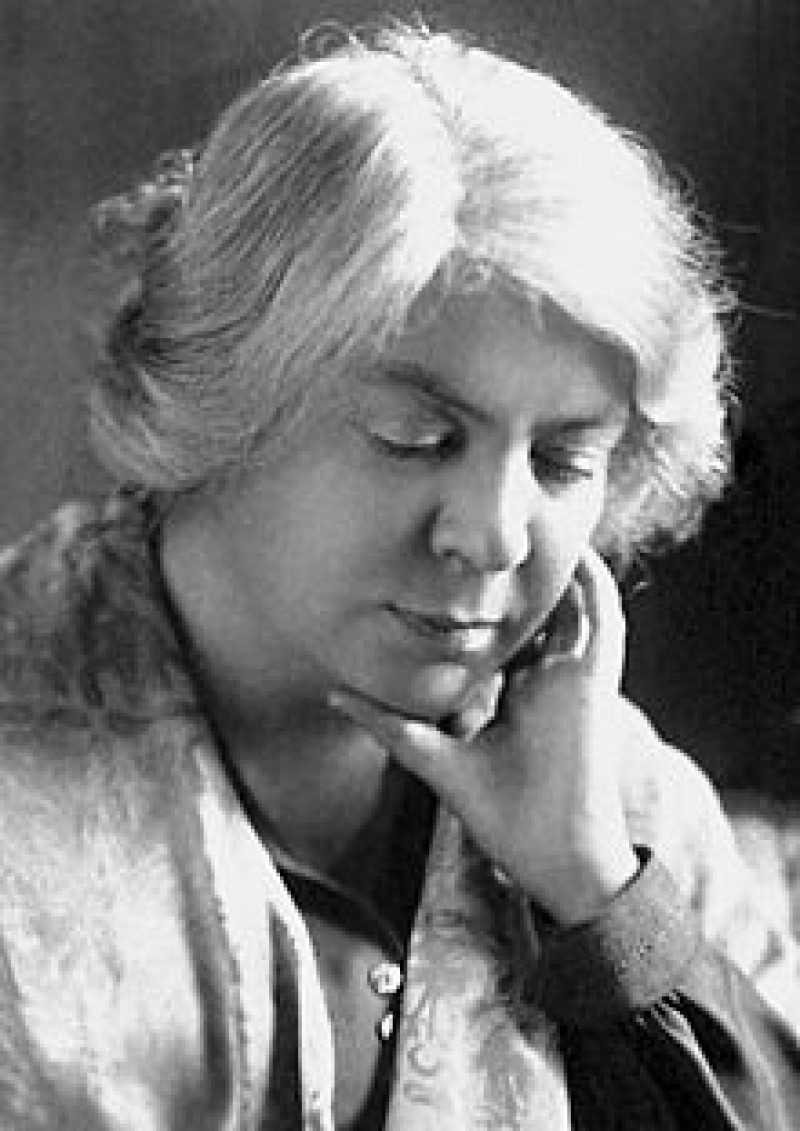
Grazia Deledda, Nobel Prize for Literature in 1926

- Milena Agus (born 1955)
- Francesco Alziator (1909–1977), writer and journalist
- Antonella Anedda (born 1955), half-Sardinian
- Giulio Angioni (1939–2017) writer and anthropologist
- Gerolamo Araolla (1542–1615)
- Sergio Atzeni (1952–1995)
- Vicente Bacallar Sanna (1669–1726)
- Ludovico Baille (1764–1839)
- Alberto Capitta (born 1954)
- Fausta Cialente (1898–1994)
- Antoni Cossu (1927–2002)
- Grazia Deledda (1871–1936), winner of the Nobel prize for literature
- Pietro Delitala (middle 16th century – 1613), poet
- Salvatore Farina (1846–1918), novelist
- Maria Chessa Lai (1922–2012), poet
- Gavino Ledda (born 1938)
- Emilio Lussu (1890–1975)
- Francesco Manunta i Baldino (1928–1995), poet
- Rita Carla Francesca Monticelli
- Melchiorre Murenu (1803–1854)
- Michela Murgia
- Salvatore Niffoi (born 1950), writer
- Rafael Sari (1904–1978), poet and writer
- Salvatore Satta (1902–1975), writer
- Flavio Soriga (born 1975) writer
- Pasqual Scanu (1908–1978)
- Tigellius (1st century BC – 40 BC), lyric poet during the time of Julius Caesar
- Pasquale Tola (1800–1874)
- Dolores Turchi (born 1935)

== Businessmen ==
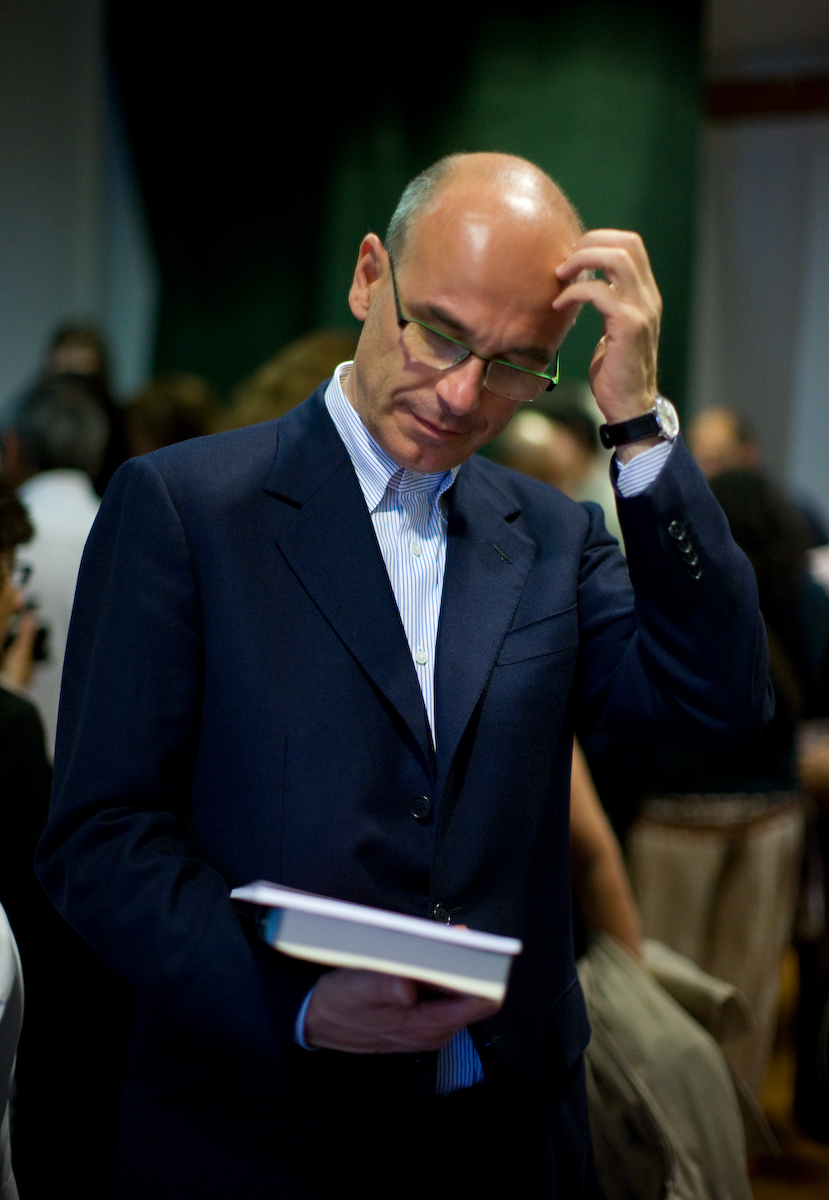
Renato Soru

- Massimo Cellino (born 1956), entrepreneur and football club owner
- Giovanni Antonio Sanna (1819–1875), entrepreneur and politician
- Renato Soru (born 1957), entrepreneur founder of Tiscali and former governor of Sardinia
- Salvatore Dau (1839–1914), tanner https://commons.wikimedia.org/wiki/File:Salvatore_Dau_1885.jpg

== Cinema and TV ==
=== Actors and actresses ===
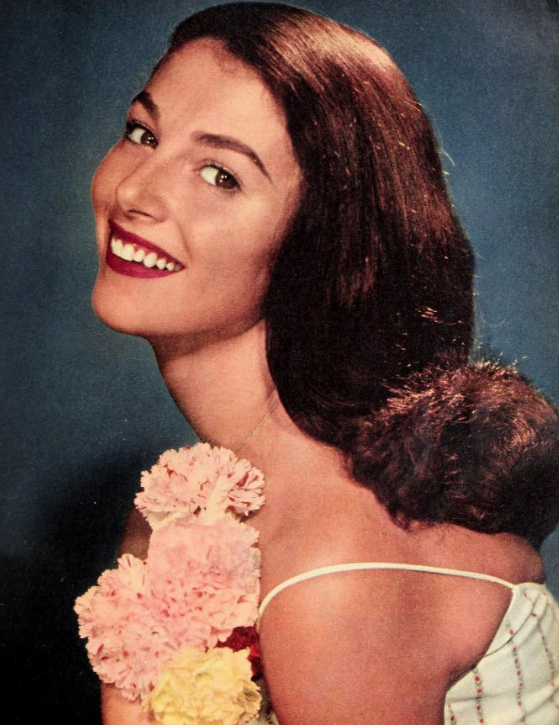
Pier Angeli

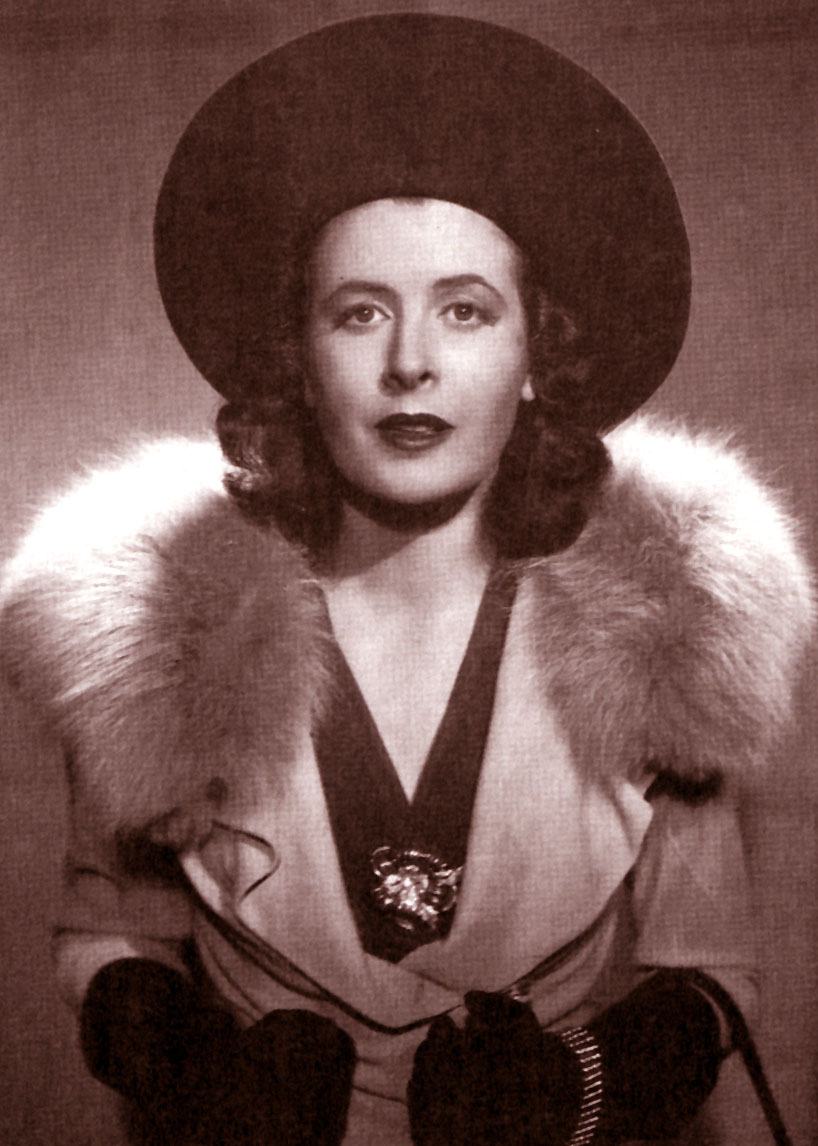
Rubi Dalma

- Gianni Agus (1917–1994)
- Andrea Arru (born 2007)
- Mavie Bardanzellu (1938–2022)
- Vittorio Congia (1930–2019)
- Rubi Dalma (1906–1994)
- Giancarlo Dettori (born 1932)
- Maria Frau (born 1930)
- Rossana Ghessa (born 1943)
- Rita Livesi (1915–1989)
- Mario Majeroni (1870–1931)
- Gloria Milland (1940–1989)
- Tiberio Murgia
- Caterina Murino
- Amedeo Nazzari
- Marisa Pierangeli
- Anna Maria Pierangeli, also known as Pier Angeli

=== Filmmakers ===
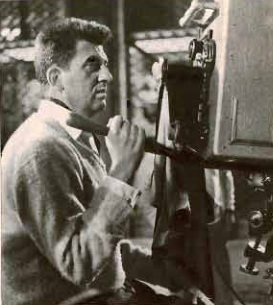
Nanni Loy

- Luigi Batzella
- Antonello Grimaldi
- Piero Livi (1925–2015), director and screenwriter
- Nanni Loy
- Sebastian Piras, photographer and filmmaker
- Fiorenzo Serra (1921–2005), documentarist
- Franco Solinas (1927–1982), screenwriter

=== Showgirls and fashion models ===
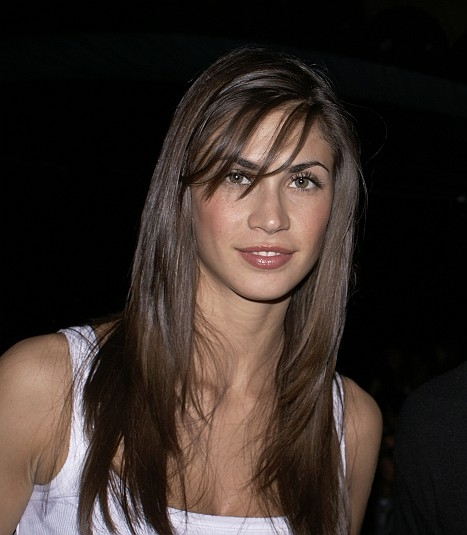
Melissa Satta

- Elisabetta Canalis
- Franca Dall'Olio (born 1945), Miss Italia 1963
- Alessandra Meloni (born 1972), Miss Italia 1994
- Giorgia Palmas
- Melissa Satta

== Police officers ==
Emanuela Loi

== Criminals ==
- Er Canaro (born 1956)
- Giovanni Corbeddu Salis (1844–1898), outlaw

== Journalists ==
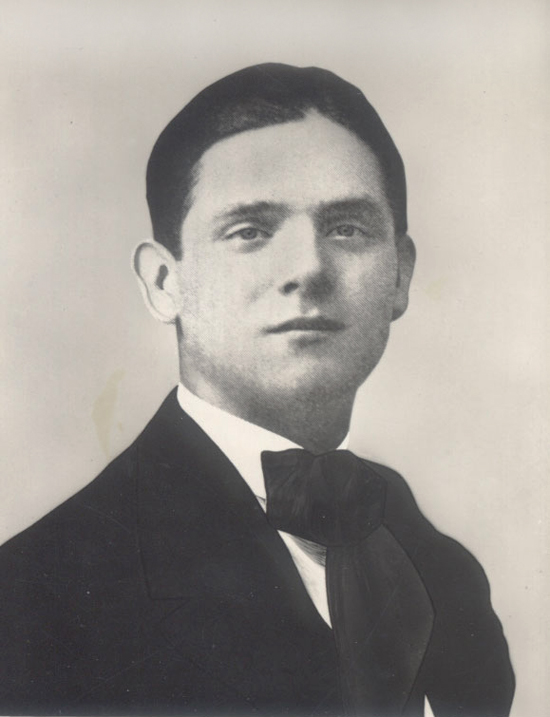
Attilio Deffenu

- Francesco Alziator (1909–1977), born in Cagliari
- Pasquale Chessa (born 1947), historian and journalist
- Attilio Deffenu (1890–1918) journalist, syndicalist and patriot
- Annalisa Piras (born 1971), journalist and film maker
- Cristiano Ruiu (born 1979)
- Aminata Aidara (born 1984) Sardinian mother and Senegalese father

== Mercenaries, soldiers and troops ==
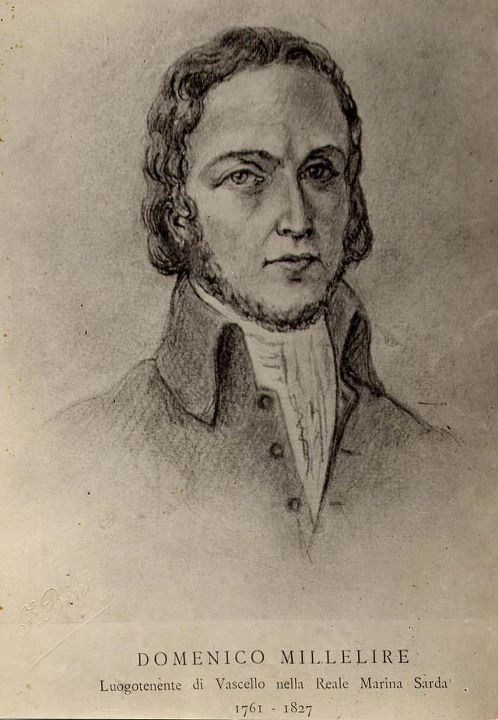
Domenico Millelire

- Mario Aramu (1900–1940), aviator
- Domenico Millelire (1761–1827), patriot, navy officer
- Antonio Todde (1889–2002), oldest man in the world at the date of his death and the third-oldest military veteran ever
- Efisio Tola (1803–1833), patriot
- Justin Tuveri (May 13, 1898 – October 5, 2007), one of the last Italian veterans of the First World War

== Musicians and singers ==
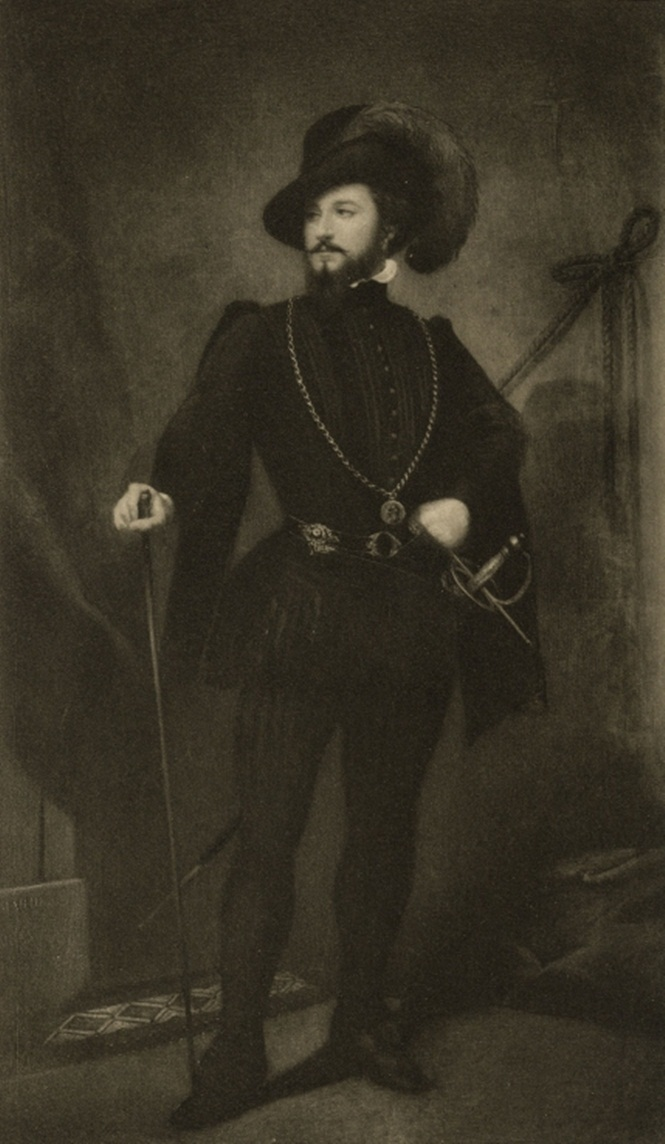
the tenor Giovanni Matteo De Candia.

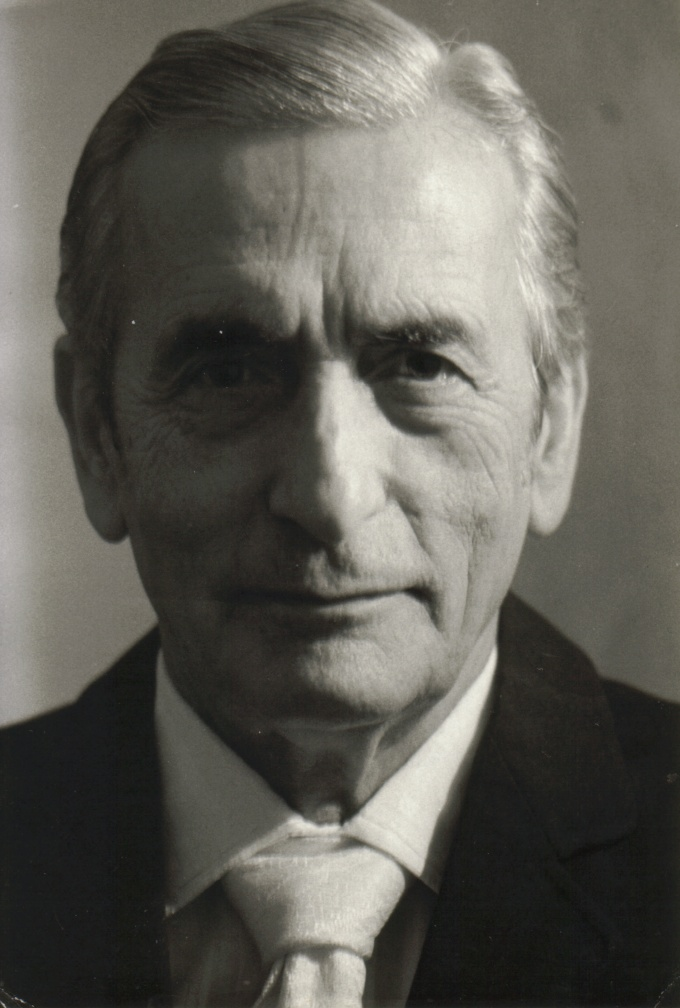
Giuseppe Anedda

- Giuseppe Anedda (1912–1997)
- Bianca Atzei (born 1987)
- Maria Carta
- Collage
- Giovanni Matteo De Candia, operatic singer (tenor), known as Mario
- Mahmood, singer born to a Sardinian mother and an Egyptian father
- Bernardo de Muro, operatic singer (tenor)
- Francesco Demuro
- Roberto Diana (born 1983), musician, guitarist, composer, producer and session man
- La Fossa (rap group)
- Paolo Fresu
- Mariano Garau (born 1952), composer and choral conductor
- Anna Tifu, violinist born to a Sardinian mother and Romanian father
- Luigi Lai
- Elena Ledda
- Bernadette Manca di Nissa
- Franca Masu (born 1962)
- Carmen Melis (1885–1967), operatic soprano
- Efisio Melis
- Roberto Meloni
- Salmo (rapper)
- Filomena Moretti, guitarist
- Franco Oppo (1935–2016), composer and scholar
- Aldo Piga, music compose
- Marisa Sannia
- Valerio Scanu
- Angelo Sotgiu (born 1946)
- Tazenda
- Tenores di Bitti

== Visual artists ==
=== Painters, illustrators, photographers, sculptors ===
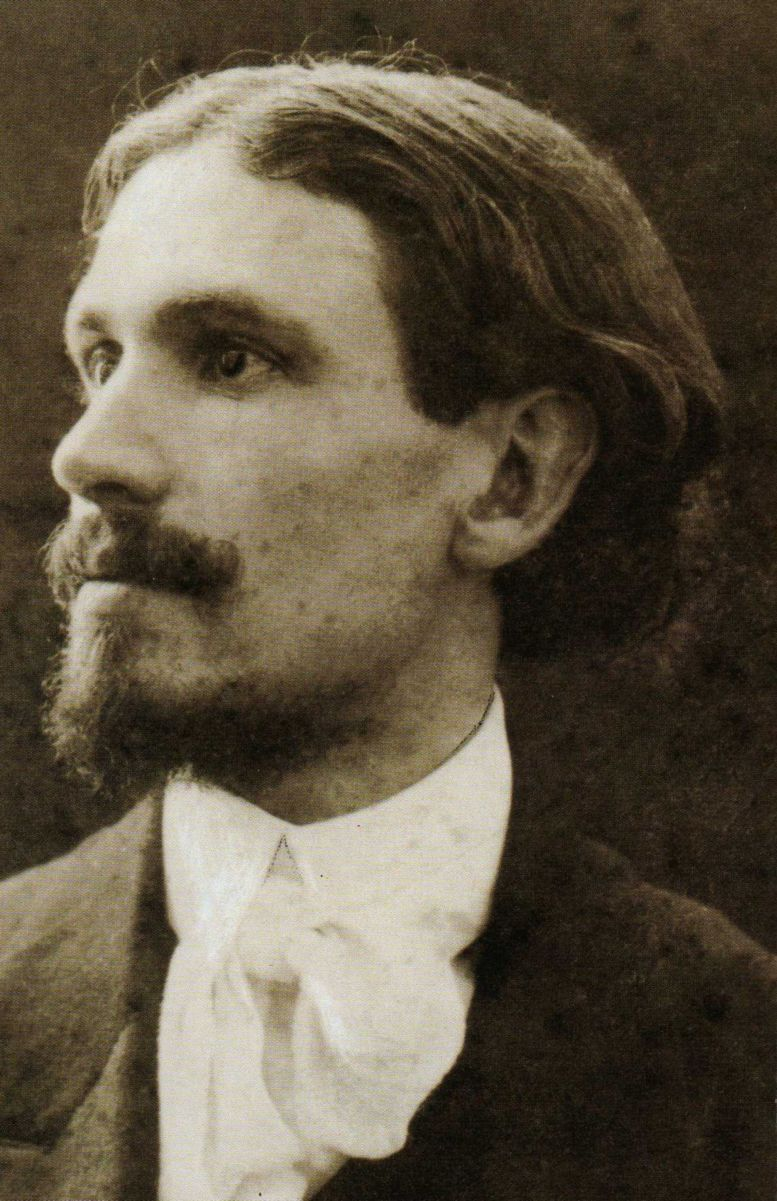
Francesco Ciusa

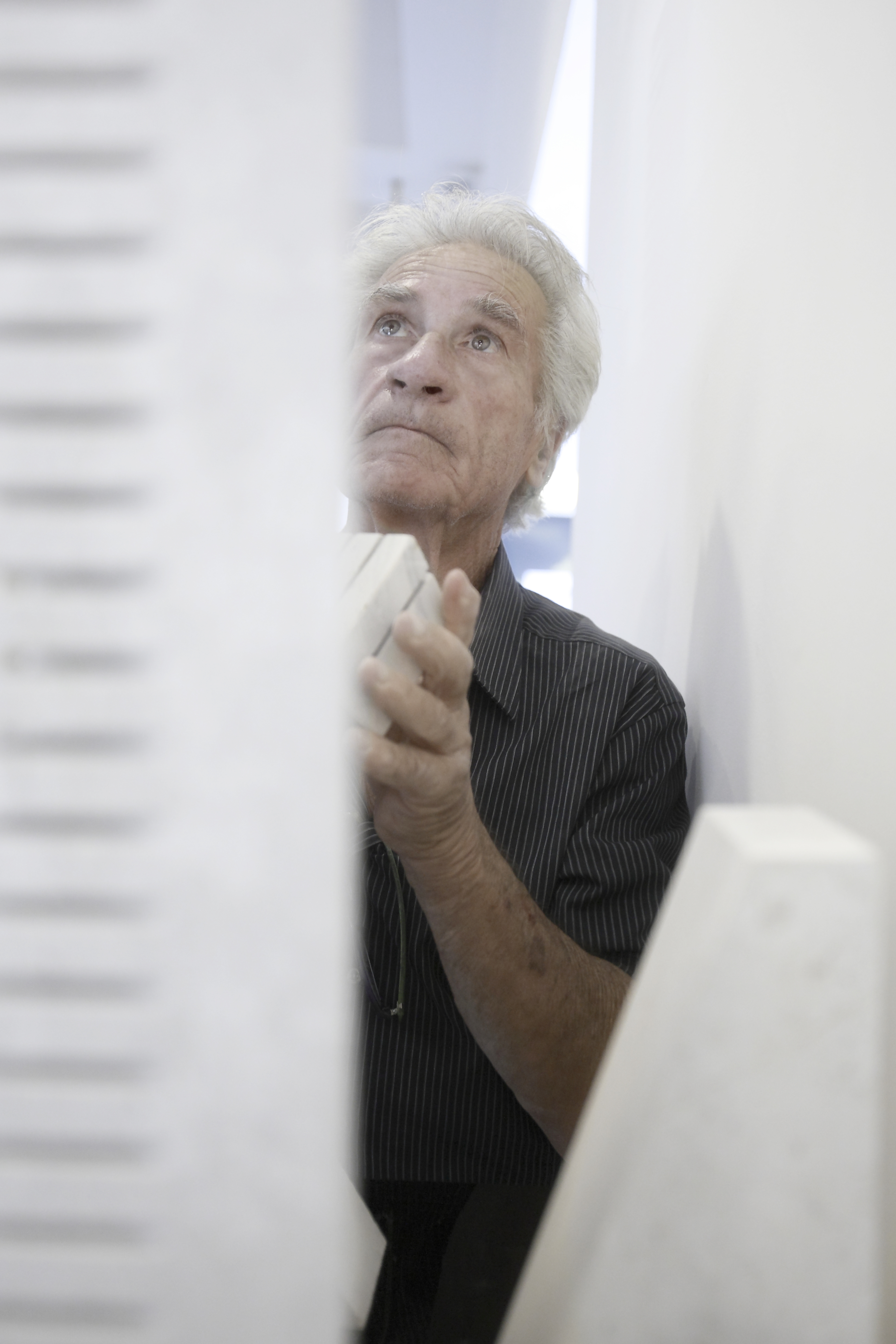
Pinuccio Sciola

- Edina Altara (1898–1983), illustrator and painter
- Giuseppe Biasi (1885–1945), painter
- Vittore Bocchetta (born 1918), sculptor, painter and academic
- Carlo Chessa (1855–1912), painter, printmaker, and illustrator
- Francesco Ciusa (1883–1949), sculptor
- Ignazio Fresu (born 1957), sculptor
- Giovanni del Giglio (died 1554), mannerist painter
- Master of Castelsardo (15th–16th century), painter
- Francesco Menzio (1899–1979), painter
- Costantino Nivola (1911–1988), sculptor
- Aligi Sassu (1912–2000), sculptor and painter
- Pinuccio Sciola (1942–2016), sculptor
- Mario Sironi (1885–1961), modernist, painter, sculptor, illustrator, and designer
- Maria Antonietta Tilloca
- Vittoria Valmaggia (1944–2009), painter, ceramist sculptor and designer

=== Cartoonists and comics creators ===
- Igort (real name Igor Tuveri) (born 1958)
- Graziano Origa (born 1952), cartoonist, punk artist
- Michele Medda (born 1962), comic writer

== Politicians ==
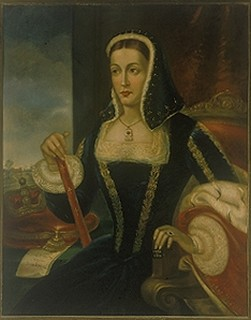
Eleanor of Arborea, queen of the Giudicato of Arborea (Sardinian: Judicadu de Arbarée)

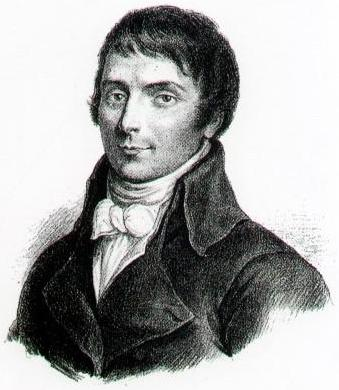
Giovanni Maria Angioy, Sardinian patriot

- Francesco Maria Barracu (1885-1945), fascist politician and soldier
- Giuseppe Abozzi (1882–1962), socialist
- Hasan Agha (fl. 1532–1544), ruler of the Regency of Algiers
- Camillo Bellieni (1893–1975), politician, founder of Partito Sardo d'Azione
- Giovanni Maria Angioy (1751–1808), politician and patriot
- Gavino Angius (born 1946), senator
- Vicente Bacallar Sanna (1669–1726), governor of Cagliari and Gallura, Spanish ambassador
- Benedetta of Cagliari (c. 1194–1232/1233), Italian
- Enrico Berlinguer (1922–1984), Italian Communist Party leader
- Giovanni Berlinguer (born 1924–6 April 2015), member of the European Parliament
- Luigi Berlinguer (born 25 July 1932–1 November 2023), Minister of Universities, Science and Technology
- Mario Berlinguer (1891–1969)
- Sergio Berlinguer (born 6 May 1934–17 October 2021)
- Nanni Campus (born 3 September 1952)
- Francesco Cocco-Ortu (1842–1929), minister of the Kingdom of Italy
- Michele Columbu (1914–2012), former member of the European Parliament
- Francesco Cossiga (1928–2010), former President of the Italian Republic
- Giuseppe Cossiga (born October 30, 1963)
- Bruno Dettori (born 1941), politician
- Oliviero Diliberto (born 1956), Party of Italian Communists leader
- Eleanor of Arborea (1347–1404), Italian of Arborea
- Gianfranco Ganau (born 3 March 1955)
- Antonio Gramsci (1891–1937), founding member of the Italian Communist Party
- Hugh I of Arborea (1178–1211), giudice of Arborea
- Ippolita Ludovisi (1663–1733), princess of Piombino
- Emilio Lussu (1890–1975), soldier, politician and writer
- Giuseppe Manno (1786–1868), magistrate, politician and historian
- Marianus IV of Arborea (1319–1376), giudice of Arborea
- Ospitone (6th century AD), chief of people of Barbagia
- Paolo Orano (1875–1945), psychologist, politician and writer
- Giuseppe Pisanu (born 1937), former Italian minister
- Edmondo Sanjust di Teulada (1858–1936), engineer and politician
- Giuseppe Saragat (1898–1988), President of the Italian Republic
- Michele Schirru (1899–1931), anarchist who attempted to assassinate Italian dictator Benito Mussolini
- Antonio Segni (1891–1972), former President of the Italian Republic
- Mario Segni (born 1939), former member of Italian Parliament and European Parliament
- Adelasia of Torres (1207–1259), giudicessa di Torres

== Sportspeople ==
=== Athletics ===
- Sandro Floris (born 1965), former sprinter
- Giorgio Marras (born 1971), former sprinter
- Eugenio Meloni (born 1994), high jumper
- Giovanni Puggioni (born 1966), former sprinter
- Antonio Siddi (1923–1983), former sprinter
- Filippo Tortu (born 1998), sprinter
- Valentina Uccheddu (born 1966), former long jumper

=== Basketball ===
- Federica Brunetti (born 1988)
- Massimo Chessa (born 1988), professional basketball player
- Luigi Datome
- Lidia Oppo (born 1995)
- Daniele Soro (born 1975)
- Marco Spissu (born 1995), professional basketball player

=== Bodybuilding ===
- Franco Columbu, Mr Olympia in 1976 and 1981, and Mr Universe 1970

=== Boxing ===
- Fernando Atzori (born 1942), olympic gold medalist
- Salvatore Burruni
- Enzo Calzaghe
- Simone Maludrottu, European bantamweight champion
- Gavino Matta
- Franco Udella, World Champion

=== Canoeing ===
- Pierangelo Congiu (born 1951), sprint canoer

=== Cycling ===
- Fabio Aru (born 1990), Vuelta a España winner
- Alberto Loddo (born 1979), retired

=== Equestrianism ===
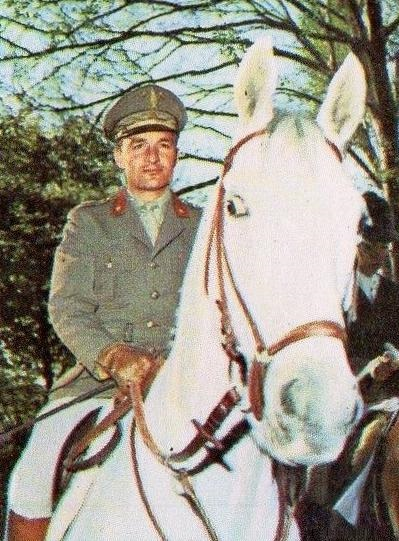
Paolo Angioni in 1968

- Paolo Angioni (born 1938), olympic champion

=== Extreme sports ===
- John Carta (1946–1990), skydiver and basejumper pioneer

=== Football ===
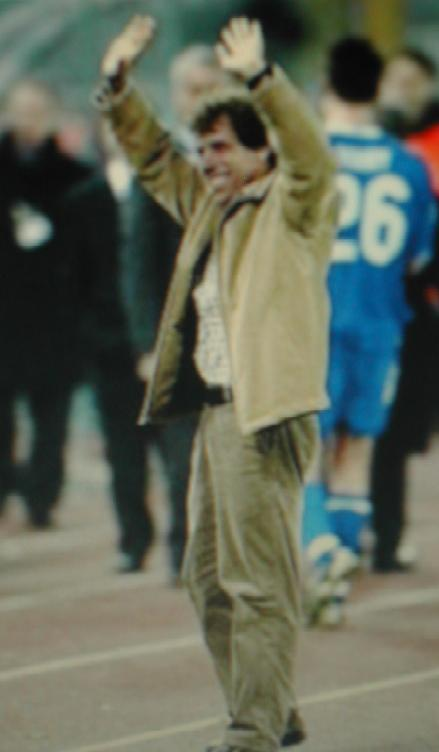
Gianfranco Zola

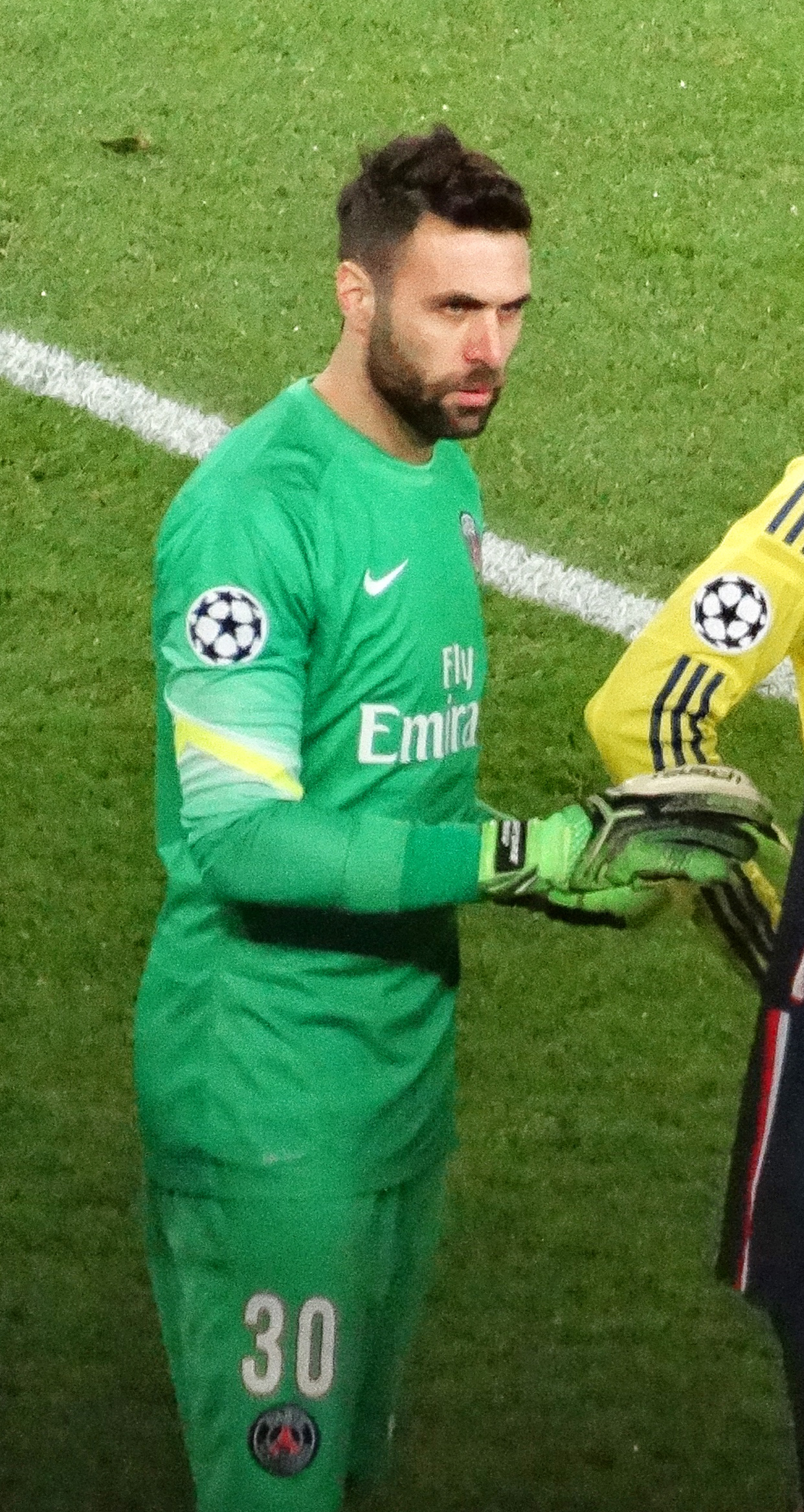
Salvatore Sirigu

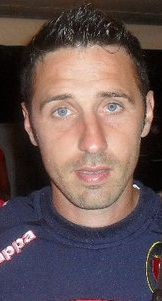
Andrea Cossu

- Simone Aresti (born 1986)
- Nicolò Barella (born 1997), Italian international, European champion 2020
- Salvatore Burrai (born 1987)
- Andrea Cocco (born 1986)
- Alessio Cossu (born 1986)
- Karim Laribi (born 1991), Sardinian mother and Tunisian father
- Andrea Cossu (born 1980), former Italian international
- Enrico Cotza (born 1988)
- Antonello Cuccureddu (born 1949), former Italian international
- Alessandro Farina (born 1979)
- Gianluca Festa (born 1969)
- Michele Fini (born 1974)
- Alessandro Frau (born 1977)
- Salvatore Fresi (born 1973)
- Gustavo Giagnoni (1932–2018)
- Nicola Lai (born 1986)
- Valentino Lai (born 1984)
- Marco Mancosu (born 1988)
- Matteo Mancosu (born 1984)
- Giuseppe Materazzi (born 1946)
- Gianfranco Matteoli (born 1959), former Italian international
- Nicola Murru (born 1994)
- Salvatore Pinna (born 1975)
- Francesco Pisano (born 1986)
- Andrea Pisanu (born 1982)
- Marco Sau (born 1987), Italian international
- Salvatore Sirigu (born 1987), Italian international
- Simona Sodini (born 1982), Italian women's international
- Giovanni Solinas (born 1968)
- Pietro Paolo Virdis (born 1957)
- Gianfranco Zola (born 1966), former Italian international
- Jordan Bouah (born 1995), Sardinian mother and Ivorian father

=== Horse racing ===
- Andrea Atzeni (born 1991)
- Giovanni Atzeni (born 1985)
- Andrea Degortes known as Aceto
- Gianfranco Dettori

=== Ice hockey ===
- Luca Sbisa

=== Modern pentathlon ===
- Mario Medda (1943–1981)

=== Motor racing ===
- Clemente Biondetti, Formula One racing driver
- Domenico Brigaglia (born 1958), motorcycle racer
- Omar Magliona (born 1977), racing driver
- Giovanni de Riu (1925–2008), racing driver
- Simone Sanna (born 1978), motorcycle racer

=== Rowing ===
- Francesco Cossu (1907–?)

=== Tennis ===
- Alessandro de Minicis (born 1963), retired

== Religious figures ==
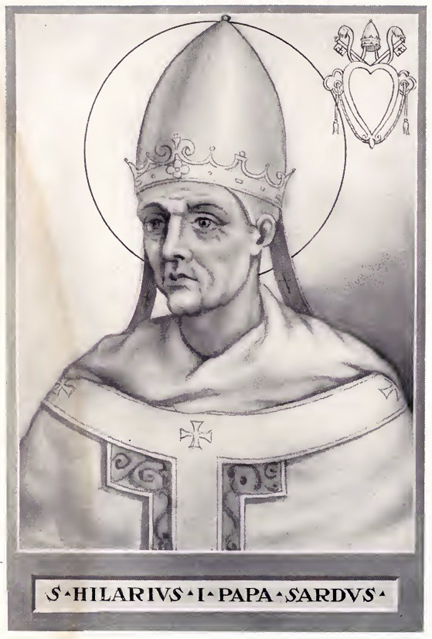
Pope Hilarius

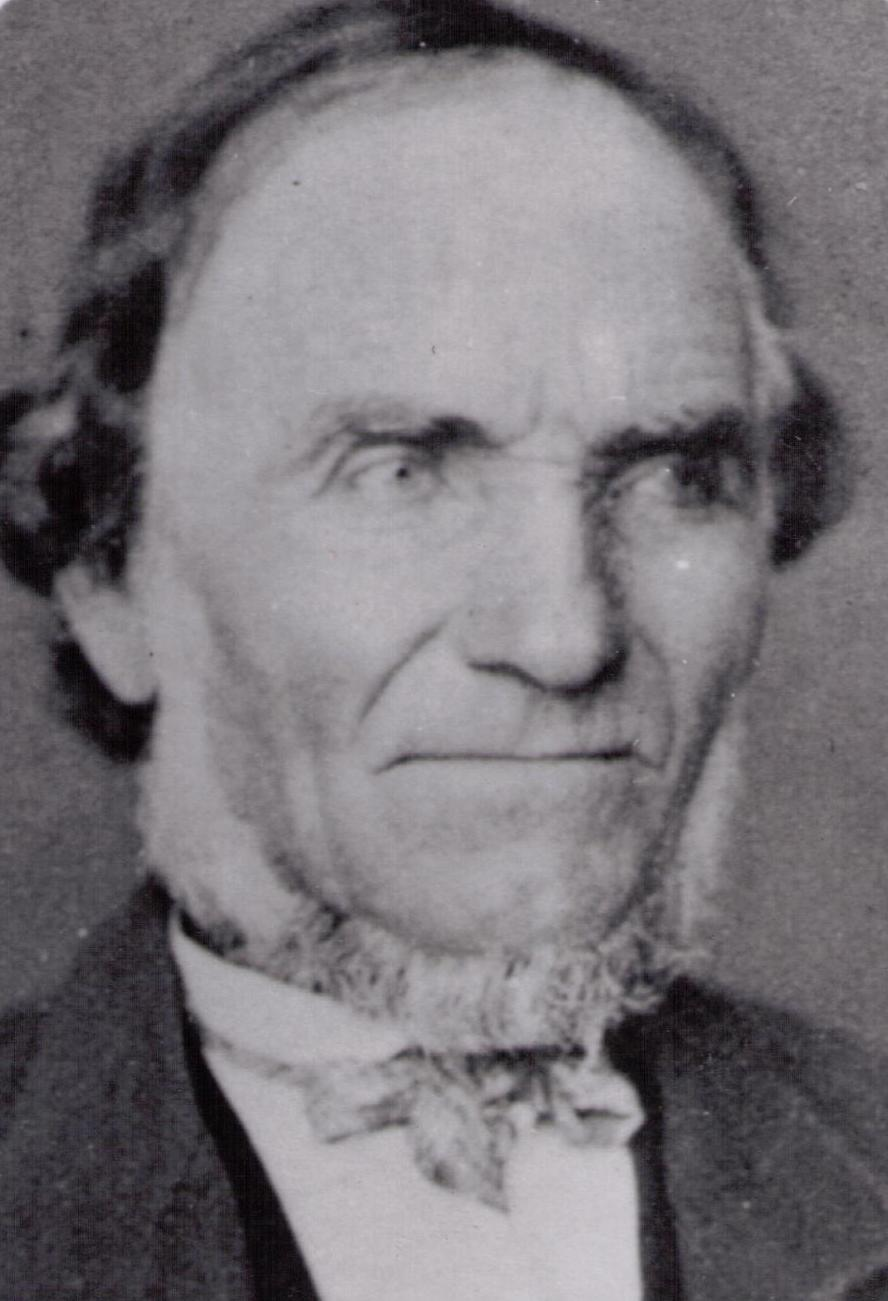
Joseph Toronto

- Abraham da Cagliari (8th century), Rabbi
- Ottorino Pietro Alberti (1927–2012) Archbishop
- Salvatore Alepus (1503–1568), Archbishop
- Luigi Amat di San Filippo e Sorso (1796–1878), Cardinal
- Antiochus of Sulcis (died c. 110), Christian martyr
- Hilary the Deacon (mid-4th century)
- Ilario Cao
- Nicholas Congiato (1816–1897), Jesuit, President of Santa Clara University
- Justa, Justina and Henedina, Christian martyrs
- Luigi De Magistris, Cardinal
- Giovanni Melis Fois, Prelate of Roman Catholic Church
- Ephysius (250–303), Christian martyr
- Eusebius of Vercelli
- Gavinus (4th century), Christian martyr
- Pope Hilarius (died 468), Pope
- Ignatius of Laconi (1701–1781)
- Lucifer (4th century), Bishop of Cagliari
- Antonia Mesina (1919–1935), martyr
- Carlo Mario Francesco Pompedda (1929–2006), Italian cardinal of the Roman Catholic Church and the Prefect of the Apostolic Signatura for the Roman Curia
- Riccus (13th century), Archbishop
- Elisabetta Sanna (1788–1857)
- Maria Gabriella Sagheddu (1914–1939), Saint Beatus
- Pope Symmachus (6th century), Pope
- Joseph Toronto (1818–1883), Mormon missionary
- Aloysius Varsi (1830–1900)
- Francesco Zirano (1565–1603), member of the Order of Friars Minor, beatified in 2014

== Notable people of Sardinian descent ==
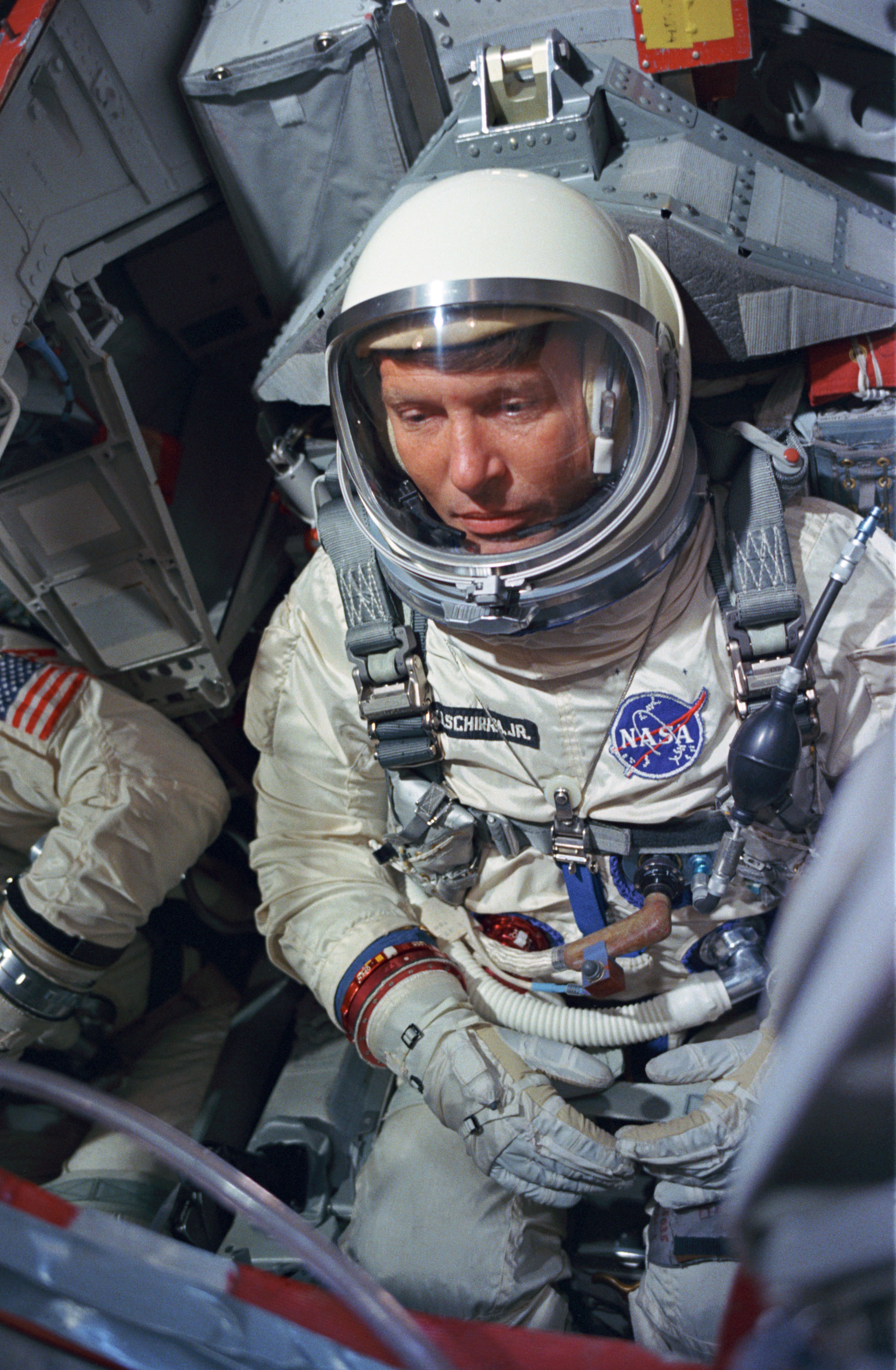
Wally Schirra, astronaut

- Ettore Pais (1856–1939), historian with Sardinian ancestry
- Gustavo Piga (born 1964), economist
- Ambra Medda (born 1982), designer
- Orazio Satta Puliga (1910–1974), car designer
- Italo Calvino (1923–1985), writer candidate for Nobel Prize in Literature with Sardinian ancestry from mother side
- Cecilia Maria de Candia (1853–1926), writer (Sardinian ancestry from father side)
- Goffredo Mameli, patriot and poet, creator of the Italian anthem (born in Genoa by Sardinian father)
- Eric Cantona (born 24 May 1966), French actor and football player with Sardinian ancestry
- Donatella Damiani (born 1958), Sardinian from father side
- Bruce Kirby (1925–2021), American actor, Sardinian ancestry
- Bruno Kirby (1949–2006), American actor, Sardinian ancestry
- Christopher Meloni, American actor, father from Sardinia
- Fernanda Montenegro (born 1929), Brazilian actress, with Sardinian ancestry from mother's side
- Sean Penn, American actor, Sardinian from mother side
- Bruno Putzulu, French actor, Sardinian ancestry
- Stefano Satta Flores, Sardinian ancestry
- Wally Schirra (1923–2007), astronaut with Sardinian ancestry
- Valeria Marini, born in Rome, Sardinian from mother side
- Pamela Prati, Sardinian from mother side
- Virginia Sanjust di Teulada (born 1977), Sardinian from father side
- Adriana Serra (1923–1995), actress and Miss Italia 1941 (Sardinian from father side)
- Corrado Augias (born 26 January 1935), Sardinian ancestry
- Mino Carta (born 1933), Sardinian parents
- Jean-Marc Morandini (born 1965), Sardinian from mother side
- Barbara Serra (born 1974), Sardinian from father side
- Efisio Tola (1803–1833), patriot

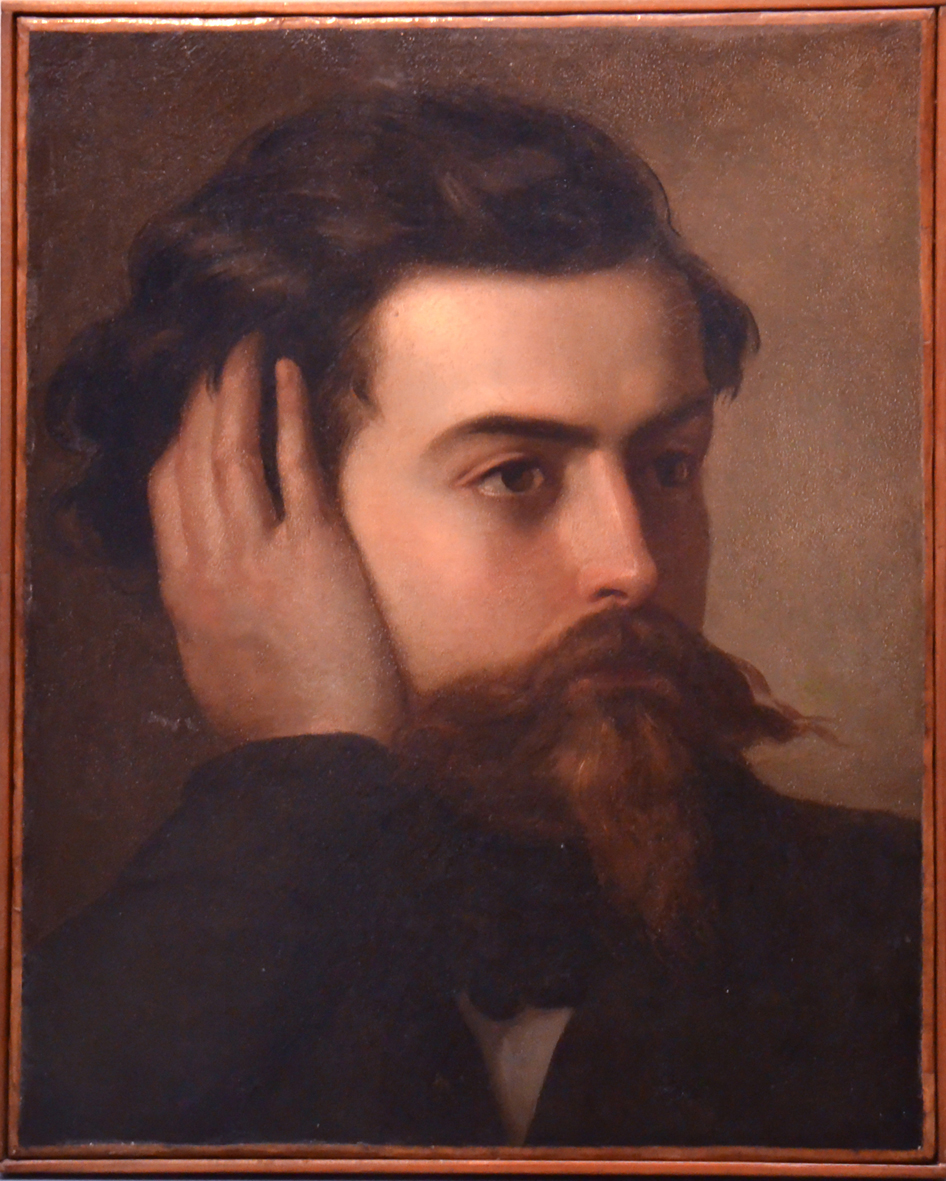
Goffredo Mameli, author of Italian national anthem (Genoese of Sardinian ancestry).

- Ricky Gianco (born Riccardo Sanna, 1943), singer-songwriter, guitarist and record producer, with partial Sardinian ancestry
- Ivan Graziani, Sardinian from mother side
- Nyco Lilliu (born 1987), Sardinian ancestry
- Pierrick Lilliu (born 1986), Sardinian ancestry
- Ugo Mulas (1928–1973), photographer with Sardinian ancestry
- Aurelio Galleppini (1917–1994), His parents were Sardinians

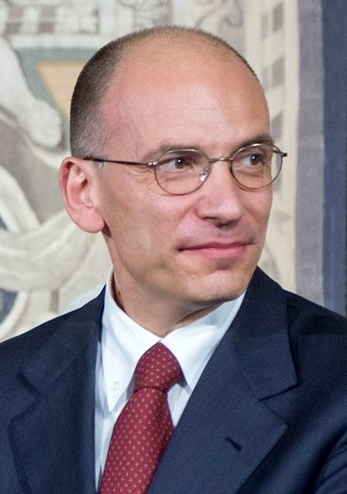
Enrico Letta, Pisan of Sardinian ancestry.

- Graziano Delrio (born 1960), Italian Minister of Infrastructure and Transport with Sardinian ancestry
- Beji Caid Essebsi (1926–2019), first democratically elected President of Tunisia (Paternal great-great-grandfather from Sardinia)
- Enrico Letta (born 1966), former Prime Minister of Italy. Sardinian from mother side.
- Jean-Paul Marat (from the father side) (1743–1793), politician during the French Revolution
- Giorgia Meloni (born 1977), Prime minister of Italy (Sardinian from father side)
- Juan Domingo Perón (1895–1974), President of Argentina (Sardinian descent from father side)
- Silvia Salis (born in Genoa, Sardinian ancestry)
- Luigi Datome (born 1987), professional basketball player with Sardinian ancestry
- Joe Calzaghe, father Enzo from Sardinia
- Nicolino Locche (1939–2005), Argentine boxer with Sardinian ancestry
- Duilio Loi, Sardinian from father side
- Graciano Rocchigiani, father Zanubio from Sardinia
- Mattia Aramu (born 1995), Sardinian parents
- Dennis Chessa (born 1992), Sardinian ancestry
- Marco Materazzi, mother from Tempio, father from Arborea, province of Oristano
- Frankie Dettori, born in Milan from Sardinian parents
- Fabio Carta, born in Torino, Sardinian parents
- Andreia Marras (born 1971), Sardinian ancestry
- Alessandro Mahmoud (Mahmood), born in Milan from Sardinian mother

== See also ==
- Sardinian people
- List of Italians
