= Antonio Lo Frasso =

- Born: 1540; Alghero
- Died: 1600 (aged 59–60); Cagliari
- Occupations: poet, writer, soldier

Antonio Lo Frasso (1540, in Alghero, Sardinia – 1600, in Cagliari) was a Sardinian poet, writer and soldier. He was the author of Los diez libros de Fortuna de Amor, a work mentioned by Miguel de Cervantes in Don Quixote (in The library of Don Quixote) and edited in London by the lexicographer Pedro Pineda who considered valuable this work for his kindness, elegance and spirit («su bondad, elegancia y agudeza»).

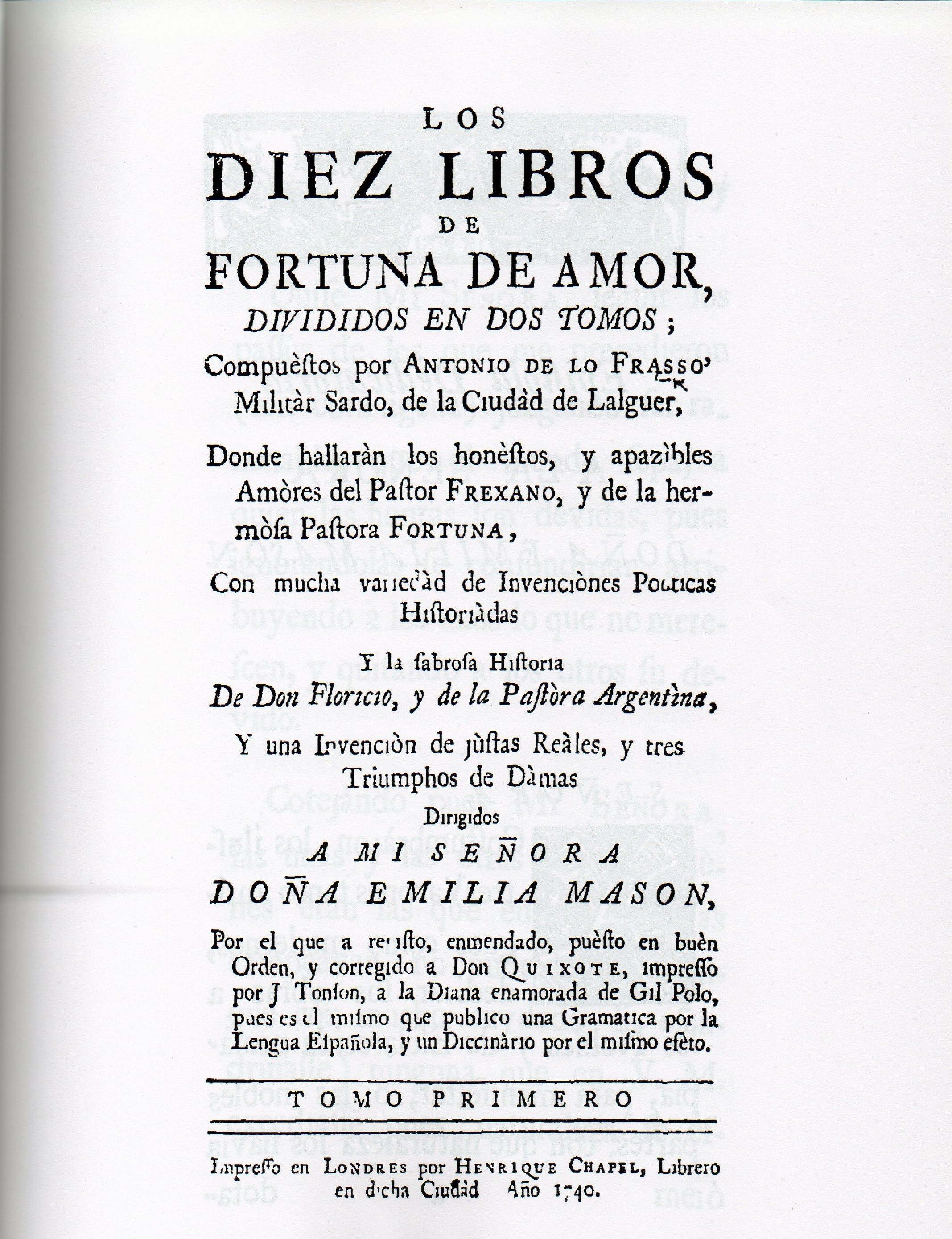
Los Diez Libros de Fortuna de Amor, ed. 1740

== Biography ==
What little information we have about his life are those contained in his works, where he calls himself a militar sardo de la ciudad de L'Alguer (a Sardinian soldier from the town of Alghero). He also reported to have been unjustly charged with murder for the love of a young lady from Alghero, for which he was locked up in jail and was later forced to leave Sardinia. Lo Frasso took then refuge in Barcelona between 1565 and 1571. He published there his first book in 1571, with the title of Los mil y dozientos consejos y avisos discretos sobre los siete grados y estamentos de nuestra humana vida, subsequently published El verdadero discurso de la victoria, focused on his glorious vicissitudes during the Battle of Lepanto. However, Lo Frasso owes his fame mostly to the pastoral novel in Ottava rima Los diez libros de Fortuna de Amor, supposedly inspired by the works of the Neapolitan writer Jacopo Sannazzaro. He also wrote sonnets and octaves in Sardinian, confirming he got in touch with Gerolamo Araolla and Giovanni Francesco Fara.

== Works ==
- Los mil y dozientos consejos y avisos discretos sobre los siete grados y estamentos de nuestra humana vida, Barcelona, 1571.
- El verdadero discurso de la gloriosa victoria, Barcelona, 1571.
- Los diez libros de Fortuna de Amor, Barcelona, 1573 and London, 1740.

== Bibliography ==
- Pasquale Tola, Dizionario Biografico degli uomini illustri di Sardegna, Torino, 1837–38, vol. II, pp. 105–106.
- G. Siotto Pintor, Storia letteraria di Sardegna, Cagliari, 1843–44, vol. III, pp. 461–467; vol. IV, pp. 71, 88, 120–123.
- D. E. Toda y Guell, Bibliografía española de Cerdeña, Madrid, Tipografía de los Huérfanos, 1890, pp. 207–208, nn. 608–609.
- R. Truffi, Antonio Frasso poeta sardo del secolo XVI, Il canto per la battaglia di Lepanto, Tre trionfi di donne, "Bollettino bibliografico sardo", III, 1909, pp. 45ss.
- M. Menéndez Pelayo, Amplio juicio crítico sobre Antonio de Lofrasso, Madrid, C.S.I.C., 1943, t. II.
- Francesco Alziator, Storia della letteratura di Sardegna, Cagliari, 1954.
- F. Alziator, Introduzione all'opera di Antonio Lo Frasso, Cagliari, 1974.
- Patrizia Serra (a cura di), Questioni di letteratura sarda. Un paradigma da definire, Milano, 2012, n. 17, pp. 105–106
