= Baille =

Baille may refer to:

- Baille, Marseille, a neighbourhood in Marseille, France
- Baille (surname)
- Baillé, a French commune in Brittany
