= Scanu =

Scanu is a surname. Notable people with the surname include:

- Pasqual Scanu (1908–1978), Italian educator and writer
- Valerio Scanu (born 1990), Italian singer
- Giovanni Scanu (born 1975), Italian football manager
