= Efisio Tola =

Italian patriot (1803–1833)

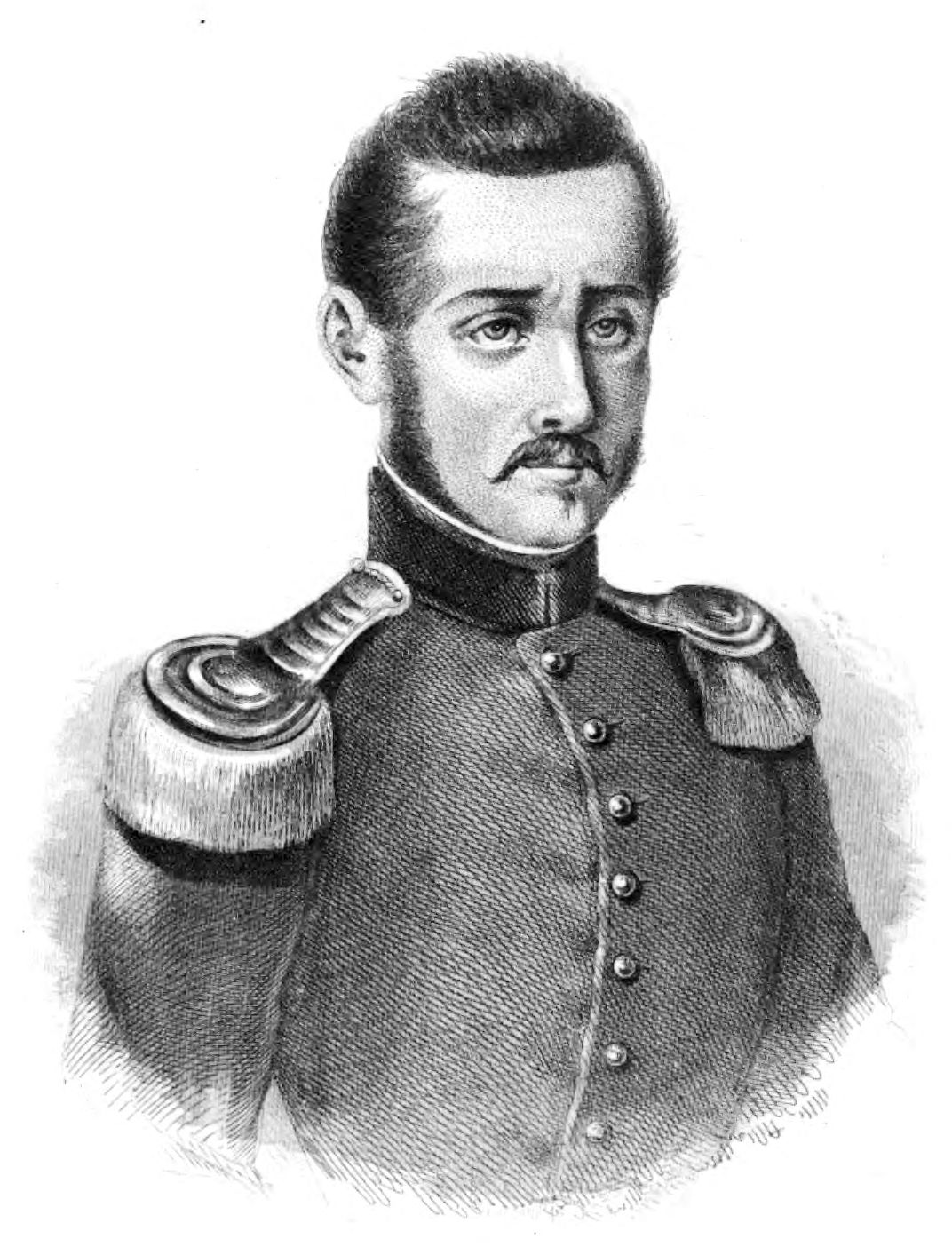
Efisio Tola

Efisio Tola (1803 – 12 June 1833) was an Italian patriot. Born in Sassari, Sardinia to a noble family, he was the brother of the politician and magistrate Pasquale Tola.

Efisio Tola was lieutenant of the Pinerolo Brigade, and a member of the Giovine Italia. Due to his membership he was arrested. Tola refused to reveal the names of his companions, and was sentenced to death in Chambéry (then part of the Kingdom of Sardinia) in 1833.

In Sassari the Piazza Tola (Piazza Efisio e Pasquale Tola) in the historical centre is named after the brothers.

== Biography ==
Efisio Tola was born in Palazzo Tola in Sassari. Two plaques still commemorate his birth. Belonging to a distinguished family from Sassari, he had received a good humanistic education. His parents were named Gavino Tola and Maria Tealdi, and his brother Pasquale Tola was a famous jurist, History, and Diplomatics.

Luogotenente of the Mechanized Brigade "Pinerolo", in Savoy he had contacts with Giovine Italia, founded shortly before (July 1831) by Giuseppe Mazzini and initially widespread among the military of the Kingdom of Sardinia (1720-1861). The first soldiers belonging to Mazzini's society were discovered by chance in Genoa, and the members of the entire organization were identified after the confessions of one of its members. The first trial took place in Chambéry in May 1833, and Tola's behavior was exemplary .

== Bibliography ==
- Sebastiano Deledda, Una biografia inedita di Efisio Tola. Sassari, Stamperia della Libreria italiana e straniera, 1931.
- Alessio Petrizzo, TOLA, Efisio Antonio Aloisio, in Dizionario biografico degli italiani, vol. 95, Roma, Istituto dell'Enciclopedia Italiana, 2019.
