= Baille (surname) =

Baille is a surname. Notable people with the surname include:

- Baptistin Baille (1841–1918), French academic
- Cyril Baille (born 1993), French rugby player
- Ludovico Baille (1764–1839), Sardinian historian
