= Vittoria Valmaggia =

Italian artist (1944–2009)

Vittoria Valmaggia (29 March 1944 in Oria – 31 October 2009 in Modena) was an Italian artist. Known also as Rina Conforti or Tappin, she was a ceramist, painter, stylist and the first Sardinian artist to produce dolls in traditional costumes combining multiple fabrics, gold and silver miniature jewellery, copper and ceramics.

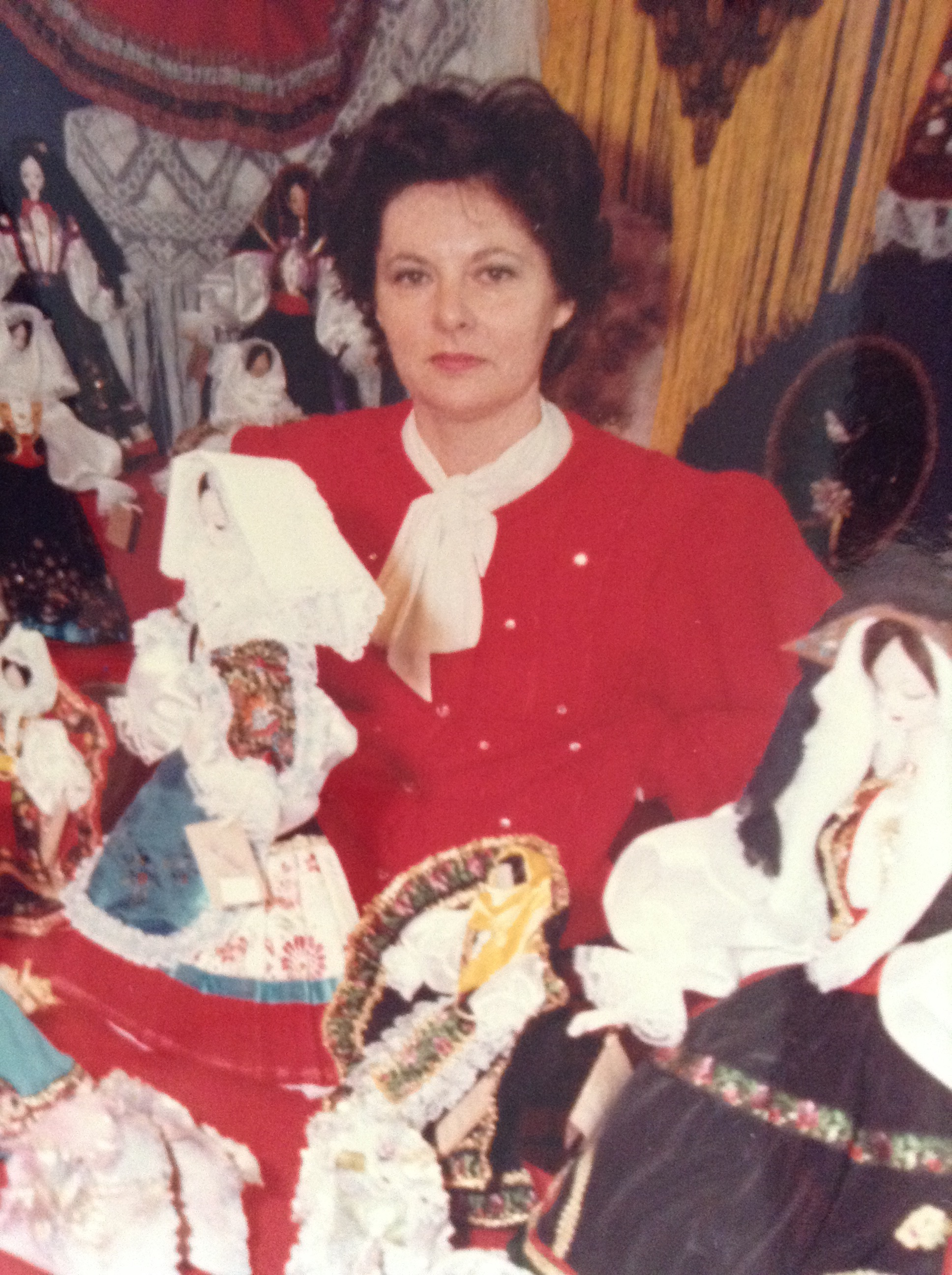
Vittoria Valmaggia with her dolls in traditional Sardinian costumes

== Biography ==
Vittoria Valmaggia was attending elementary school in Apulia when she moved with her family to Sardinia - homeland of her grandmother. As the eldest of the four children, she was constrained to take care about her mother and brothers due to the parents’ divorce, soon after graduation in accounting. She first worked for an insurance company, then was offered a job at Insar in Stintino by Angelo Moratti until 1969.

In 1966, passion for the local art transmitted her by the grandmother, native of Borutta, resulted in opening, in parallel to her job, the first shop with carved wood furnitures in Stintino. In addition, she gratified by designing interiors of villas for tourists.

In the 1969-1972 Valmaggia opened a crafts shop in Palau called “Rina Palau” where she still sold furnitures, but already extended her activity to painted clothing, antiques and Sardinian jewellery. During this period she met priest Giacomino Canu from the parish of Baja Sardinia and developed interest for oil painting.

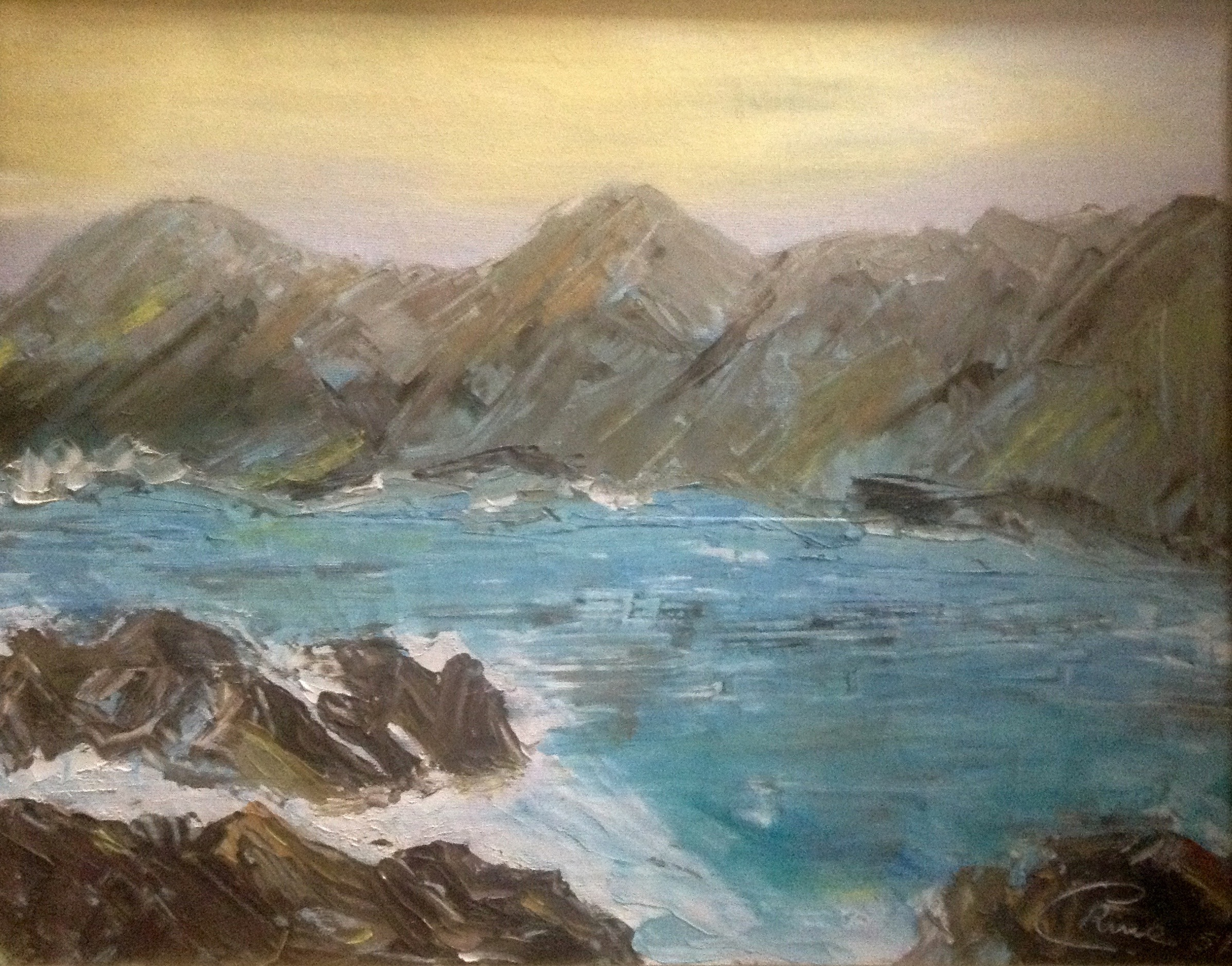
"Sea and rocks of Capo Falcone (Stintino)" by Vittoria Valmaggia (1977)

After marrying Gerardo Conforti - a carabinieri marshal, she moved to Riola Sardo where her husband commanded a local station in the 1973-1977. In these years she painted “Sea and rocks in Capo Falcone (Stintino)” exhibited at “Galleria ENFAC” in Turin. Due to her husband’s job she moved, this time to the |island of La Maddalena, where in the 1977-1982 she concentrated on painting. Her works, inspired by the nature around and often exhibited in private lounges, depicted deciduous flowers, coastal landscapes with a stormy sea and boats at the sunset. At the same time Valmaggia focused on her main passion - traditions and costumes of Sardinia, studied thoroughly from historical documents and rare books on Sardinian culture. In collaboration with I.S.O.L.A., she dedicated herself to mannequin-dolls in Sardinian costumes characterized by faces made of empty nutshells covered with nylon veil.

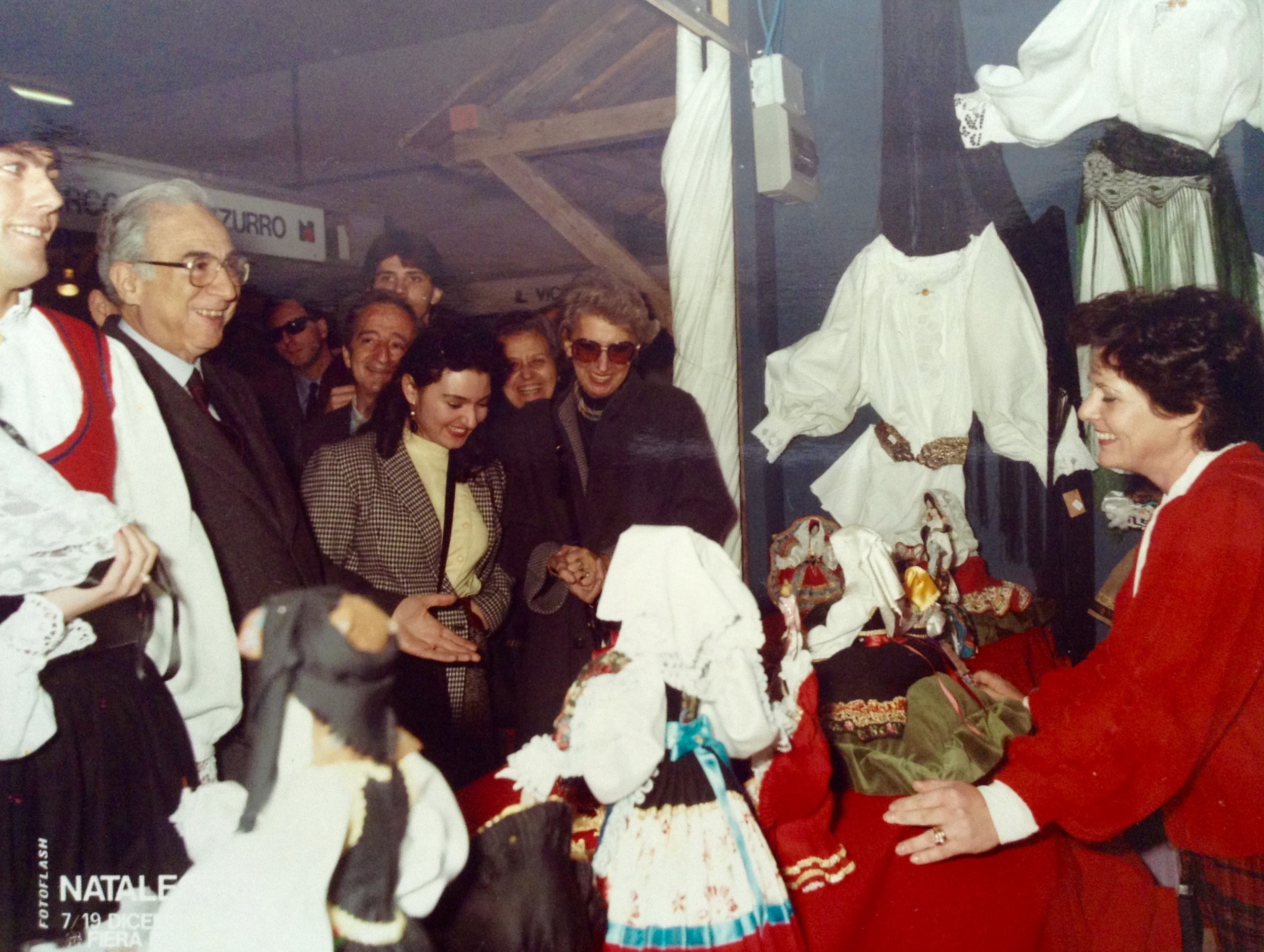
Vittoria Valmaggia and president Francesco Cossiga at the Fair of Rome 1984

In 1983 the dolls in great demand convinced her husband to take his formal leave from carabinieri in order to support her in management of the activity. In the same year they opened the first art shop and gallery in Cannigione called “Tappin” and with this signature many of her creations became famous. During this period she elaborated dolls’ structure substituting nutshells by ceramic faces and adding ceramic hands. Entirely hand crafted - feature that guaranteed uniqueness of every art piece, 25 cm to one meter tall, the dolls were composed of a precious copper structure covered by a soft layer of foam giving shape to fabrics including brocade, damask, lampas, coarse woollen fabric and Sardinian velvet with lace elements. The costume was then adorned with traditional gold and silver miniature jewels.

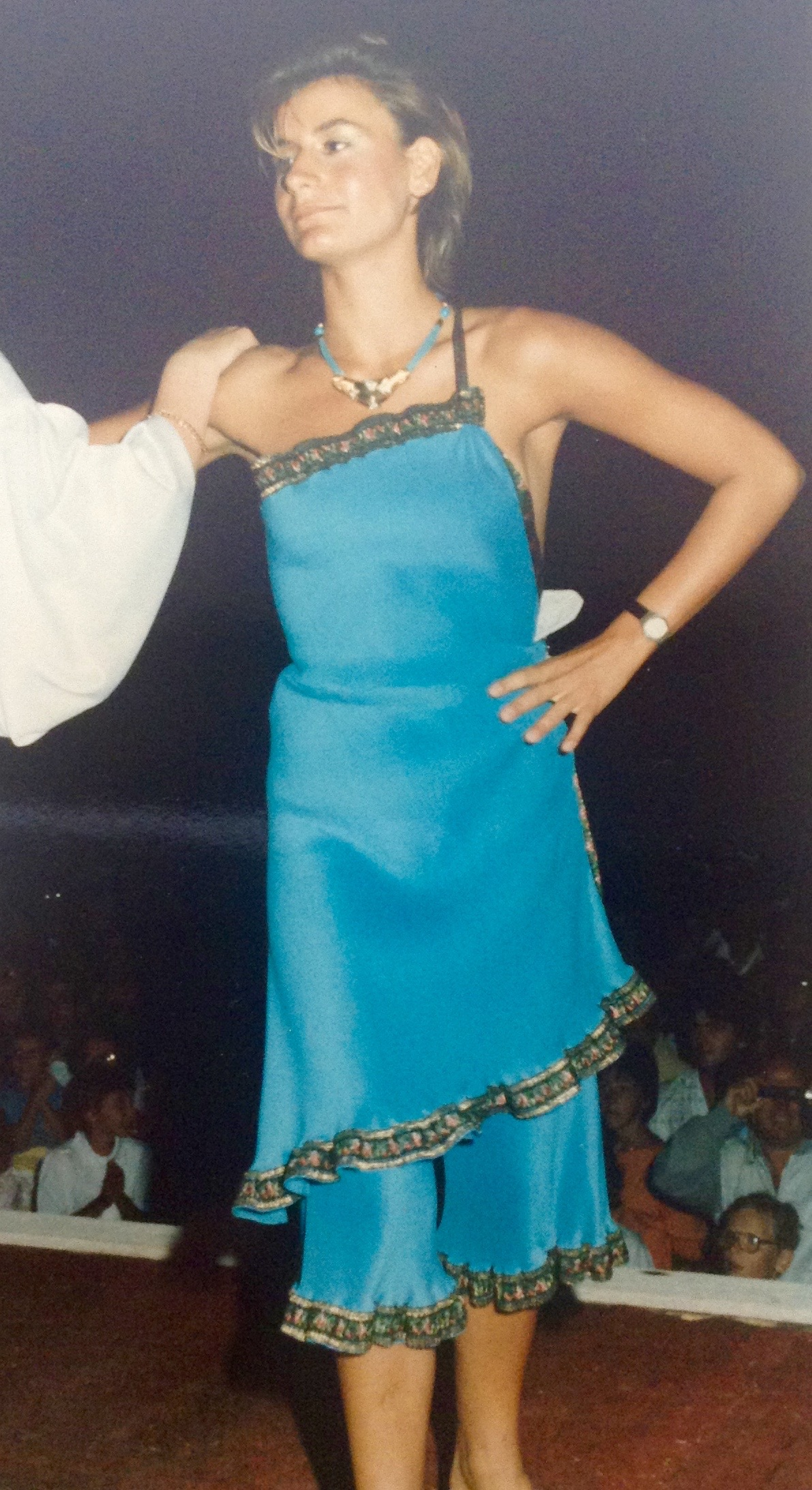
Fashion show in Baja Sardinia (1985), Creazioni Tappin

At the height of her artistic career in 1985, Valmaggia designed modern versions of the traditional Sardinian costume that were presented during fashion shows at the main squares of Cannigione and Baja Sardinia.

In the 1990s she dedicated herself to artistic ceramics making small sculptures inspired by faces of Sardinian women, tiny animals, floral compositions, as well as varied plates with marine motives that reflected topics of her paintings.

Beginning of the 21st Century was dominated by furnishing accessories in ceramics such as vases, plates and wall lamps in the marine style. In 2007 she was diagnosed brain cancer, however, even following surgery, she continued her artistic activity until death two years later.

== Gallery ==
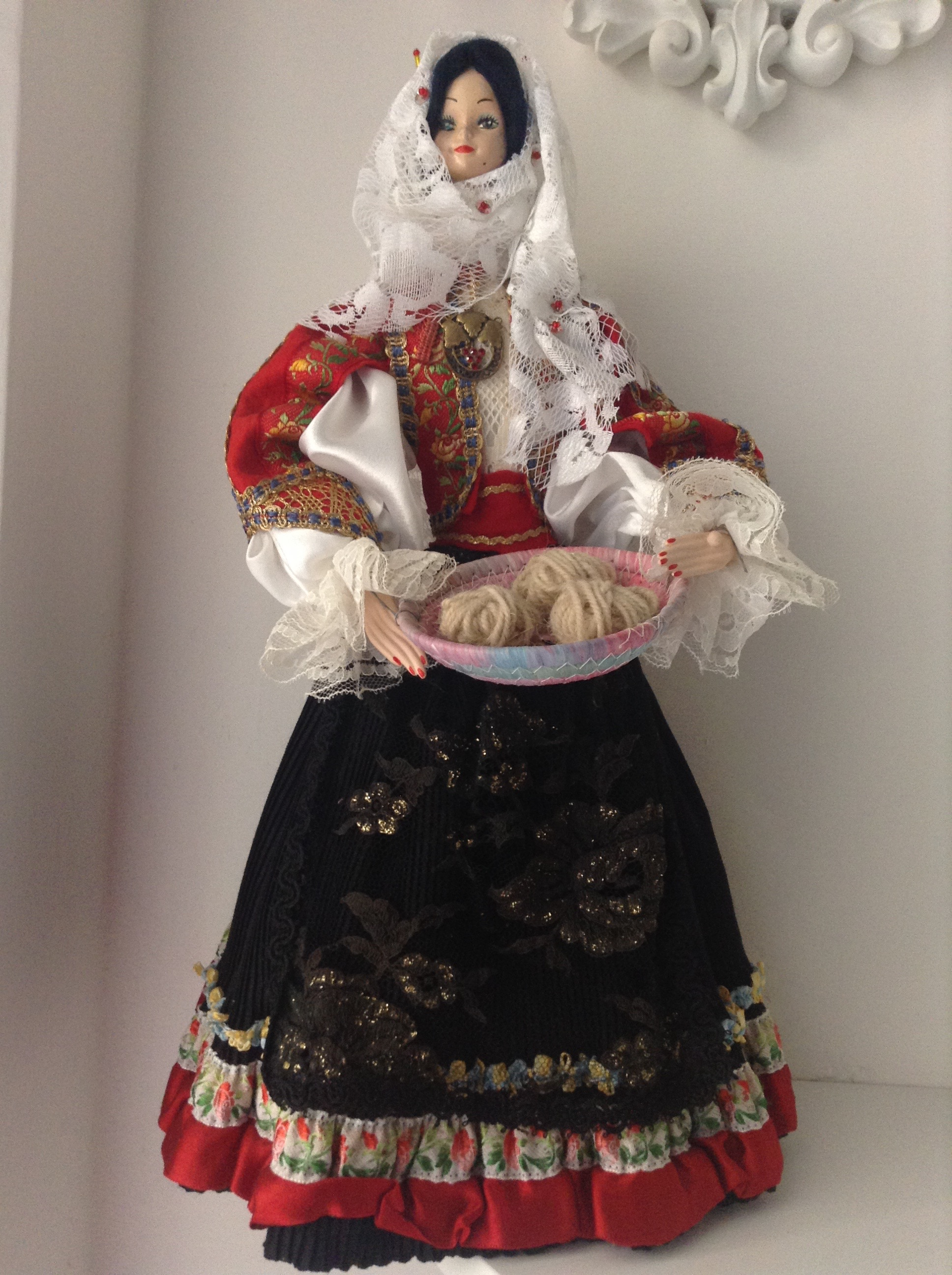
"Doll with basket" after 1982 by Vittoria Valmaggia - private collection

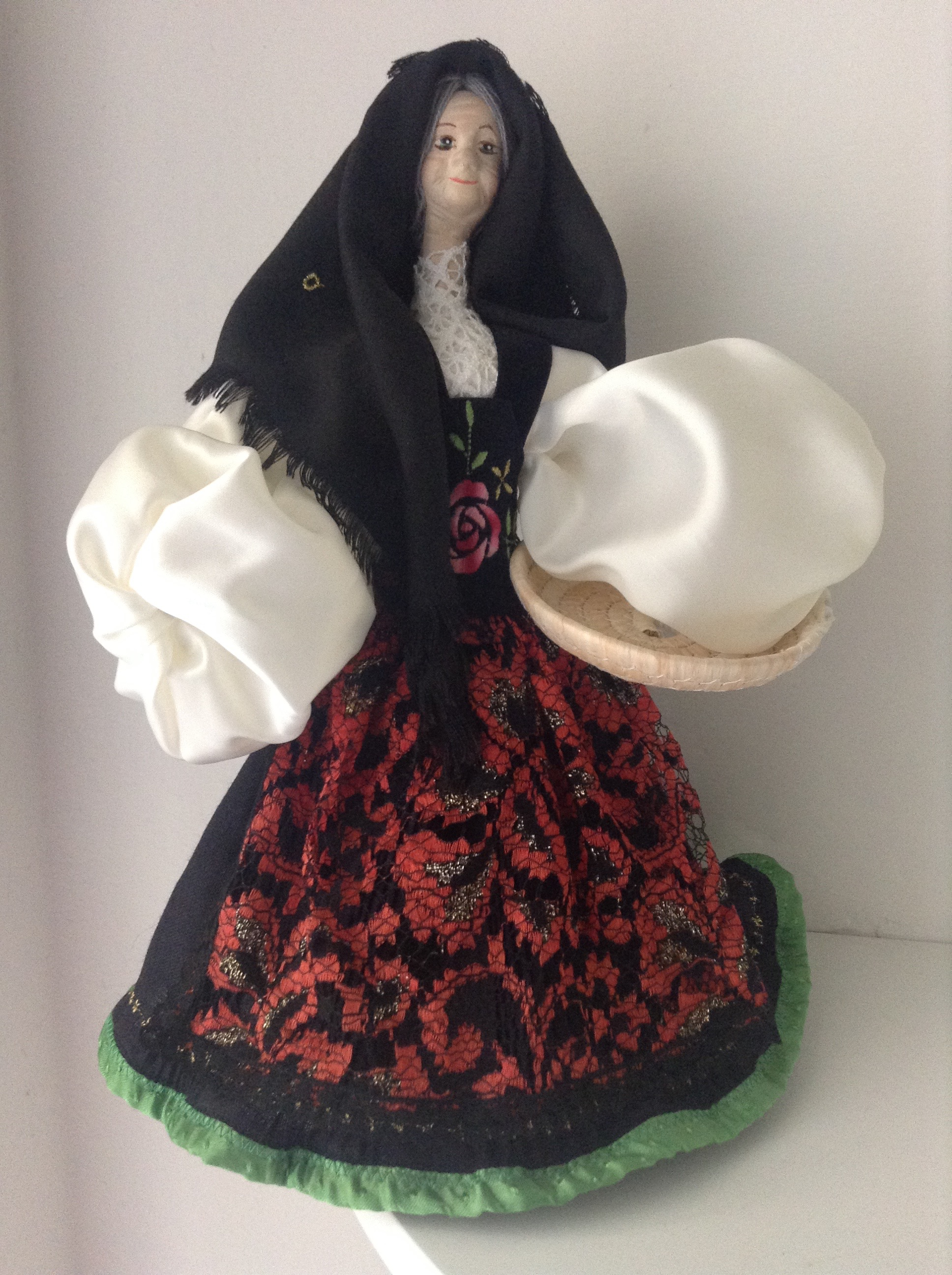
"Old woman with basket" by Vittoria Valmaggia, period after 1982 - private collection

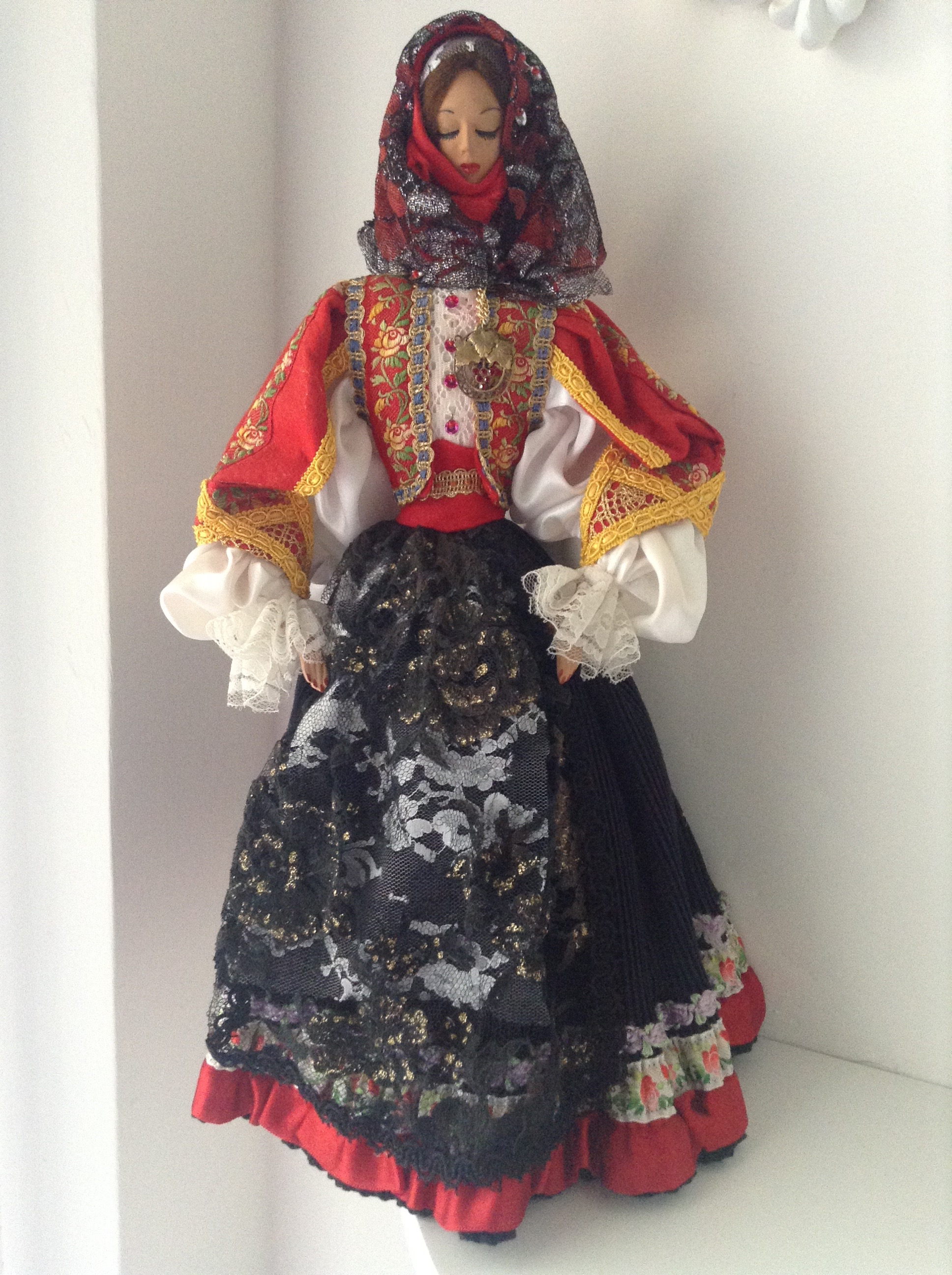
"Doll in folk costume" by Vittoria Valmaggia, period after 1982 - private collection

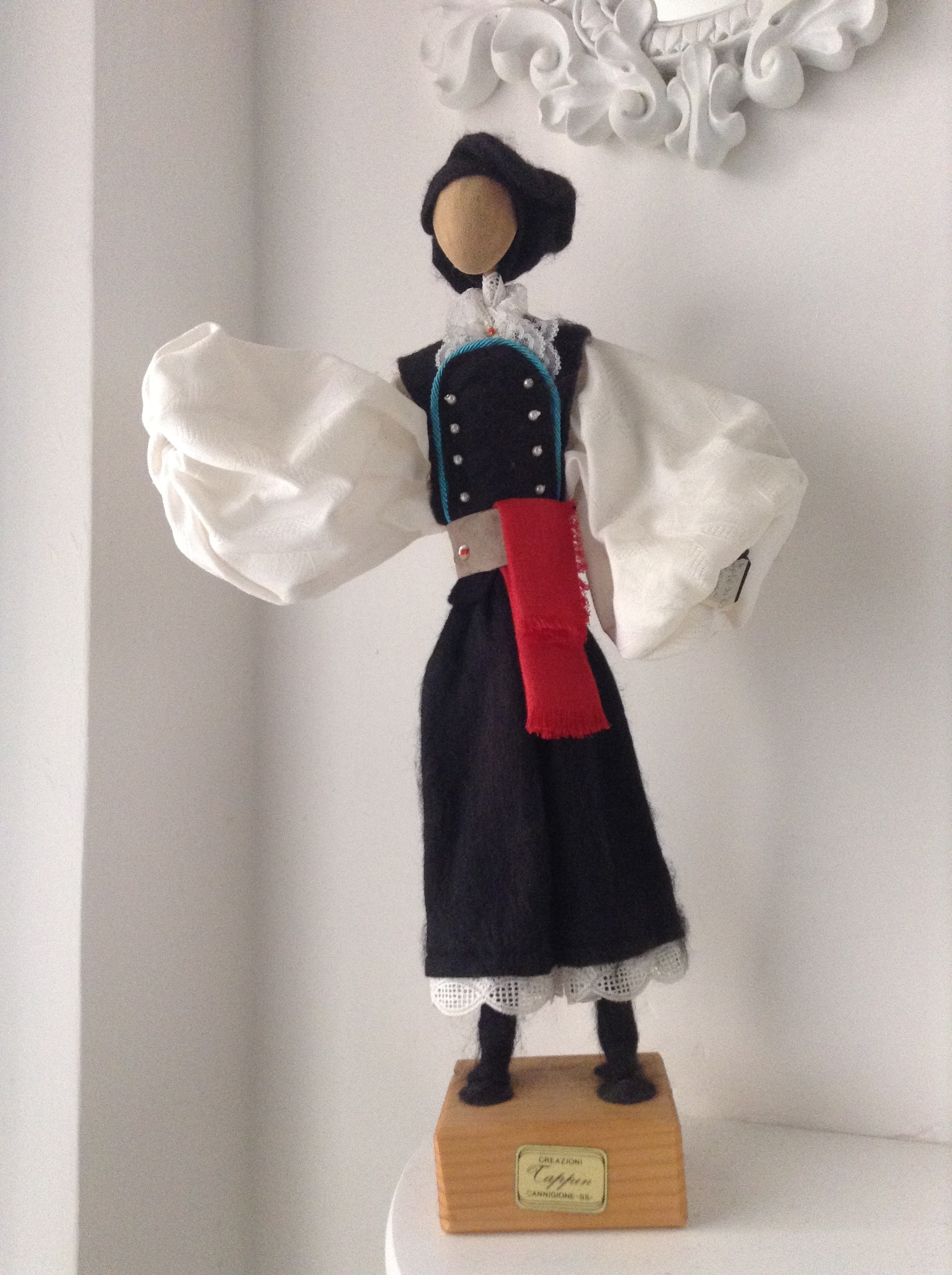
"Man in costume of Iglesias (CA)" by Vittoria Valmaggia, period before 1982 - private collection
