= Abraham da Cagliari =

8th-century rabbi

Abraham da Cagliari was a rabbi at Cagliari, Sardinia, in the eighth century. He is mentioned by Antonio di Tharros, a historian of the time, and by Delotone, in his Ritmo di Gialeto. The latter relates that Abraham interpreted many Phoenician inscriptions collected by the Sardinian king Gialeto; and the former that, together with another Jewish scholar named Canaim, he deciphered Greek and Phoenician inscriptions found in the palace of Masu.
