= Joan de Girgio Vitelli =

Italian lawyer and writer

Joan de Giorgio Vitelli i Simon (Alghero 1870 - Rome 1916) was an Italian lawyer and writer. He was a supporter of Renaixença catalana in Alghero.

He worked for Ministry of the Interior (Italy) and became prefect in Ravenna in 1913.

In 1887 he helped the archaeologist Eduard Toda and he translated to Catalan language works by Dante Alighieri, Giacomo Leopardi and Giosuè Carducci.
