= Rita Carla Francesca Monticelli =

Italian author (born 1974)

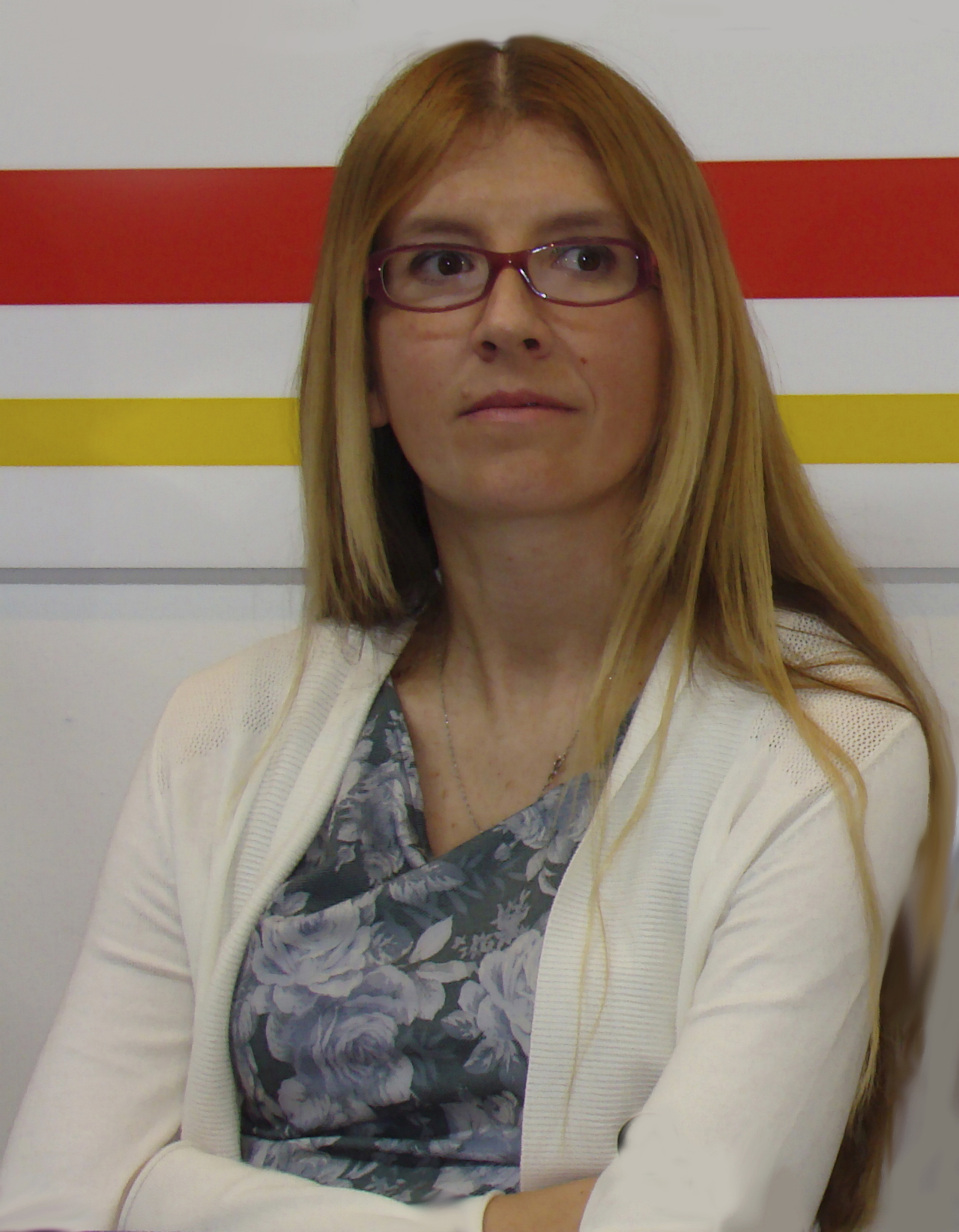
- Turin International Book Fair XXVII, 2014
- Born: November 3, 1974 (age 51); Carbonia, Italy
- Occupation: Novelist
- Writing career
- Period: 2012–present
- Genres: Thriller, Crime fiction, Science fiction
- Website: anakina.eu anakina.net

Rita Carla Francesca Monticelli is an Italian science fiction and thriller author. Born in Carbonia in 1974, she has been living in Cagliari since 1993, where she works as a writer, as well as scientific and literary translator.

== Biography ==
She has a Degree in Biological Sciences in 1998, has in the past served as a researcher, tutor and assistant professor of ecology at the Department of Animal Biology and Ecology of the University of Cagliari. Since April 2013 she is an Italian Representative of the Mars Initiative.

She wrote and published a four-book hard science fiction series set on Mars and titled "Deserto rosso" in Italian (published 2012–2013). She later translated it into English under the title Red Desert (published during 2014 and 2015). Deserto rosso omnibus published in December 2013. Thanks to this series, in 2014 she was awarded by Wired Italia as one of the 10 best Italian independent authors, was a guest at the Turin International Book Fair and at the Frankfurt Book Fair, and became a popular science fiction author in Italy.

She has also written three crime thrillers set in London, Il mentore, Sindrome, and Oltre il limite, which are book 1, 2, and 3 in the Detective Eric Shaw Trilogy. Il mentore was translated as The Mentor in English and is an international bestseller (published by AmazonCrossing). The Mentor hit #1 on the Kindle Store in the United States, UK, and Australia in October 2015, selling 200,000 copies in a matter of months.

She is a member of the International Thriller Writers Organization. This is an organization that only authors with at least one book published by a recognized publisher can join, in Monticelli's case her novel published by AmazonCrossing.

Her releases in English include Kindred Intentions, an action-packed British thriller with a romantic twist, and the two sequels to The Mentor: Syndrome and Beyond the Limit.

Between 2016–2023, Monticelli taught a class about self-publishing at the University of Insubria.

Since 2020, she is a member of the InCosmiCon research center at the University of Insubria.

== Publications ==
=== In Italian ===
- Anjce, comic book by Miriam Blasich, preface by Rita Carla Francesca Monticelli, ISBN 9788897663072 ProGlo Edizioni (2012)

Science Fiction

- Deserto rosso - Punto di non ritorno (2012)
- Deserto rosso - Abitanti di Marte (2012)
- Deserto rosso - Nemico invisibile (2013)
- Deserto rosso - Ritorno a casa (2013)
- Deserto rosso (Aurora Vol. 1) (4-book compilation of the whole series) (2013)
- L'isola di Gaia (Aurora Vol. 2) (2014)
- Per caso (2015)
- Ophir. Codice vivente (Aurora Vol. 3) (2016)
- Sirius. In caduta libera (Aurora Vol. 4) (2018)
- Nave stellare Aurora (Aurora Vol. 5) (2020)

Thrillers

- Il mentore (Detective Eric Shaw 1) (2014)
- Affinità d'intenti (2015)
- Sindrome (Detective Eric Shaw 2) (2016)
- Oltre il limite (Detective Eric Shaw 3) (2017)

Non-fiction

- Self-publishing lab. Il mestiere dell'autoeditore (2020)

=== English Translations ===
Science Fiction

- Red Desert - Point of No Return (2014)
- Red Desert - People of Mars (2014)
- Red Desert - Invisible Enemy (2015)
- Red Desert - Back Home (2015)

Thrillers

- The Mentor (2015; 2nd edition 2022)
- Kindred Intentions (2016)
- Syndrome (2023)
- Beyond the Limit (2023)

=== Scientific publications and presentations (in Italian) ===
- Interventi di bonifica e condizioni ecologiche del Canale di Terramaini, Cottiglia M., Masala M. L., Monticelli R. C., Rendiconti Seminario della Facoltà di Scienze – Università degli Studi di Cagliari, 1999.
- Interventi di bonifica nello “stagno” di Sa Praja. Caratteristiche ecologiche, Cottiglia M., Masala M. L., Monticelli C., Righini W., Seminario della Facoltà di Scienze - Università degli Studi di Cagliari, 2000.
- Impatto ambientale da piscicoltura in gabbie galleggianti nella Baia di Figari (Corsica meridionale), Cottiglia M., De Miranda M. A., Loffredo F., Masala M. L., Pergent Martini C., Pergent G. e Monticelli C., Atti del Congresso “Environnement et Identité en Méditerranée” – DRE, Université de Corse (France), 2000.
- Arricchimento organico e meiofauna bentica in un ambiente marino costiero, M. Cottiglia, M.L. Masala e C. Monticelli, Rendiconti Seminario Facoltà di Scienze - Università di Cagliari, 2001.
