= Dolores Turchi =

Italian writer

Dolores Turchi (Oliena, 1935) is an Italian writer.

Born in Oliena from a Tuscan family, Dolores Turchi was a primary school teacher. She wrote several publications about traditions and culture in Sardinia.

Since 1989 to 1991 she was director of the magazine Sardigna Antiga ("Old Sardinia" in English), since 1992 to 1995 of the magazine Sardegna Antica – culture mediterranee ("Old Sardinia - Mediterranean cultures" in English). Lately, she founded the magazine Sardegna Mediterranea ("Mediterranean Sardinia" in English). In 2003 she founded the publishing company Iris.

She has been organizer of congress about Sardinian linguistics, she taught in academic courses about Sardinian culture and traditions, and in 2004 she was rewarded for essay writing during the Sardinian literature festival in Bono and in 2009 during the Amistade prize in Olbia. In 2007 she was rewarded of the prize in journalism "Funtana Elighe" in Silanus.

== Bibliography ==
- Turchi, Dolores (1977). Oliena... Barbagia... Sardegna... (in Italian). Nuoro: La tipografica Solinas.
- Lostia, Menica; Catte, Maria Paola; Sanna, Nuccia (1990). Turchi, Dolores (ed.). Dalla culla alla bara: raccolta di antiche ninnenanne, canti, attitos e proverbi (in Italian). Nuoro: Arti Grafiche AR.P.E.F.
- Turchi, Dolores (1990). Maschere, miti e feste della Sardegna (in Italian). Roma: Newton Compton Editori. ISBN 978-88-541-2345-8.
- Turchi, Dolores (1992). Samugheo: il fascino delle più arcaiche tradizioni della Sardegna centrale attraverso la storia, i racconti, le leggende e le preghiere del paese sul quale aleggia ancora il mistero del castello di Medusa (in Italian). Roma: Newton Compton Editori. ISBN 88-7983-025-2.
- Deledda, Grazia (1995). Turchi, Dolores (ed.). Sangue sardo e altri racconti (in Italian). Roma: Newton Compton Editori. ISBN 88-8183-089-2.
- Deledda, Grazia (1995). Turchi, Dolores (ed.). Leggende sarde (in Italian). Roma: Newton Compton Editori. ISBN 88-8183-002-7.
- Spano, Giovanni (1997). Turchi, Dolores (ed.). Proverbi sardi (in Italian). Roma: Newton Compton Editori. ISBN 88-8183-360-3.
- Turchi, Dolores (2001). Lo sciamanesimo in Sardegna (in Italian). Roma: Newton Compton Editori. ISBN 88-8289-549-1.
- Turchi, Dolores (2004). Preghiere e scongiuri della tradizione popolare sarda in logudorese e campidanese (in Italian). Oliena: Iris. ISBN 88-89187-04-2.
- Turchi, Dolores (2004). Max Leopold Wagner lingua e cultura sarda: atti del Convegno internazionale di linguistica sarda: Oliena 23 marzo 2003 (in Italian). Oliena: Iris. ISBN 88-89187-02-6.
- Turchi, Dolores (2007). Nughedu Santa Vittoria: un paese custode delle tradizioni (in Italian). Oliena: Iris. ISBN 978-88-89187-14-2.
- Turchi, Dolores; Concas, Paolina (2008). Ho visto agire s'accabadora (in Italian). Oliena: Iris. ISBN 978-88-89187-17-3.
- Turchi, Dolores, ed. (2008). Il culto dei morti in Sardegna e nel bacino del Mediterraneo: atti dei cinque Convegni tenutisi a Fordongianus dal 2003 al 2007 (in Italian). Oliena: Iris. ISBN 978-88-89187-16-6.
- Turchi, Dolores (2011). Leggende e racconti popolari della Sardegna (in Italian). Roma: Newton Compton Editori. ISBN 978-88-541-2397-7.
- Deledda, Grazia (2011). Turchi, Dolores (ed.). Tradizioni popolari di Sardegna (in Italian). Roma: Newton Compton Editori. ISBN 978-88-541-2750-0.
- Turchi, Dolores; Dettori, Lina; Angelone, Juana (2011). Intervista a Grazia Deledda e altri racconti (in Italian). Oliena: Iris. ISBN 978-88-89187-23-4.
