= Mariano Garau =

Italian composer

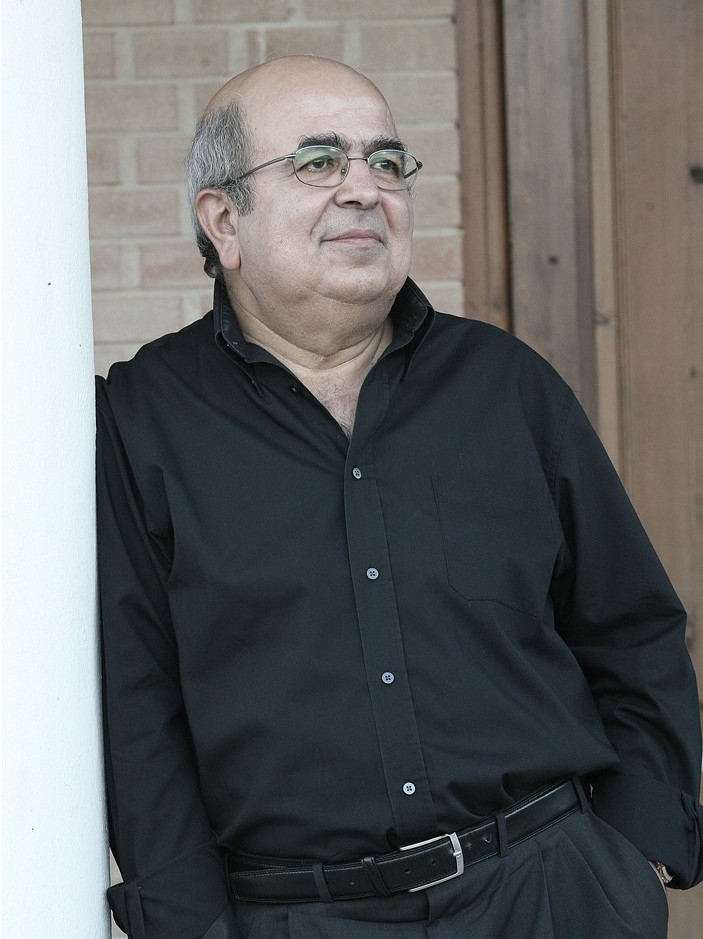
- Born: 14 March 1952 (age 74); Iglesias
- Occupations: Composer, conductor
- Website: marianogarau.org

Mariano Garau (1952) is an Italian contemporary composer.

== Early life ==
He was born in Iglesias, a medieval city of Sardinia, Italy. He devoted himself to music under the guidance of composer Pietro Allori and studied harmony and counterpoint with Rodolfo Cicionesi in Florence.

== Music ==
He wrote romances for soprano and tenor, children songs, masses and motets for choir. Across forty years of artistic activity he directed many choirs.

His recordings include "The Lamentations of Jeremiah" by Thomas Tallis and the "Missa Pange lingua" by Josquin des Prez. For the Jubilee Year, he recorded the "Responsorii della Settimana Santa" by Tomás Luis de Victoria. He collaborated with the Banda Sinfonica Stanislaus Silesu for performance and recording (national premiere) of the Requiem by Frigyes Hidas at the Teatro Comunale in Cagliari.

In February 1999 he recorded twenty-four of his compositions in collaboration with Centro Universitario Musicale di Cagliari. In 2000 he won important awards in Rome. His works became part of the repertoire of numerous Italian and foreign choirs. He often collaborated with writer and music critic Natalia Di Bartolo.

As a composer and choir conductor Garau worked to preserve Sardinian music heritage and of a language variant, the "Campidanese", based on lyrics by local poets. Recordings of pieces composed and directed by him and performed by "Coro di Iglesias" were included in the multimedia section of the "Enciclopedia della musica sarda".

Garau's compositions include sacred choral music, both in Latin and Italian, mostly published by Tagliabue Editore. Music for children's choirs is also present, and included, as an example, in the DVD named Nastri di parole per girotondi di pace published by the Amnesty International group of Sassari.

Di Bartolo asserts that Garau employs a unique philological subtlety in composition and execution, showing careful preparation along with passionate study of his favourite sacred themes.

Works by Mariano Garau have been performed by choirs worldwide, such as the chamber choir Vox Gaudiosa] (Japan), the Vocaal Kwartet Quartz (The Netherlands), and the Pueri cantores Sancti Nicolai (Poland).

== Recordings ==
- Polifonia Sacra – Cappella Musicale Pietro Allori
- I misteri della passione
- Madre nostra
- O magnum mysterium on YouTube, performed by the University Choir of Pingtung (China)
- Notte di Natale on YouTube, performed by "Cappella Musicale Pietro Allori" (Italy)
- Adoro Te devote on YouTube, performed by "Cappella Musicale Pietro Allori" (Italy)
- O Jesu mi dulcissime on YouTube, performed by "Cappella Musicale Pietro Allori" (Italy)
