= Daniele Soro =

Italian basketball player (born 1975)

No. 1 – Olimpia Cagliari
- Position: Point guard
- League: Serie A1

Personal information
- Born: October 8, 1975 (age 51) Cagliari
- Listed height: 203 cm (6 ft 8 in)

Daniele Soro (born October 18, 1975) is a professional Italian basketball player.
