= Vico Mossa =

Italian architect and writer

Vico Mossa (Serramanna, October 15, 1914 – Sassari, March 23, 2003) was an Italian architect and writer. He is best known for his buildings in Sassari, notably the restoration of the Teatro Civico, Palazzo Bosazza, Hotel Turritana, Palazzo dell'Upim, Chiesa di San Vincenzo, and Collegio Marianum on the Piazza Duomo. He was the author of many works on local and Sardinian architecture.

== Publications ==
- Vico Mossa, Novecento, stile sardo e così via : problemi di architettura in Sardegna. Sassari, Il Rosello, 1946
- Vico Mossa, Architettura religiosa minore in Sardegna. Sassari, Tipografia Gallizzi, 1953
- Vico Mossa, L'istituto statale d'arte per la Sardegna, Sassari. Felice Le Monnier, 1954
- Vico Mossa, Architettura domestica in Sardegna : contributo per una storia della casa mediterranea. Cagliari, La Zattera, 1957 e Sassari, Carlo Delfino, 1985
- Vico Mossa, Dai nuraghi alla rinascita. Sassari, Tipografia Gallizzi, 1961
- Vico Mossa, Architettura quotidiana. Sassari, Edizioni di Ichnusa, 1961
- Vico Mossa, I cabilli. Cagliari, La Zattera, 1965
- Vico Mossa, Architetture sassaresi. Sassari, Tipografia Gallizzi, 1965 e Sassari, Carlo Delfino Editore, 1988
- Vico Mossa, Almanacco di Sardegna. Sassari, Dessì, 1973
- Vico Mossa, Natura e civiltà in Sardegna: guida in cento schede ai beni ambientali e culturali. Sassari, Tipografia Chiarella, 1979
- Vico Mossa, Architettura e paesaggio in Sardegna. Sassari, Carlo Delfino Editore, 1981
- Vico Mossa, Dal gotico al barocco in Sardegna. Sassari, Carlo Delfino Editore, 1982
- Vico Mossa, Artigianato sardo. Sassari, Carlo Delfino Editore, 1983
- Vico Mossa, Temi d'arte e d'ambiente in Sardegna. Sassari, Carlo Delfino Editore, 1987
- Vico Mossa, Coi maestri d'arte e di muro. Sassari, Carlo Delfino Editore, 1989
- Vico Mossa, Luna & Sole : curiosità edilizie di Sassari. Sassari, Carlo Delfino Editore, 1991
- Vico Mossa, Vicende dell'architettura in Sardegna. Sassari, Carlo Delfino Editore, 1994
