= Sebastian Piras =

Italian photographer and filmmaker

Sebastian Piras is a photographer and filmmaker from Italy.

Sebastian has lived in Italy, England, France and Germany before settling in New York City in 1985.

His main photographic subject has been portraiture. His exhibition "Artists Exposed" contains a collection of captivating portraits of known artists, such as Andy Warhol and Roy Lichtenstein, and lesser-known ones. David Ross, former director of the Whitney Museum of American Art, who wrote the preface for the book Artists Exposed, heralded Piras' photos as: "probing and extraordinarily beautiful portraits of artists . . . that ultimately produce winners at both ends of the camera."

His photographs have been published, exhibited and collected worldwide. He has worked in film as a cameraman/steadicam operator and director. He has directed and filmed documentaries, including "Taylor Mead Unleashed", which also featured Allen Ginsberg and Quentin Crisp.

== Books ==
- Piras, Sebastiano. Artists exposed: Ritratti fotografici di Sebastiano Piras. Testi di Anna Maria Montaldo, David A. Ross, Paul Brach. [Cagliari, Italy]: Comune di Cagliari, Assessorato alla cultura, c1996.

"A Pocketful of Contemporary Artists Portraits", Published by images, Melbourne 2008
