= Francesco Manunta =

Francesco Manunta, in Catalan language, Francesc Manunta i Baldino (1928 in Alghero – 1995) was an Italian priest and poet.

== Early life ==
From 1965 to 1983, he was missionary in Brazil. When he went back to Alghero, he started his activity to promote Catalan language in Alghero. He was president of Òmnium Cultural in Alghero and he received the Creu de Sant Jordi in 1990.

== Works ==
- Catecisme alguerès (1964) with Josep Sanna
- Les veus (1970)
- Aigües vives (1976)
- Llavors de llum (1981)
- Miques de mirall (1988)
- Transparències (1991)
- Cançons i líriques religioses de l'Alguer catalana (1990)
