= Ludovico Baille =

Sardinian lawyer and historian (1764–1839)

- Born: February 3, 1764; Cagliari, Sardinia
- Died: March 14, 1839 (aged 75); Cagliari, Sardinia
- Education: Reale Università di Cagliari
- Occupations: Lawyer, historian
- Writing career
- Notable works: Il sigillo dei bassi tempi; Iscrizioni latine

Ludovico Baille (Cagliari February 3, 1764 – Cagliari March 14, 1839) was a Sardinian lawyer and historian.

Having graduated in law from the Reale Università di Cagliari he was appointed in 1786 to the Ministry of the Spanish government at Turin, but his chief interest was in tracking down in archives and libraries the materials that would serve him for a planned history of his native Sardinia, which remains in manuscript.

In 1800, he returned to Sardinia and continued his research. He was an active member of the Royal Society of Agriculture and Economics and president of the University library, while he held official posts as censor and assistant to the reform magistracy. A member of various academies, he maintained correspondence with many of the Italian scholars of his day: Mattei, Marini, Vernazza, and Angius. In the last decade of the 18th century, Baille was the guiding spirit behind the institution at Cagliari of a museum of antiquities and of natural history.

His papers, both edited and unedited, constitute one of the important sources for the study of Sardinian history. In his spare time he composed sonnets.

The Baille archives are at the Biblioteca Universitaria di Cagliari. They include a parchment codex containing the acts of the Sardinian synod held at Santa Giusta, November 3, 1226 and the 16th-century manuscript of Giovanni Proto Arca's seven books of the natural and moral history of Sardinia (Naturalis et moralis historiae de rebus Sardiniae, libri septem), among other documents.

His published works include:

- Il sigillo dei bassi tempi, Torino, 1797.
- Il sigillo secondo dei bassi tempi, Torino, 1800.
- Iscrizioni latine, Cagliari, 1821, 1831, 1832, 1830.
- Sonetti, Cagliari, 1784-89-93. 1803-7-12-16-22-23-24-26-27-31.

Also in manuscript are his notes on economics, a dissertation on Sardinia, records of his voyages in 1788–89, and notes on antiquities.
