= Pasqual Scanu =

Italian educator and writer

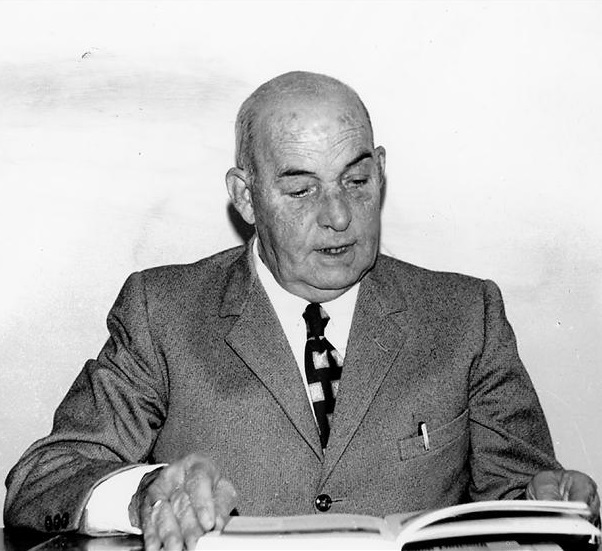
Pasqual Scanu

Pasqual Scanu (1908 in Alghero – 1978 in Sassari) was an Italian educator and writer in Catalan and Italian.

He studied in Rome and was a school teacher and later a school director in the province of Sassari (1937–1975). He was very interested in Catalan culture in Alghero and took part in almost all Catalan Floral Games since 1959.

== Works ==
- Alghero e la Catalogna (1962)
- Pervivència de la llengua catalana oficial a l'Alguer (1964)
- Sardegna (1964)
- Sardegna nostra (1970)
- Poesia d'Alguer (1970)
- Guida di Alghero (1971)
- Rondalles alguereses (1985)
