= Francesco Alziator =

Italian writer and journalist (1909–1977)

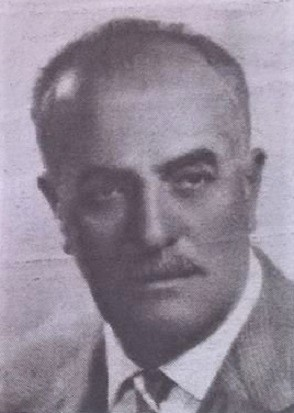
Francesco Alziator

Francesco Alziator (1909, in Cagliari – 1977) was an Italian writer and journalist. He was concerned for much of his career with the preservation of traditional Sardinian culture, mainly of is hometown Cagliari.

== Biography ==
Alziator was born into an aristocratic and monarchical family on 12 March 1909. His father Mario was consul of Holland. He graduated in literature in 1932 and, two years later, in political science. In 1928 he published his first article, Prefices and funeral songs, on The Sardinian Union; in the same year he began to collaborate with the Mediterranean magazine. For years a convinced fascist, was part of the cultural organization G.U.F. (Fascist University Youth).

== Works ==
- L'Elefante sulla torre. Itinerario cagliaritano, 1979-1982
- Attraverso i sentieri della memoria, 1979
- I giorni della laguna, 1977 (Studies about the Lagoon of Santa Gilla near Cagliari)
- Verso la storia dell'abbigliamento popolare in Sardegna, 1964
- La città del sole, 1963 (about his hometown Cagliari)
- Picaro e folklore e altri saggi di storia delle tradizioni popolari, 1959
- Il Folclore Sardo, Cagliari, 1957.
- Storiografia della tradizioni popolari di Sardegna, 1957
- Storia della letteratura di Sardegna, 1954
