= Giovanni Francesco Fara =

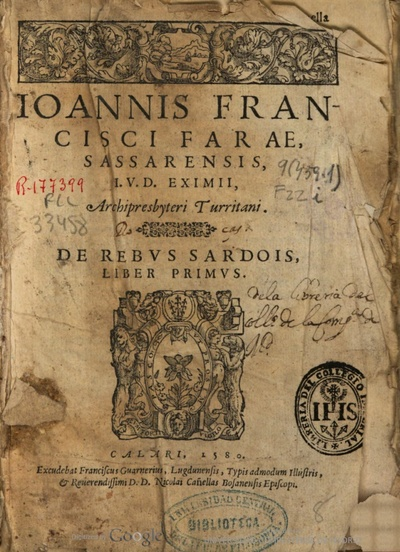
- De rebus Sardois liber primus, Cagliari, 1580.
- Born: February 4, 1543 Sassari
- Died: 1591 (aged 47–48) Bosa
- Occupation: Historian

Giovanni Francesco Fara (February 4, 1543 - 1591) was a Sardinian historian, geographer and clergyman, who wrote in Latin.

== Biography ==
Giovanni Francesco Fara, the son of a solicitor, was born into one of the most illustrious families in Sassari. His early studies were done in Sardinia, and then moved to Italy where he studied law and philosophy at the Collegio di Spagna, an institution for the Spanish students in the city of Bologna; he also attended the lectures of the jurist Camillo Porzio. He collected information for his writings in Pisa, Florence, Bologna and Rome. He was appointed Archpriest of the Cathedral of Sassari on December 6, 1568. He was appointed Bishop of Bosa in 1591, and died there the same year. His large library was donated to the University of Cagliari. Fara is considered the "father of Sardinian historiography".

== Works ==
- Tractatus de essentia infantis, proximi infantiae et proximi pubertatis (1567)
- De rebus sardois (four books, the first published in 1580, the rest in 1835)
- De corographia Sardiniae (unpublished until the nineteenth century)
