= Pasquale Tola =

Italian judge, academic and politician

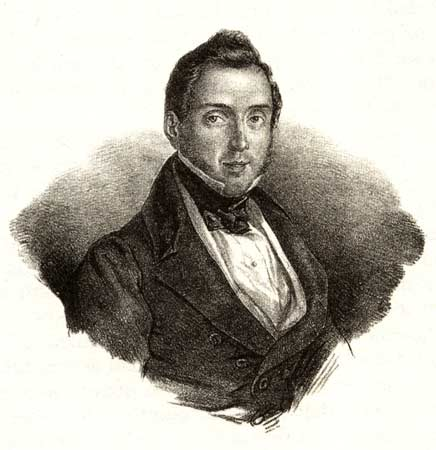

Pasquale Tola (30 November 1800 in Sassari – 25 August 1874 in Genoa) was an Italian judge, politician and historian.

Issue of an ancient and noble Sardinian family, he studied in Sassari, where he obtained a degree in theology and law and also followed courses in philosophy and fine arts. In 1848 he was part of the ministerial working group in Sardinia. He was in favour of the abolition of feudalism in Sardinia. He wrote many works on historical-political topics, particularly about Sardinia, and there is extensive literary coverage of him. Tola was also an encyclopedian, and authored a Dictionary of Sardinian Biography in 1837–38. He was then chancellor of the University of Sassari. Later he worked in the judiciary at the courts of appeal in Nice and Genoa. He was a member of the Sardinian parliament in Turin from 1848, and then the national one.

In Sassari the Piazza Tola in the historical centre is named after him. In Rome, Via Pasquale Tola is located in a central area near the Via Appia, while in Cagliari the Via Pasquale Tola is located near the central Via P. Paoli and the Via Dante.

== Works ==
- Pasquale Tola, Dizionario biografico degli uomini illustri di Sardegna, ossia Storia della vita pubblica e privata di tutti i sardi che si distinsero per opere, azioni, talenti, virtù e delitti, opera del cav. don Pasquale Tola. (3 voll.), Torino : Tipografia Chirio e Mina, 1837–1838. Vol. II , Vol III
- Pasquale Tola, Codice diplomatico di Sardegna con altri documenti storici, raccolto, ordinato ed illustrato dal cav. Don Pasquale Tola. (2 voll.) Torino : Chirio e Mina, 1845
- Pasquale Tola, Codice degli statuti della repubblica di Sassari, Edito e illustrato dal cav. Don Pasquale Tola. Cagliari, A. Timon, 1850

== Bibliography ==
- Vittorio Finzi, Pasquale Tola nella vita e nelle opere : notizie biobibliografiche , Sassari : Tip. ditta Giacomo Chiarella, 1911
