= Salvatore Alepus =

Spanish Roman Catholic archbishop (1503–1568)

- Church: Catholic
- Archdiocese: Sassari
- Installed: January 29, 1524
- Term ended: 1568

Personal details
- Born: Salvatore Alepus; 1503 Morella, Castellón
- Died: 1568 (aged 64–65) Sassari, Sardinia
- Denomination: Roman Catholic
- Parents: Gabriel and Catherine Manca-Pilo

Salvatore Alepus (or Salvator Salapusj) (1503 in Morella, Castellón – 1568 in Sardinia) was a Spanish Roman Catholic archbishop, who ruled the archdiocese of Sassari in the sixteenth century.

== Biography ==
He was the son of the nobles Gabriel and Catherine Manca-Pilo. He was educated at Valencia, and was still quite young when he received the title of Archbishop of Sassari on January 29, 1524. In 1532, he became embroiled in a trial, based on suspicion of being the murderer of a priest sent to Sardinia by Cardinal Alessandro Cesarini. He received the Pallium, an ecclesiastical vestment, in 1539.

The reluctance of local clergy to accept the young prelate may have been shown when they immediately surrounded him with a court of scholars, lawyers, and artists, including: the poets Angelo Simone Figo, Gavino Sugner, Gavino Sassurello, Gerolamo Araolla, Pietro Delitala and Gerolamo Delitala Vidin; Antonio Lo Frasso, writer and poet; Pier Michele Giagaraccio, scholar, lawyer, professor, and poet; Giovanni Francesco Fara, historian and jurist; Geronimo Olives, a lawyer; Giovanni del Giglio, a painter; and Alessio Fontana, a lawyer and secretary of the emperor.

== Conflict ==
Among the causes of discontent in the Alepus' curia was the question of royal patronage, which had changed the relationship between secular and ecclesiastical power. The conflict between the chapters and the archbishop lasted throughout his long episcopate, resulting in a formal lawsuit against the bishop on November 18, 1550.

There were also conflicts related to administrative issues, which, until that time were canonical jurisdiction, but that Alepus had entrusted to an outsider, Bernardino Manconi. Despite these conflicts, the chapter rewarded Alepus with 1100 gold florins after the death of his mother in 1553 - in sussidio de grandes despensas ch’at suffertu in sa residentia ch’at fattu in su conziliu tridentinu.

== Writings ==
The philosopher Gavino Sambigucci dedicated his work written for the reopening of the Accademia Bocchiana in Bologna in 1556 to Alepus. Alepus participated in the Council of Trent, which launched major reforms of the Church. He died in Sardinia, after leading the diocese for 44 years.

Alepus was a great theologian and poet. In 1532, he published Homilia in Libellum certaminis beatorum martyrum Gavini, Proti et Ianuari. He also wrote Oratio in Concilio Tridentino habita.
