= Pietro Delitala =

- Born: middle of the sixteenth century Bosa
- Died: 1613; Bosa
- Occupation: Poet

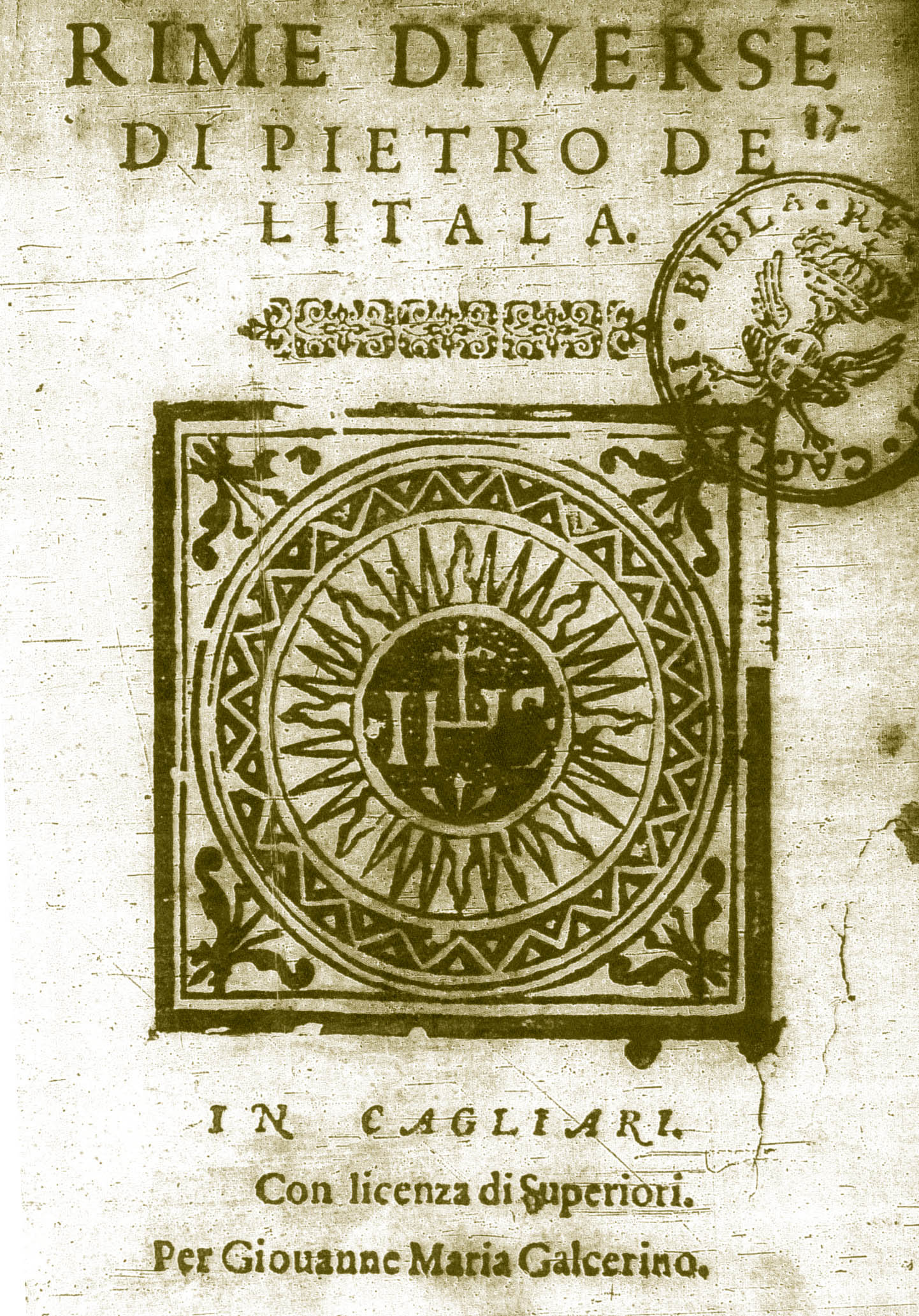
Frontispiece of "Rime Diverse", 1596

Pietro Delitala was the first Sardinian poet to write in Italian. His work was greatly influenced by Torquato Tasso, and the Sardinian poets Gerolamo Araolla and Gavino Sugner.

== Biography ==
Pietro Delitala's father, Nicholas was the mayor of Bosa in 1556. His mother, Sybil Dessena, was discussed in Anthony Lo Frasso's book Diez libros de fortuna d'Amor in 1575.

Delitala was indicted in 1572 and taken into prison, possibly for a crime associated with vengeance. He was acquitted by a parliamentary committee in 1573. In 1583, he participated in the General Parliament. He sent his brother Agostino Angelo as his delegate. In 1589, Delitala was again imprisoned, this time under the Inquisition, which imposed a fine of 5,600 Sardinian lire upon him. He left prison in 1590 through the intervention of his friend the historian Giovanni Francesco Fara.

In 1593, he was summoned to Parliament, and sent Ramon de Cetrilla as his delegate. He married around 1595 and had 5 children: Agostino Angelo, Giovanni Geronimo, Pietro, Diego and Francesco.

== Rime Diverse ==
In the spring and summer of 1594, Delitala was a guest of the Marquis Spinola in Genoa. He then went to the Sanctuary of Vicoforte near Mondovì on pilgrimage. In Rime Diverse, a book of poetry in Italian published by Galcerino Cagliari in 1596, he describes this pilgrimage, and also a miracle in Bosa in December 1594, when the Genoese captain Pàtron Natteri rescued a Codrongianosian who tried to cross the flooded Temo river on horseback.
