= Demuro =

Demuro is a surname. Notable people with the surname include:

- Cristian Demuro (born 1992), Italian jockey
- Doug DeMuro (born 1988), American car reviewer
- Francesco Demuro (born 1978), Italian operatic tenor
- Toni Demuro (born 1974), Italian illustrator
