= Republic of Sassari =

Italian state in Sardinia (1259–1323)

Free Municipality of Sassari Lìberu Comunu de Tàtari (Sardinian)
- 1259–1275 (de facto); 1275–1323 (de jure)
- Flag Coat of arms

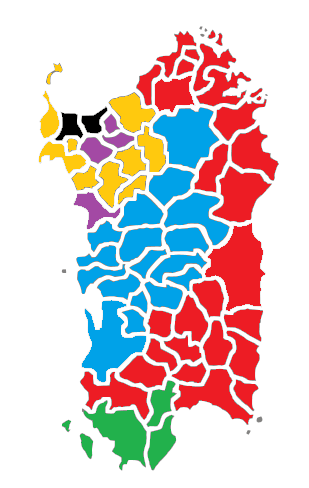
- In black the possessions of the Republic of Sassari within Sardinia.
- Status: Dependency of the Republic of Pisa 1275-1293; Independent city-state 1293-1323
- Capital: Sassari
- Common languages: Logudorese Sardinian; Tuscan-Sassarese varieties Ligurian
- Religion: Roman Catholicism
- Government: Republic
- History
  - Death of Adelasia of Torres: 1259
  - Assassination of Michele Zanche: 1275
  - Battle of Meloria: 6 August 1284
  - Peace of Fucecchio: 1293
  - Vassalised by the Crown of Aragon: 13 July 1323

Population
  - Estimate: 15-16,000
Preceded by	Succeeded by
Judicate of Logudoro	Crown of Aragon; Kingdom of Sardinia

The Free Municipality of Sassari or Republic of Sassari was a state in the region of Sassari in Sardinia during the 13th and 14th centuries, confederated first with the Republic of Pisa as a semi-autonomous subject and later with the Republic of Genoa as a nominally independent ally. It was the first and only independent city-state of Sardinia during the early renaissance.

== History ==
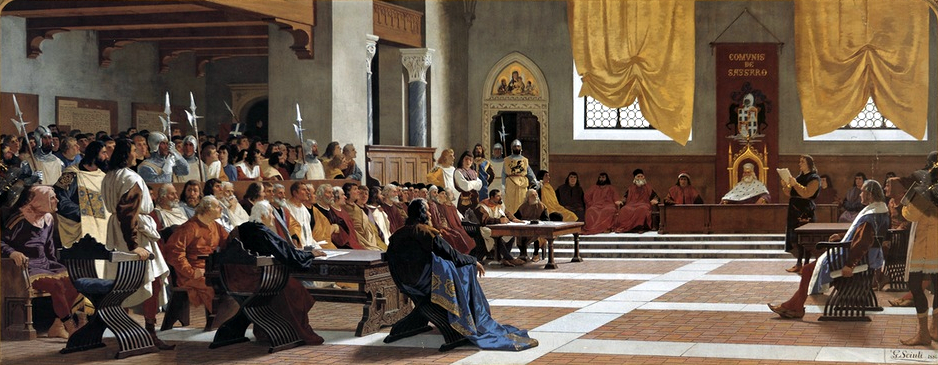
Proclamation of the Free Municipality of Sassari, Giuseppe Sciuti, 1880, Palazzo della Provincia in Sassari

According to Francesco Cesare Casula, the republic was founded in 1272 after the death of Enzo of Sardinia. Enzo had been married to Adelasia of Torres, the final ruler or judge of the Judicate of Torres, of which Sassari was the capital and most populous city in its later years. With the death of Adelasia without an heir in 1259, the judicate was divided between the Genoese Doria and Malaspina families and the ruling family of Arborea. Sassari however, persisted as a separate polity, nominally under the rule of Enzo. With Enzo's death in Bologna, Michele Zanche usurped power and ruled in the city, and is sometimes considered an unofficial judge of Torres. Zanche himself was later assassinated on the orders of his son-in-law Branca Doria in 1275 during a banquet in the Nurra.

In the first phase of Sassarese autonomy, Sassari was ruled by a podestà of Pisan allegiance, entreated by the municipality to govern them with "justice, objectivity and impartiality". However, following the disastrous Battle of Meloria in 1284 and the subsequent Peace of Fucecchio agreed in 1293, Sassari officially seceded as a nominally independent city-state, though in practice under the political influence of Genoa, which appointed a new podestà held up by Ligurian officials.

It was around this time that Sassari produced its code of law known as the Statutes of Sassari (Italian: Statuti Sassaresi), which was maintained and updated even during the later conquest of the city by the Judicate of Arborea, long after the dissolution of the republic.

After the arrival of the then-infante Alfonso IV of Aragon at the head of a fleet of 300 of his father's ships, Sassari offered to renounce its independence and become a vassal of the newly formed Kingdom of Sardinia and Corsica, then a possession of the Crown of Aragon, through the ambassador Guantino Catoni; this was accepted, and Sassari handed over authority officially on 4 July 1323.

== Statutes of Sassari ==
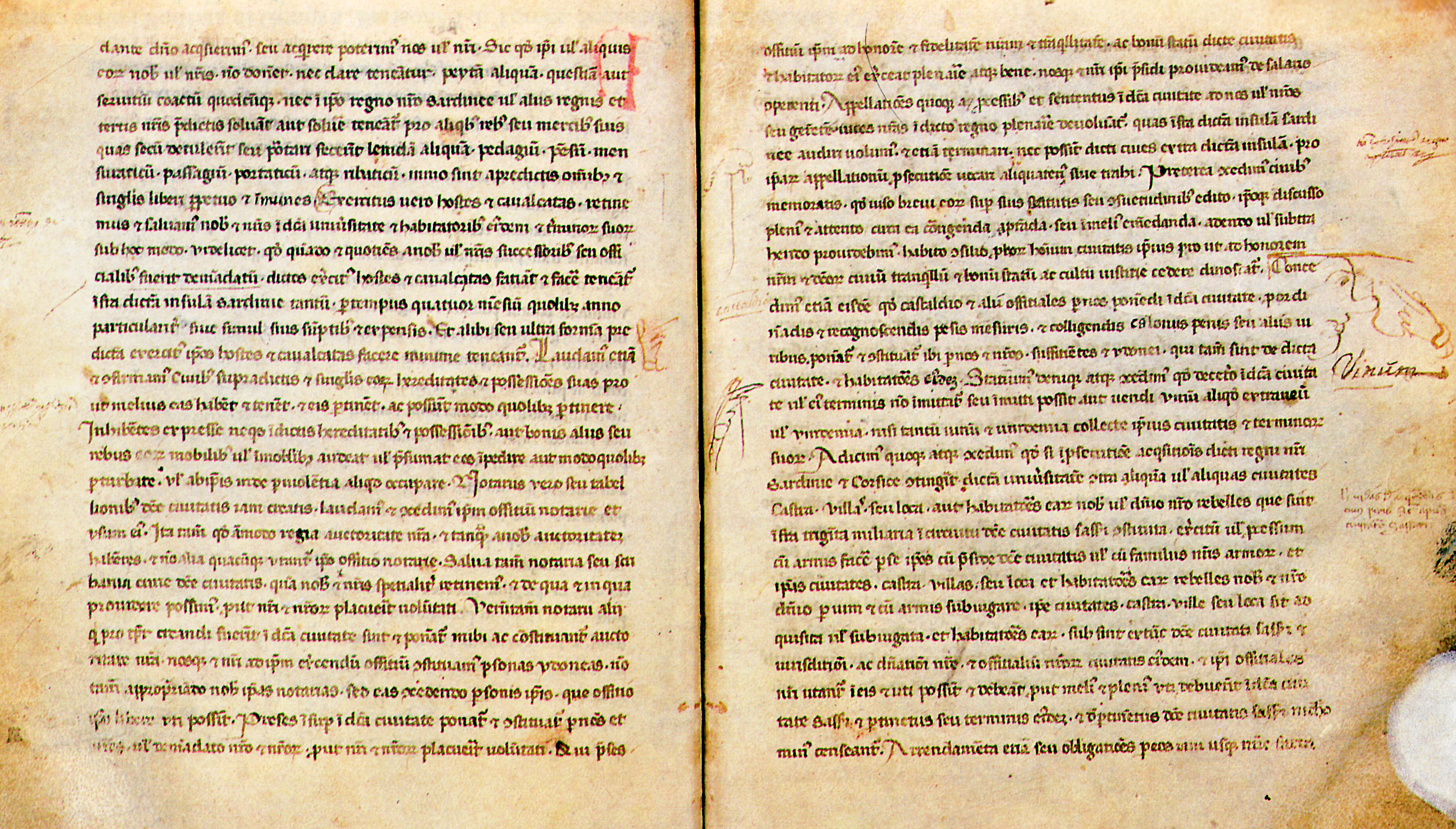
Text of the Statutes of Sassari in Latin

The so-called Statutes of Sassari were the official acts governing the organisational and institutional principles of both the city of Sassari and the wider municipality. The earliest surviving copy dates to 1316 during the Genoese podestà of Cavallino degli Onesti or degli Honestis, and is written in Latin, though another variant also exists in the Logudorese dialect of Sardinian. It is divided into three books of 160, 38 and 50 chapters respectively. The first book describes domestic and economic matters such as trade, duties and the city watch, and the second with civil law and administration of private property. The third book describes criminal law and associated punishments for criminal acts, and is noted for its unusual leniency compared with similar codes of law of its era.
