= Domenico Alberto Azuni =

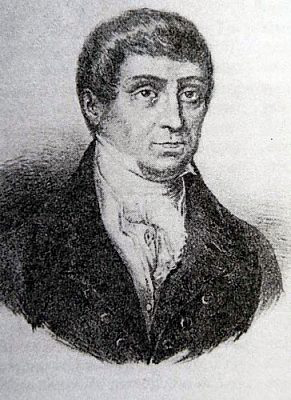
- Born: 3 August 1749; Sassari
- Died: 23 January 1827 (aged 77); Cagliari
- Occupations: jurist, magistrate

Domenico Alberto, chevalier Azuni (3 August 1749 – 23 January 1827) was a Sardinian jurist.

== Biography ==
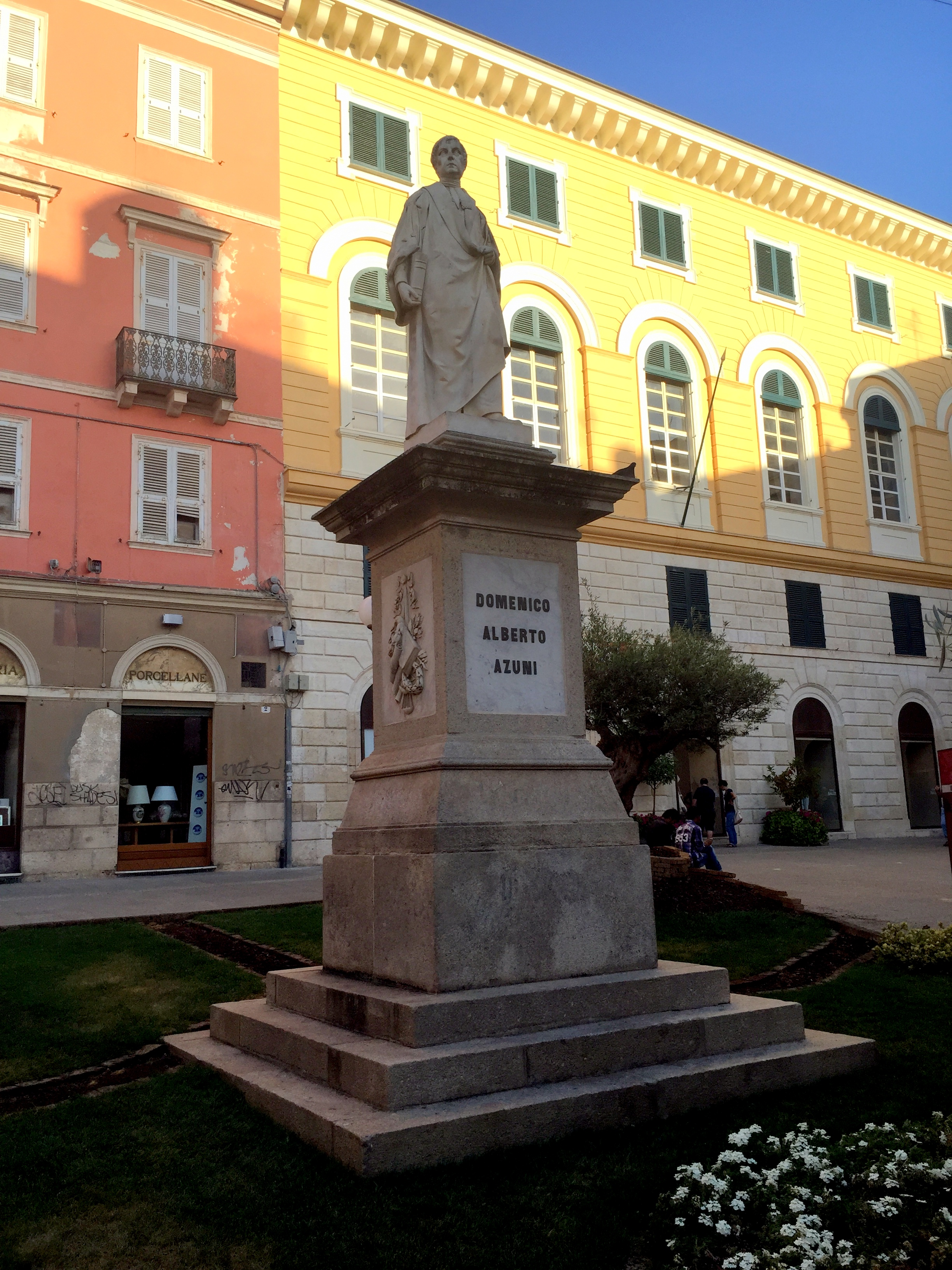
Azuni Square and statue in Sassari

He was born at Sassari, in Sardinia. He studied law at Sassari and Turin. He was influenced by Charles-Irénée Castel de Saint-Pierre. In 1782, he was made judge of the consulate at Nice. In 1786-1788, he published his Dizionario Universale Ragionato della Giurisprudenza Mercantile. In 1795, appeared his systematic work on the maritime law of Europe, Sistema Universale dei Principii del Diritto Maritimo deli Europa, which he afterwards recast and translated into French.

In 1806, he was appointed one of the French commission engaged in drawing up a general code of commercial law, and in the following year he proceeded to Genoa as president of the court of appeal. Azuni also wrote numerous pamphlets and minor works, chiefly on maritime law, an important treatise on the origin and progress of maritime law (Paris, 1810), and an historical, geographical and political account of Sardinia (1799, enlarged 1802).

After the fall of Napoleon in 1814, Azuni lived for a time in retirement at Genoa, until he was invited to Sardinia by Victor Emmanuel I, and appointed judge of the consulate at Cagliari, and director of the university library. He died at Cagliari in 1827.
