= Castle of Serravalle =

Medieval castle in Sardinia, Italy

- Castello di Serravalle (Italian); Casteddu de Serravalle (Sardinian)
- Bosa
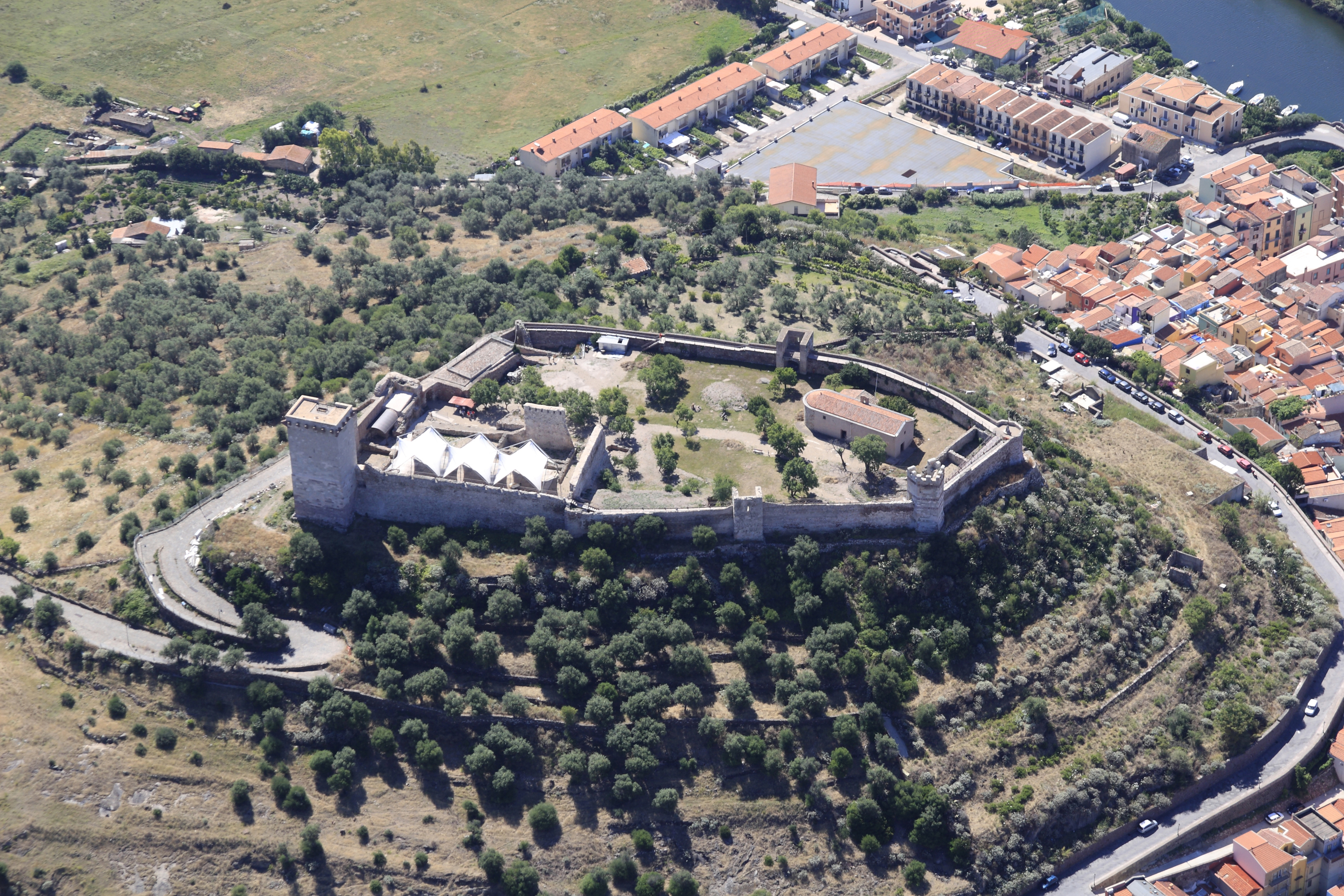
- Castle in Bosa

Site information
- Type: Castle

Location
- Location within Italy
- Coordinates: 40.297451°N 8.50473°E

Site history
- Built: c. 13th century

The Castle of Serravalle (Italian: Castello di Serravalle, Sardinian: Casteddu de Serravalle) is a medieval castle in Bosa, province of Oristano, Sardinia, Italy.

== History ==
It's named after the hill, overlooking the town of Bosa, on which it was built by the ancient Tuscany Malaspina family in the 13th century. It is on top of the hill of Serravalle, and it can be reached by a long, steep staircase. The first nucleus of the Serravalle Castle was built on the homonymous hill: the date of its construction, traditionally fixed in 1121 by the humanist and historian Giovanni Francesco Fara is to be postponed, with the contribution of the excavations conducted by the archaeologist Marco Milanese, around the second half of 13th century

In the vast Place-of-arms is located the small church of Our Lady de Sos Regnos Altos, the palatine chapel of the castle. In the interior of the sanctuary there are series of frescoes dating from the 14th century.
