= Fountain of the Rosello =

Coordinates: 40.73115°N 8.56072°E

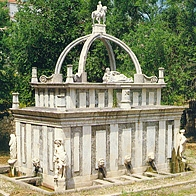
The fountain

The Fountain of the Rosello is a fountain in Sassari, Sardinia, Italy, considered the symbol of the city.

It is located at the end of the Rosello valley next to the ancient district of the city.

== History ==
It was built among 1603 and 1606 by Genoese craftsmen on the site of a preexisting source along the valley. To bring the water from the Rosello to the houses was a team of 300 water carrier that filled their barrels that loaded on the pack saddle of their donkeys.

The fountain was also used by the housekeepers to make the laundry of garments and laundry.
