= Giovanni del Giglio =

Italian painter

- Born: End of the fifteenth century Sassari, Sardinia
- Died: 1554; Sassari, Sardinia
- Known for: Painting
- Movement: Mannerist

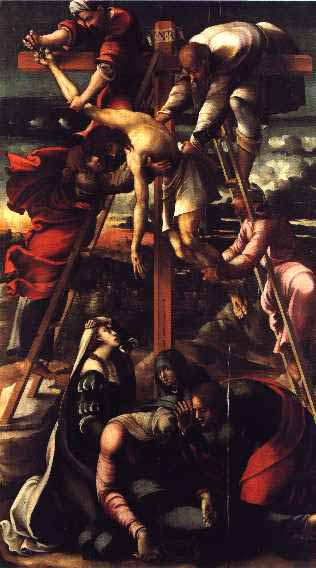
Giovanni del Giglio, Deposizione

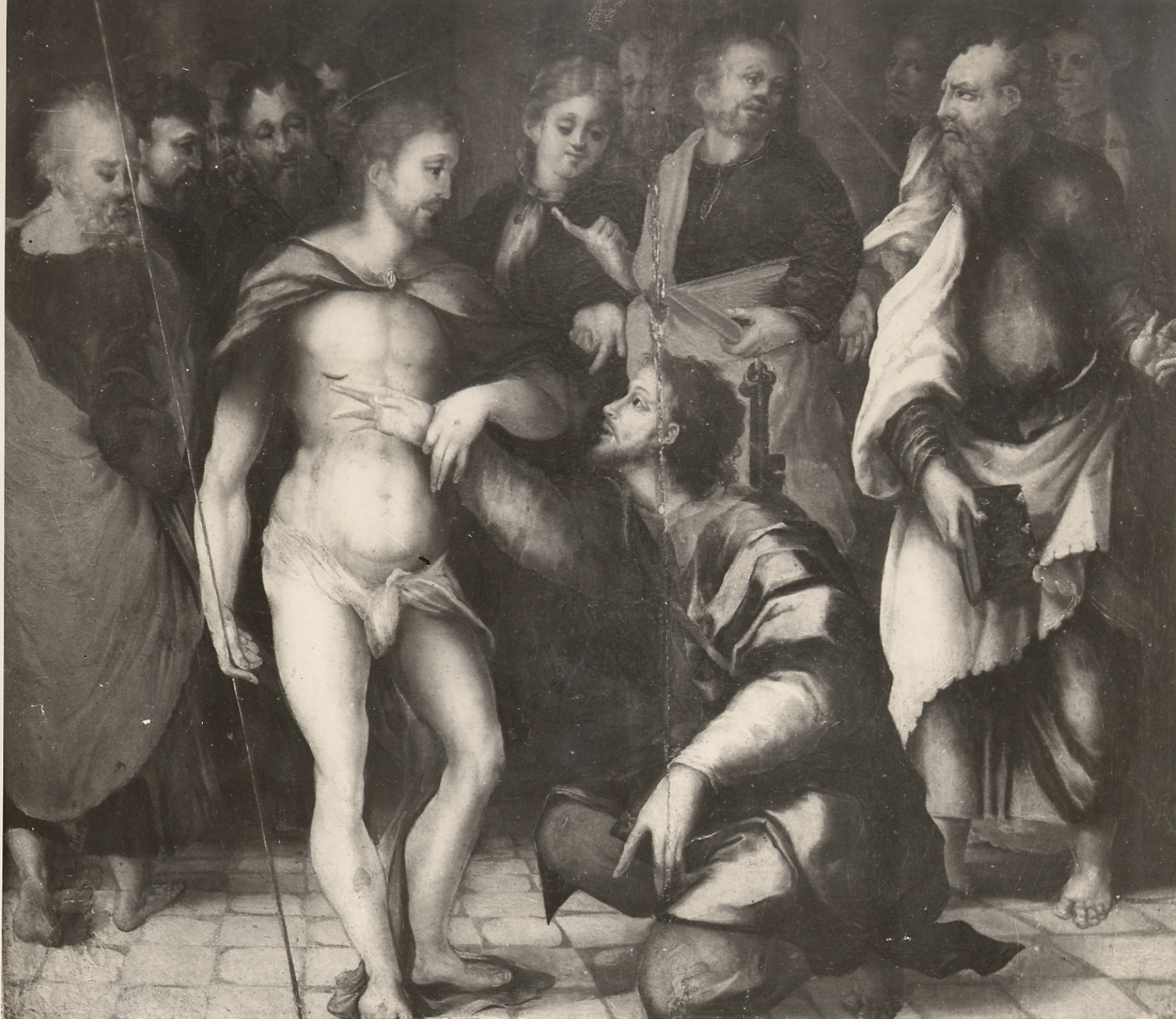
Giovanni del Giglio, Incredulità di San Tommaso (Sassari, Museo Sanna)

Giovanni del Giglio (late fifteenth century – 1557) was a painter from Sardinia He was born and died in Sassari.

== Biography ==
The first mention of Giovanni del Giglio might be from 1512, when the monk "Johannes de Liliis" arrived in Sassari to restore the hospital of Santa Croce. (Note: Despite the similarity of the names, it is difficult to be certain that Giovanni and the monk are the same person because: first, de Liliis was a monk, while del Giglio married; and secondly, the monk is never mentioned as a painter.) On August 7, 1522, del Giglio witnessed the will of Giovanni Fontana, father of the jurist Alessio Fontana, who ordered that his property be used for the altarpiece of Sassari Cathedral.

Del Giglio was the attorney of Archbishop Salvatore Alepus, who commissioned del Giglio's Ploaghe altarpiece. From 1532 to 1543, Giglio was part of the Sassari confraternity. Around 1543, he married Andreuccia Olives, the sister of the jurist Girolamo Olives, and the widow of the tailor Forteleoni de Ginesi. From Olive's previous marriage, he gained a stepdaughter, who was born in 1540. Del Giglio had no other children. This marriage allowed him to convince Girolamo Olives' confidant, the bishop of Alghero, Pedro Vaguer, to give him the commission for the altarpieces of Benetutti and Bortigali between 1549 and 1551. These may have been completed by other painters of his school, possibly Pietro Giovanni Calvano, from Siena.

== School ==
Other painters of his school were Antonio Campus, Giovanni Debasteriga, and Leonardo de Serra. The Ozieri altarpiece is attributed to his school.

== Style ==
Del Giglio's style, which had a large influence on painting in Sardinia until the arrival of Baccio Gorini, shows the influence of Raphael and Michelangelo as well as the early Tuscan style of Rosso Fiorentino and Pontormo. His use of color and techniques placed him among the leading Mannerists in Sardenia.
