= Sant'Orsola, Sassari =

Neighborhood in Sassari, Italy

Coordinates: 38°05′39″N 14°53′18″E

Sant'Orsola
- Frazione
- Country: Italy
- Region: Sardinia
- Comune: Sassari

Population
  - Total: 6,500
- Time zone: UTC+1 (CET)
  - Summer (DST): UTC+2 (CEST)
- Patron saint: Saint Ursula
- Saint day: October 21st

Sant'Orsola is a neighborhood in the 2nd circoscrizione of Sassari, Italy. It is commonly broken down into three parts, Sant'Orsola, Sant'Orsola Sud (South), and Sant'Orsola Nord (North), and borders Santa Maria di Pisa and Latte Dolce.

== History ==
The first to use the name Sant'Orsola in this area was the Sant'Orsola villa of the noble Cugia family, which was presumably named after Saint Ursula. It seems the villa was built before 1636 and passed from Pietro Cugia Rustarucello to his cousin, Dr. Domenico Cugia Brunengo, after his death in 1667. The first neighborhood under the current name grew around the Sant'Orsola estate and was governed by the marquesses of Sant'Orsola after this title was bestowed upon the Cugia family.

The area was further developed in the 1960s by architect Marco Cugia, who was president of Sant'Orsola for many years.

== Modern day ==
Sant'Orsola now houses 6,500 people and is known for its basketball teams, founded by former president Marco Cugia. The current president of Sant'Orsola is Mauro Dessena.

== Places of interest ==
- Villa Sant'Orsola, 17th century estate of the marquesses of Sant'Orsola
- Vecchia Chiesa di Sant'Orsola, 17th century church containing a reliquary of Saint Ursula
- Piazza Edina Altara, central square
