= Gerolamo Araolla =

Sardinian poet and priest

- Born: 1542; Sassari
- Died: 1615 (aged 72–73); Rome
- Occupations: poet, priest

Gerolamo Araolla, also known as Hieronimu Araolla, (Sassari, 1542 - Rome, 1615) was a Sardinian poet and priest.

== Early life ==
Gerolamo Araolla was born into a distinguished family. He was a pupil of the Sassari physician and philologist Gavino Sambigucci. After studying literature and philosophy, Araolla graduated with a law degree from the University of Pisa in 1567. Shortly after graduation, he took his vows and became a priest in Bosa in 1569.

== Poetry ==
Araolla was a significant poet, writing a number of verses in the three hegemonic languages of the island: Spanish, Sardinian, and Tuscan/Italian. He said that poetry is especially delicate, sweet, and moving. He felt, however, that it was necessary to overcome the humanistic conception of poetry as polite and imitatio dei. Araolla was a Petrarchist, profoundly cultured, with a great knowledge of Torquato Tasso; his Neoplatonism rested on the solid foundation of Augustinian thought.

Araolla enthusiastically participated in the cultural ferment that animated his Sassari youth, and entered into friendships with the leading Sassarian intellectuals of the 16th century.

In 1582, he published his poem Sa vida, su martiriu, et morte dessos gloriosos Martires Gavinu, Brothu et Gianuari, based on folk tales about Saint Gabinus. This work, consisting of 244 stanzas and approximately two thousand verses, had wide circulation on Sardinia. It was probably distributed by the village clergy as an aid to pastoral work. The poem is the largest attempt at the construction of a literary Sardinian language, aiming at "exhalting and enriching our Sardinian language, like all the other nations in the world already did with their own language" (magnificare, & arrichire sa limba nostra Sarda; dessa matessi manera qui sa naturale insoro tottu sas naciones dessu mundu hant magnificadu & arrichidu, Incipit). Even the metrical structure of the work, ottava rima, is an attempt to connect his work in the Sardinian language with Italian literature.

Some time after 1590, Araolla commemorated Pier Michele Giagaraccio with the sonnet onor di Sassari e delizia dell'Arno (Honor of Sassari and delight of the Arno).

A few years later, the introduction of his work: Rimas diversas spirituales (1597), focused on notions of poetics and rhetoric in an effort to prove that Sardinian has the same dignity as Latin, Spanish, and Italian (tengiat cognitione de sa limba Sarda comente tenet de sas de pius, int. 35). Rimas diversas spirituales was dedicated to Don Blascu d'Alagon.

== Works ==
- Sa vida, su martirio, et morte dessos gloriosos martires Gavinu, Brothu et Gianuari, per Francisci Guarneriu istampadore de Nicolau Canellas, Calaris (Cagliari) 1582
- Rimas diversas Spirituales de su Dottore Hieronimu Araolla Sardu Sassaresu, Ioanne Maria Galcerinu, Calaris (Cagliari) 1597

== Bibliography ==
- F. Delitala, Oratio de Hyeronimo Araolla poeta secerensi habita in solemni studiorum instauratione a Fulgentio Delitala philos. Collegii doctore, Saceri [Sassari], Ex Typ. Arch. Raymundi Azara, 1840.
- P. Mossa, Saggio di versione italiana del Gavino trionfante di Gerolamo Araolla, "La Stella di Sardegna”, Sassari, Tipografia Azuni, 3, 1876, vol. 2, pp. 172–174.
- P. Nurra, Antologia dialettale dei classici poeti sardi: G. Araolla, Sassari, G. Dessì, 1897.
- R. Garzia, Gerolamo Araolla, Bologna, Stabilimento Poligrafico emiliano, 1914.
- F. Alziator, Storia della letteratura di Sardegna, Cagliari, 3T, 1982, pp. 104–110.
- Girolamo Araolla and his Solution to the Sardinian "Questione della lingua", AAIS, April, 1990, University of Virginia.
- N. Tanda, Letteratura e lingue in Sardegna, Sassari, Edes, 1991, pp. 17–18, 60-61, n. 17.
- D. Manca, Introduzione a [A. CANO], Sa Vitta et sa Morte, et Passione de sanctu Gavinu, Prothu et Januariu, Cagliari, Centro di Studi Filologici Sardi/Cuec, 2002, p. 345
- G. Porcu, Régula castigliana. Poesia sarda e metrica spagnola dal '500 al '700, Il Maestrale, Nuoro 2008, pp. 13, 14, 21, 61, 145, 146, 153-156, 158, 164.
- D. Manca, La comunicazione linguistica e letteraria dei Sardi: dal Medioevo alla «fusione perfetta», «Bollettino di Studi Sardi», IV, 4 (2011), Centro di Studi Filologici Sardi, Cagliari, Cuec, 2011, pp. 49–75.
- Onnis, Omar; Mureddu, Manuelle (2019). Illustres. Vita, morte e miracoli di quaranta personalità sarde (in Italian). Sestu: Domus de Janas. ISBN 978-88-97084-90-7. OCLC 1124656644.
