= Michele Zanche =

Italian politician (1203–1275)

Michele Zanche (Note: Sometimes rendered in English as Michael Zanche, as in Longfellow's translation of Inferno.) (1203 – Sassari, 1275) was an Italian politician, best known as a character in Dante Alighieri's Divine Comedy, where he is mentioned in Canto XXII of Inferno, in the fifth bolgia of the eighth circle, among the barrators, (Note: The dictionary definition of barrator at Wiktionary) together with Friar Gomita, vicar of Nino Visconti judge of Gallura. He married Simona Doria, from the famous and wealthy Genoese family.

== Biography ==
No direct ancestry is known. The surname Zanca (which in the documentation also presents the variants Thanca, Çanca, Tanca; the spelling Zanche is to be understood as the Latin form in the genitive) has been documented in northern Sardinia since the 11th–12th centuries, as testified by condaghes and other sources in which individuals of servile status are mentioned, as well as local officials, without further specification of their geographical origin and kinship.

He was seneschal of King Enzo of Hohenstaufen, husband of the judge Adelasia of Torres: he won her trust and then carried out continuous frauds (according to chronicles, not supported by documents in this regard). When, in 1239, Enzo left Sardinia, he appointed 'donno Michel' vicar in the judicate (also this news is not historically ascertained): he, however, exploiting the power conferred on him for his own interests, became very rich by charging for the favours he bestowed on many subjects (such as freeing prisoners).

Already in 1236, Zanche was part of the plot to assassinate the young judge Barisone III of Torres in Sassari, who was succeeded by his sister Adelasia, whose first husband Ubaldo Visconti of Gallura seems to have been no stranger to organising the crime. The regent Ithocorre had, in fact, burdened the Sassaresi with onerous tributes: the protest spread and Zanche, together with other local nobles, was exiled to Genoa.

After Enzo's death in 1272 in Bologna, it appears that Zanche completely usurped sovereign authority, so much so that, not justifiably, some writers consider him the last judge of Torres. Pietro di Dante states that Michele married Queen Adelasia (divorced from Enzo) and had a daughter, Caterina, later the wife of the Genoese Branca Doria. This information is not supported by any documents, nor is the fact that, instead of Adelasia, the enterprising man had married Bianca Lancia, the presumed mother of the Hohenstaufen sovereign (she was of his half-brother Manfred). In any case, Michele exercised his office disregarding the legitimate giudicessa Adelasia, who was confined to Burgos castle and died around 1259.

For reasons that are unclear, but certainly linked to succession interests, in 1275, his son-in-law Branca Doria had Zanche treacherously murdered during a feast in his castle in the Nurra, in the presence of his cousin Barisone Doria: the barrator's corpse was then cut to pieces.

The death of Adelasia caused the extinction of the Judicate of Torres, whose lands were divided between the Doria, the Malaspina, the Judicate of Arborea and the free Commune of Sassari.

Three children were born from the marriage with Simona Doria: an anonymous possibly named Mariano (died before 1284) who married Imelda Sismondi, the aforementioned Caterina (1253–1316) and Richelda (1282 – before 1302), who married Giacomo Spinola.

== See also ==
- Adelasia of Torres
- Barratry – a legal term with several meanings
- Doria (family)
- Enzo of Sardinia
- Malaspina family
- Sassari
