= Lake Temo =

Dam of Sardinia

- Lago Temo (Italian)
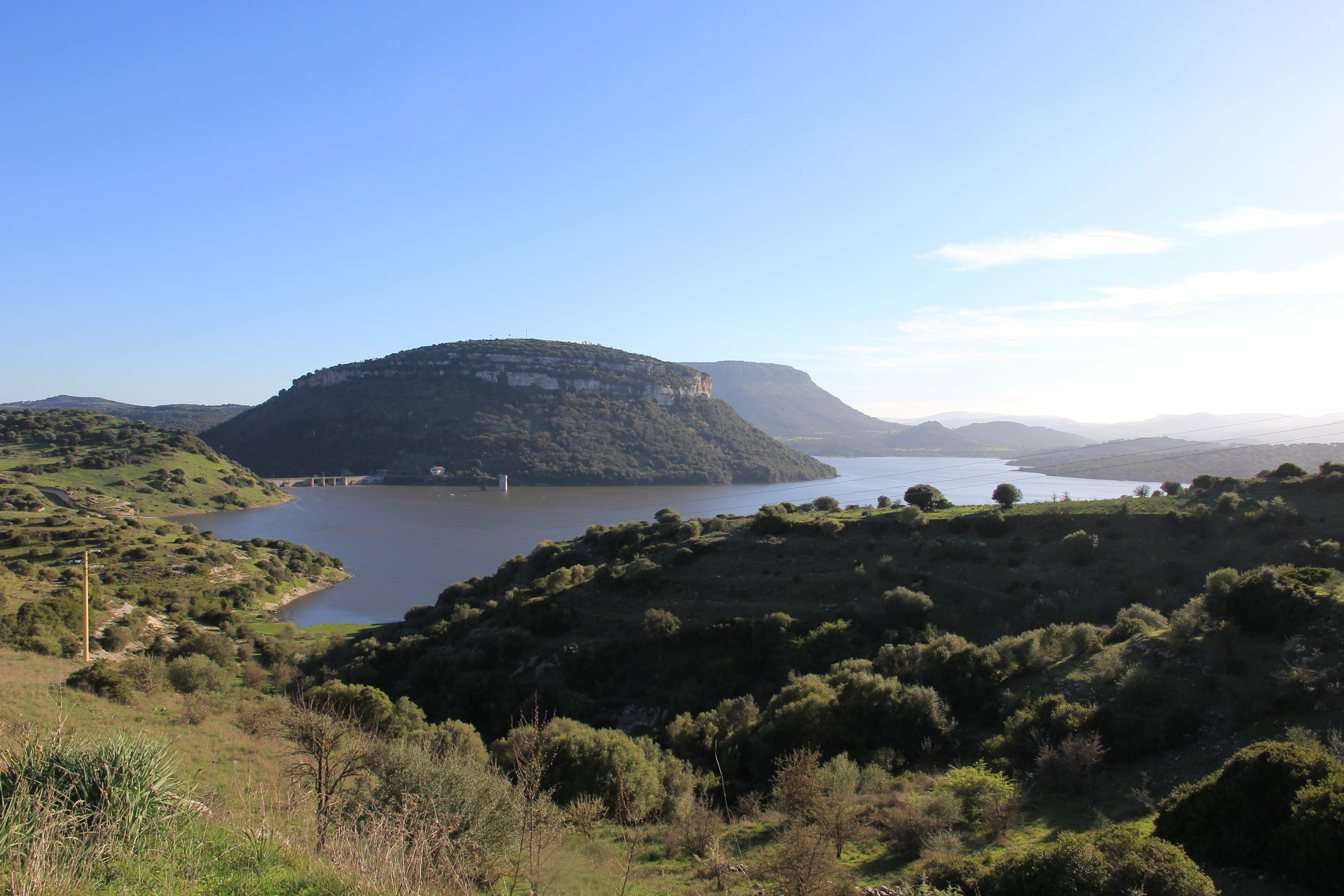

- Location within Sardinia
- Location: Northern Sardinia
- Coordinates: 40.471°N 8.544°E
- Type: artificial lake
- Primary inflows: Temo River
- Primary outflows: Temo River
- Basin countries: Italy
- Surface area: 4.99 km^{2} (1.93 sq mi)
- Water volume: 95.7×10^{6} m^{3} (77,600 acre⋅ft)
- Surface elevation: 228 m (748 ft)

Lake Temo (Italian: Lago Temo) is an artificial lake in northern Sardinia, Italy, located in the Province of Sassari.

It has a surface area of 4.99 square kilometres (1.93 sq mi) and a capacity of 95.7 million cubic metres of water.

The dam was built between 1971 and 1984 by the engineer Giorgio Pietrangeli. It is 205 metres (673 ft) long and 58 metres (190 ft) wide. The reservoir has the function of water supply.
