= Pier Michele Giagaraccio =

- Born: Sassari
- Died: circa 1590
- Occupations: jurist, lawyer

Pier Michele Giagaraccio (Sassari, ... - circa 1590) was a jurist, lawyer, and poet from Sardinia. He flourished in sixteenth century Sassari.

== Life ==
Giagaraccio was born in Sardinia and studied law in Sassari, but lectured on civil institutions at the University of Pisa from 1565 to 1567. At a later point in life, he decided to return to the island, where he practiced law and taught jurisprudence for free in his hometown.

Giagaraccio was also interested in the humanities and became friends with the most famous Sardinian writers of his time. He died shortly after 1590. To commemorate him, Gerolamo Araolla wrote a sonnet in Italian, onor di Sassari e delizia dell'Arno (Honor of Sassari and delight of the Arno).

Giagaraccio's children were also dedicated students and successful lawyers. His ancient surname, Giagaraccio, has transformed into the modern name Cesaraccio.

== Bibliography ==
- Fabroni, Historia accademia pisana, Volume II, p. 467
- Araolla, Rime spirituali
- Dizionario biografico degli uomini illustri di Sardegna: ossia, Storia della vita pubblica e privata di tutti i Sardi che si distinsero per opere, azioni, talenti, virtu' e delitti, Volume 2
