= Temo (river) =

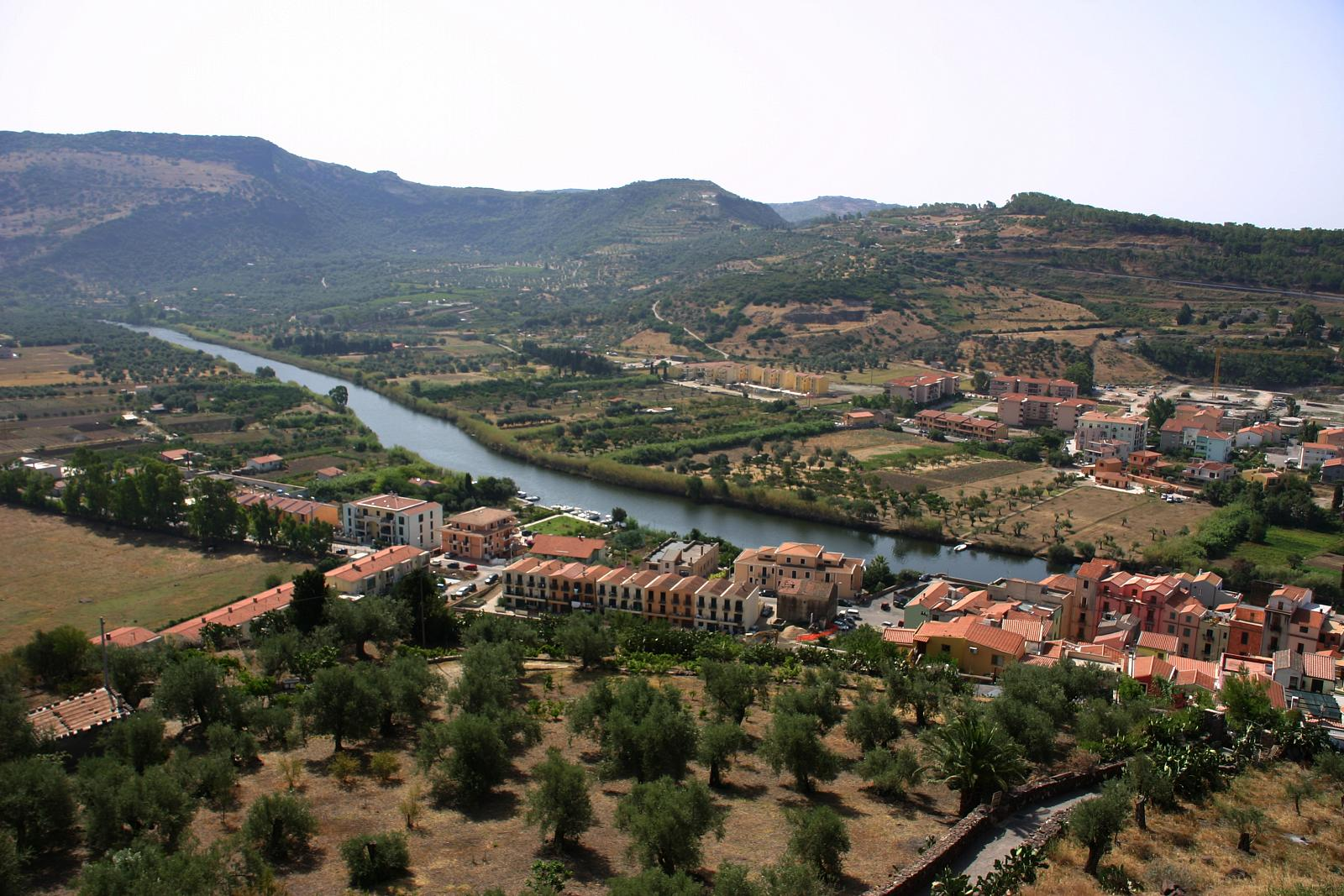
- The river Temo in Bosa

Location
- Country: Italy

Physical characteristics
- Source
  - location: monte Calarighe, Villanova Monteleone
  - elevation: 473 m (1,552 ft)
- Mouth: Sea of Sardinia (Mediterranean Sea)
  - location: Bosa
  - coordinates: 40.2906°N 8.4754°E
- Length: 55 km (34 mi)

The Temo (Temu in Sardinian) is a river in western Sardinia, Italy.

Along its course were built two dams:

- the Diga di Monte Crispu with the purpose of protecting the town of Bosa against flooding
- the Diga dell'Alto Temo that forms a reservoir of 4.99 km2 designed for water supply.
