= Sassari =

Second-largest city in Sardinia

Sassari Sàssari (Sassarese) Tàtari (Sardinian)
- Comune
- Comune di Sassari
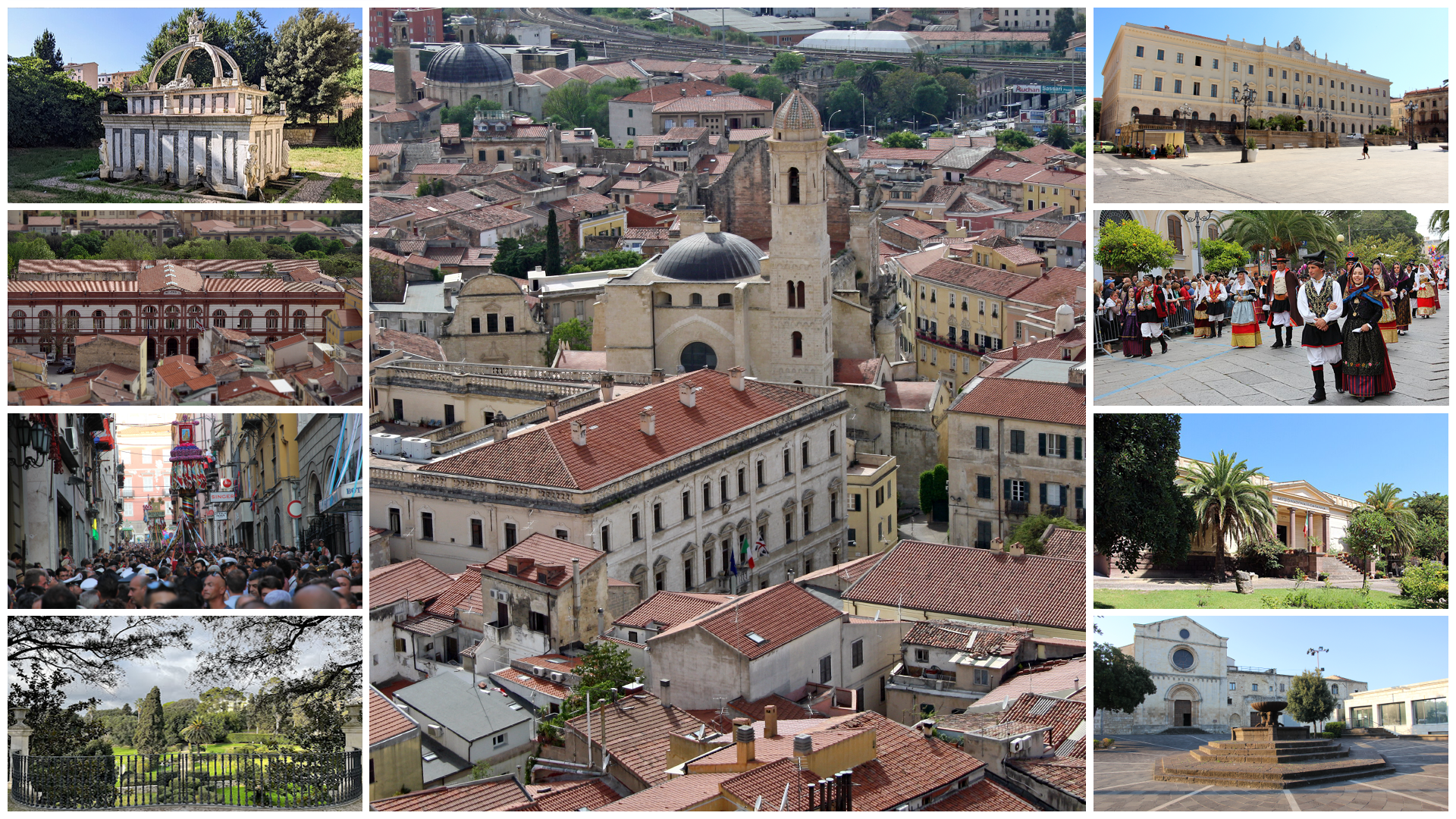
- on left: Fountain of the Rosello; University main building; Faradda di li Candareri; Park of Monserrato; in the centre:View of the old town; on right: Government building; Cavalcata sarda; Archeological national museum; Saint Mary of Betlem

- Flag Coat of arms

- Location within Italy Location within Sardinia Location within Europe
- Coordinates: 40°43′30″N 8°33′31″E
- Country: Italy
- Region: Sardinia
- Metropolitan city: Sassari
- Frazioni: Argentiera; Bancali; Biancareddu; Campanedda; Canaglia; Caniga; La Corte; La Landrigga; La Pedraia; Ottava; Palmadula; Platamona; Saccheddu; San Giovanni; Tottubella

Government
  - Mayor: Giuseppe Mascia

Area
  - Total: 547.04 km^{2} (211.21 sq mi)
- Elevation: 225 m (738 ft)

Population (2026)
  - Total: 120,231
  - Density: 219.78/km^{2} (569.24/sq mi)
- Demonym: Sassaresi or Turritani
- Time zone: UTC+1 (CET)
  - Summer (DST): UTC+2 (CEST)
- Postal code: 07100
- Dialing code: 079
- Patron saint: Saint Nicholas
- Saint day: 6 December
- Website: Official website

Sassari (US: /ˈsɑːsəri, ˈsɑːsɑːri/ SAH-sər-ee, SAH-sar-ee; Italian: [ˈsassari]; Sassarese: Sàssari [ˈsasːari]; Sardinian: Tàtari [ˈtataɾi]) is the 2nd-largest city in the autonomous island region of Sardinia in Italy, as well as the capital and largest of its metropolitan city with a population of 120,231 as of 2026, and a functional urban area of about 260,000 inhabitants. One of the oldest cities on the island, it contains a considerable collection of art.

Since its origins at the turn of the 12th century, Sassari has been ruled by the Giudicato of Torres, the Pisans, as an independent republic in alliance with Genoa, by the Aragonese and the Spanish, all of whom have contributed to Sassari's historical and artistic heritage. Sassari is a city rich in art, culture and history, and is well known for its palazzi, the Fountain of the Rosello, and its elegant neoclassical architecture, such as Piazza d'Italia (Italy Square) and the Teatro Civico (Civic Theatre).

As Sardinia's second most populated city, it has a considerable amount of cultural, touristic, commercial and political importance in the island. The city's economy mainly relies on tourism and services, however also partially on research, construction, pharmaceuticals and the petroleum industry.

== History ==
=== Prehistory and ancient history ===
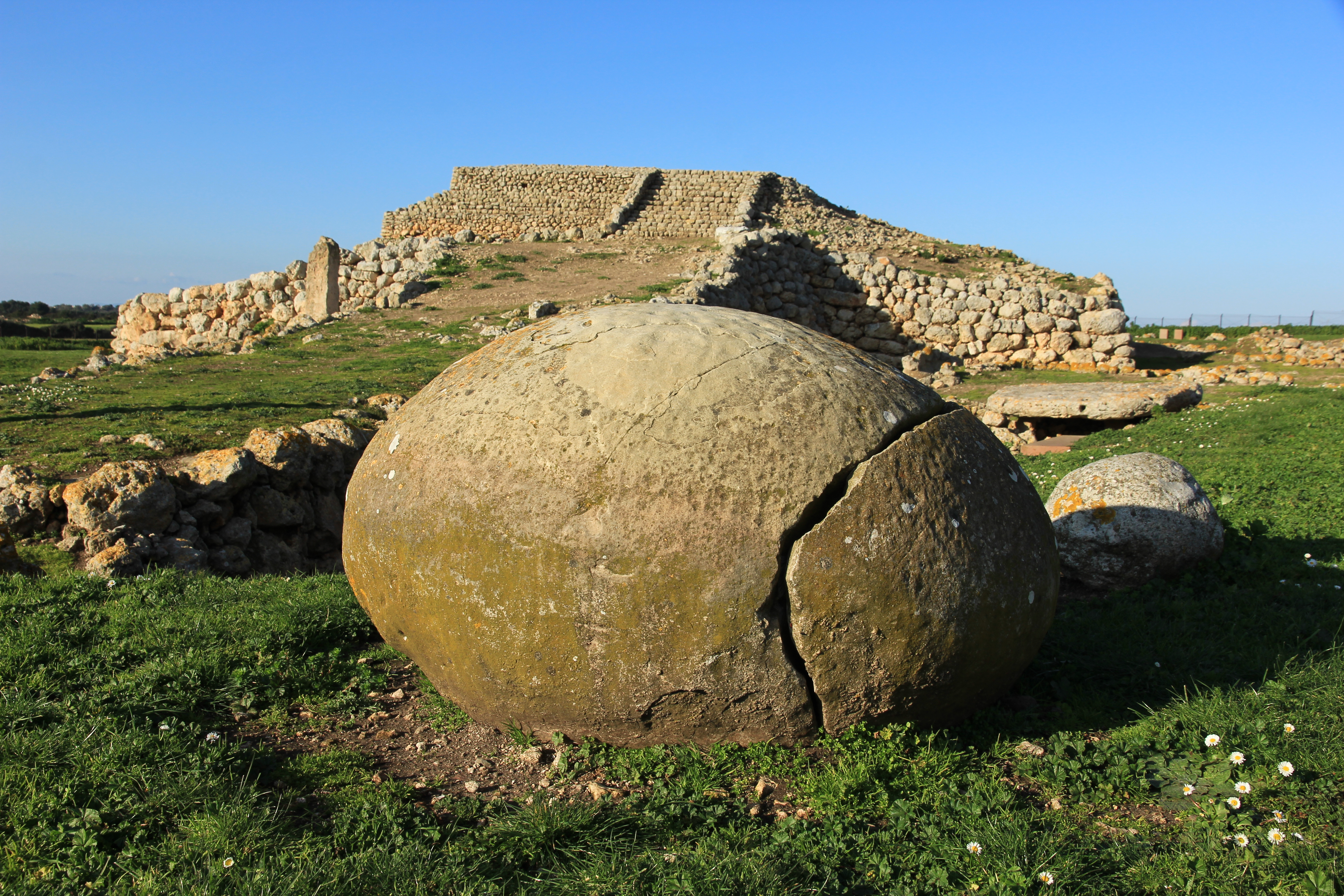
Prehistoric step Pyramid of Monte d'Accoddi

Although Sassari was founded in the early Middle Ages, the surrounding area has been inhabited since the Neolithic age, and throughout ancient history, by the Nuragics and the Romans.
Many archaeological sites and ancient ruins are located inside or around the town: the prehistoric step pyramid of Monte d'Accoddi, a large number of Nuraghes and Domus de Janas (Fairy Houses), the ruins of a Roman aqueduct, the ruins of a Roman villa discovered under San Nicholas Cathedral, and a portion of the ancient road that connected the Latin city of Turris Libisonis with Caralis. In the locality of Fiume Santo is also found a fossil site where an Oreopithecus bambolii, a prehistoric anthropomorphic primate, was discovered, dated at 8.5 million years.

=== Middle Ages ===
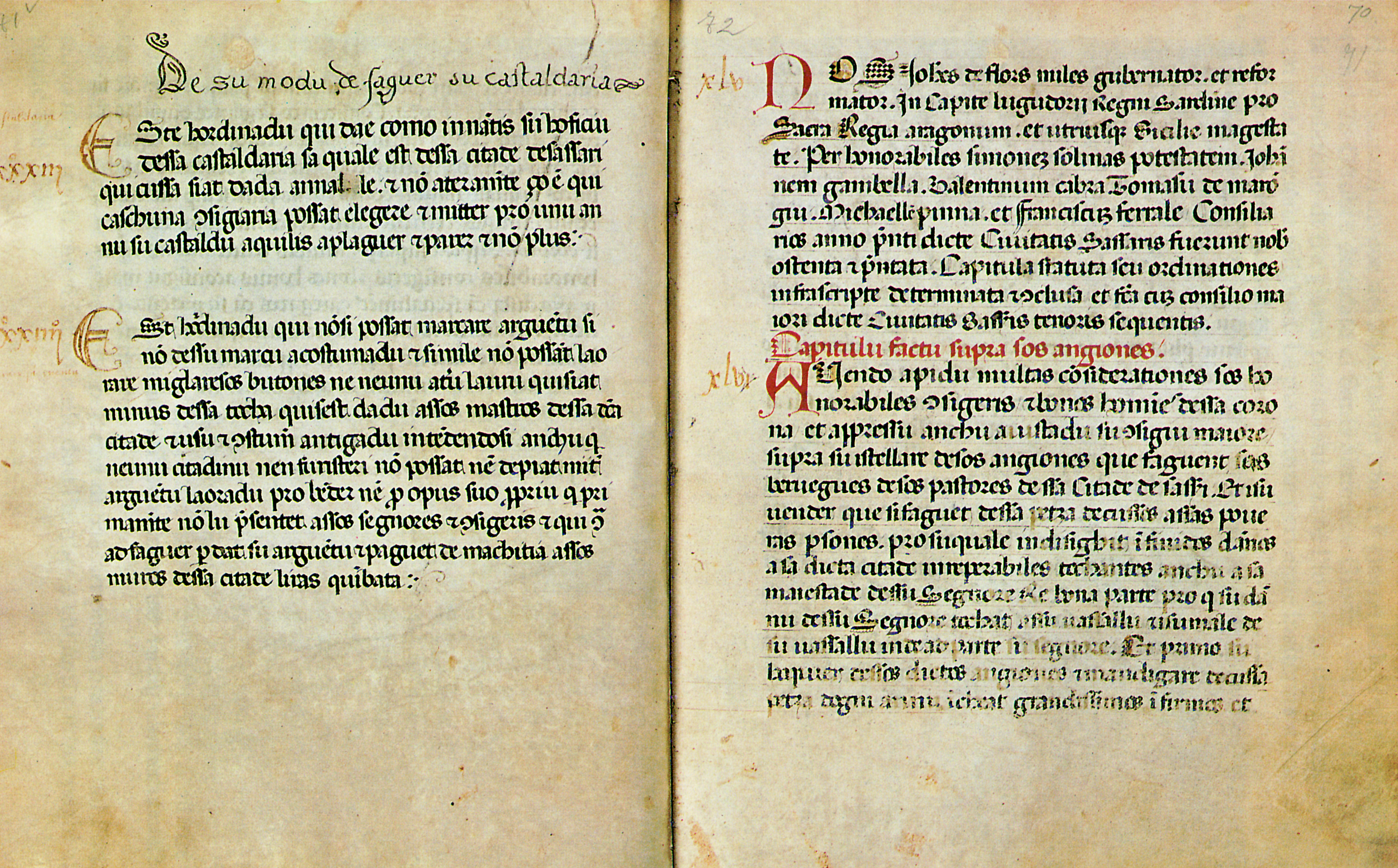
The Sassari Republic's medieval statutes written in Latin and Sardinian

The origin of the city remains uncertain. Among the theses, according to folk tradition the first village was founded around the 9th–10th century AD by the inhabitants of the ancient Roman port of Turris Libisonis (current Porto Torres), who sought refuge in the mainland to escape the Saracen attacks from the sea.

It developed from the merger of a number of separate villages, such as San Pietro di Silki, San Giacomo di Taniga, and San Giovanni di Bosove. The oldest mention of the village is in an 1131 document in the archive of the Monastery of St. Peter in Silki where is cited a man named Jordi de Sassaro (George of Sassari), a serf from the nearby village of Bosove. Sassari was sacked by the Genoese in 1166. Immigration continued until, in the early 13th century, it was the most populous city in the Giudicato of Torres, and its last capital. After the assassination of Michele Zanche, the latter's last ruler in 1275, Sassari became subject to the Republic of Pisa with a semi-independent status.

In 1284, the Pisans were defeated by the Genoese fleet at the Battle of Meloria, and the city was able to free itself: it became the Republic of Sassari, the first and only early independent renaissance city-state of Sardinia, with statutes of its own, allied to Genoa; the Genoese were pleased to see it thus withdrawn from Pisan control. Its statutes of 1316 are remarkable for the leniency of the penalties imposed when compared with the penal laws of the Middle Ages.

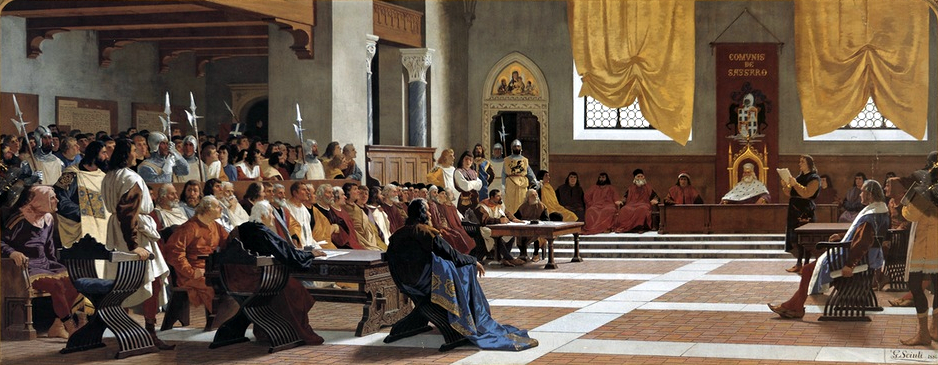
The proclamation of the Republic of Sassari (The Council), Giuseppe Sciuti, 1880, Sassari

From 1323, the Republic of Sassari decided to side with the King of Aragon, in whose hands it remained for much of the following centuries, though the population revolted at least three times. The revolts ceased when King Alfonso V of Aragon nominated the town as a Royal Burg, directly ruled by the King and free from feudal taxation, during a period in which it may have been the most populous city in Sardinia. Further attempts made by Genoa to conquer the city failed. In 1391 it was conquered by Brancaleone Doria and Marianus V of Arborea, of the independent Sardinian Giudicato of Arborea, of which it became the last capital.

However, in 1420, the city was sold along with the remaining territory for 100,000 florins to the Crown of Aragon, replaced by Spain after 1479 on the joining of the Aragonese and Castilian thrones.

=== Renaissance ===
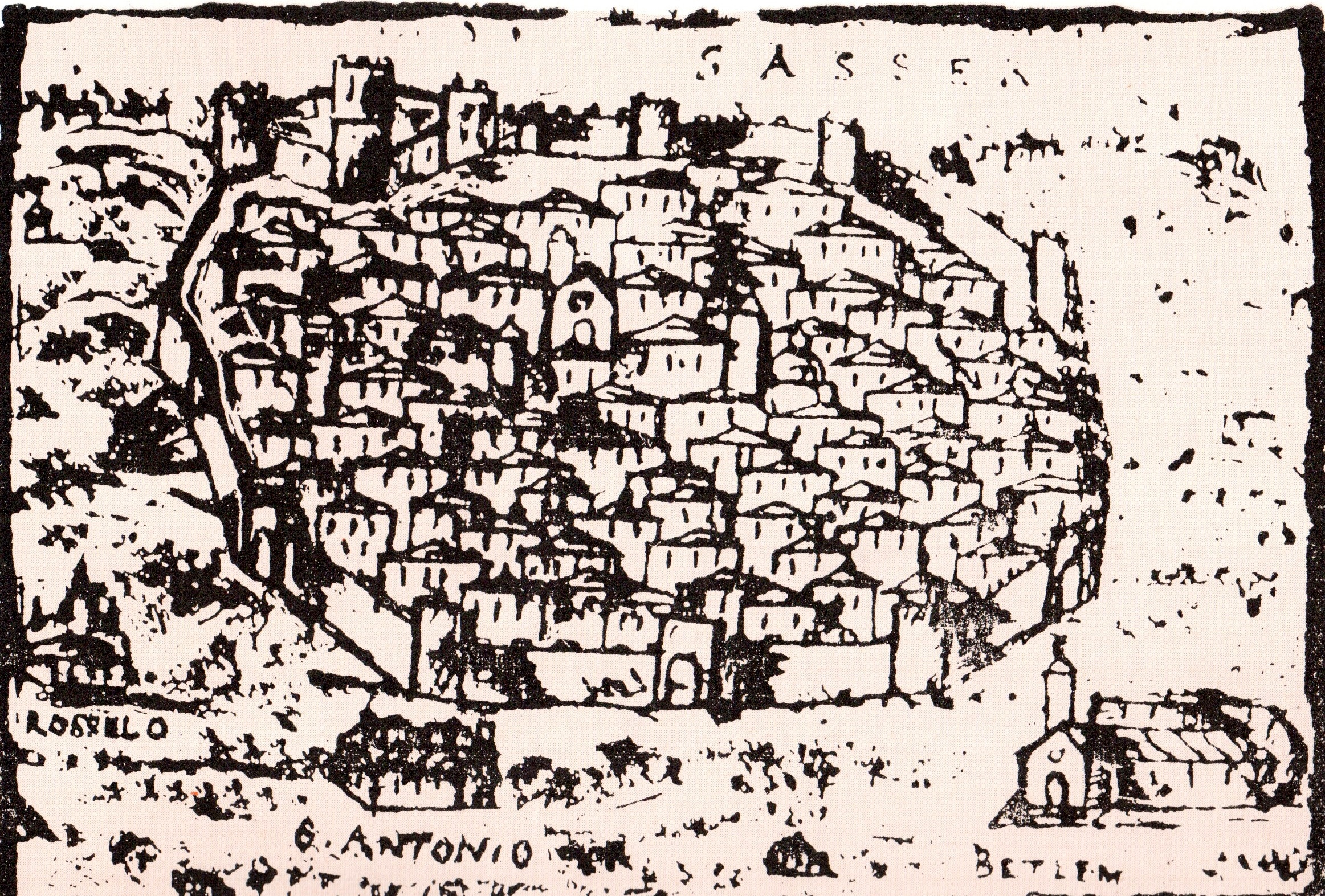
Sassari view in 16th century

The city alternated years of crisis, featuring economic exploitation, the decrease of the maritime trade, made unsafe by the daily raids of Saracen pirates, political corruption of its rulers, the sacking of Sassari in 1527 by the French, and two plagues in 1528 and 1652, with periods of cultural and economic prosperity. The Jesuits founded the first Sardinian university in Sassari in 1562. In the same year, the first printing press was introduced and the ideals of Renaissance humanism became more widely known. Several artists of the Mannerist and Flemish schools practiced their art in the city.

=== Modern history ===
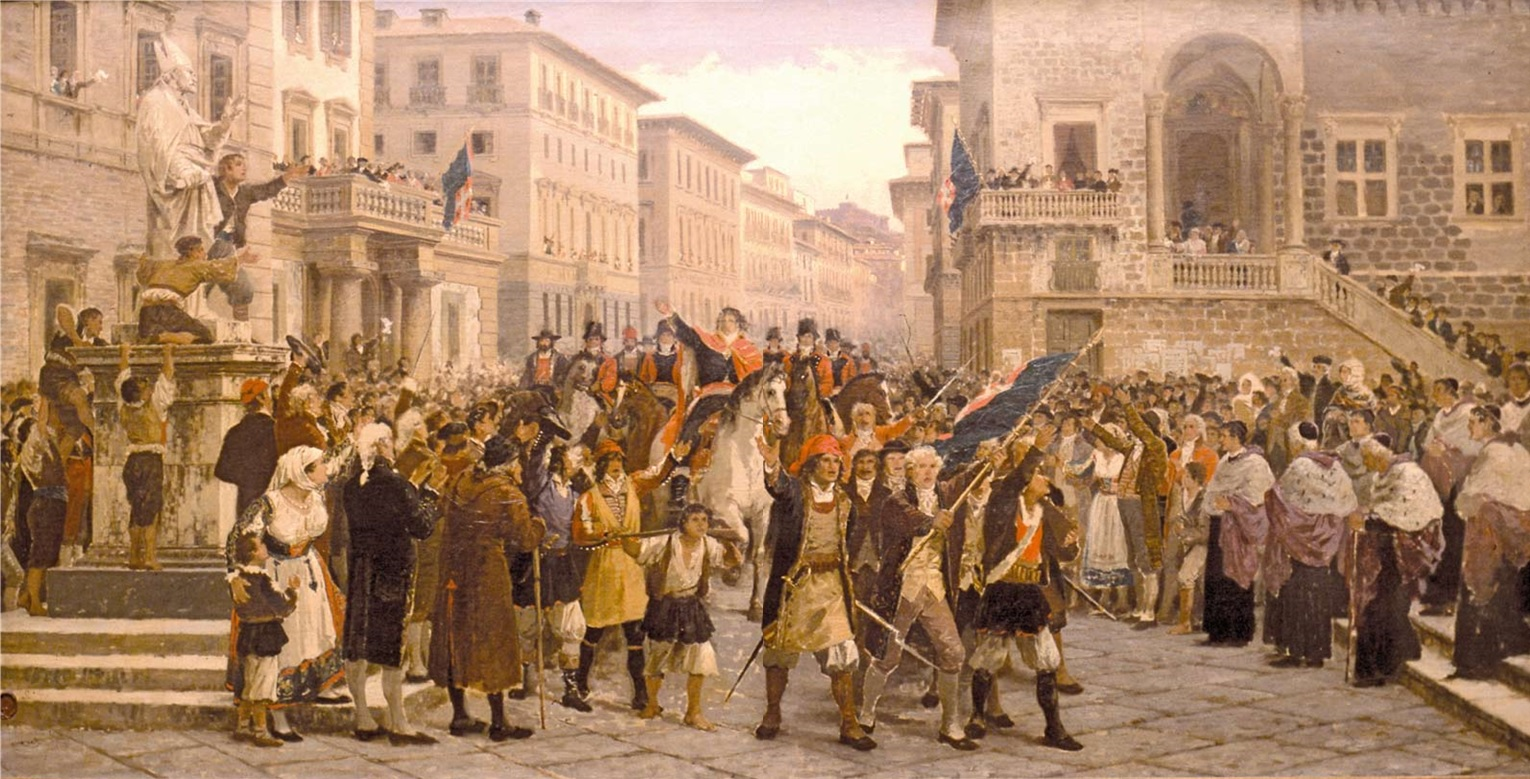
Giovanni Maria Angioy, the Emissary of the Viceroy enters Sassari (1795).

After the end of the Spanish period following the European wars of the early 18th century, the brief period of Austrian rule (1708–1717) was succeeded by domination by the Piedmontese, who then took over the title of Kingdom of Sardinia (1720–1861). In 1795 an anti-feudal uprising broke out in the town, led by the Emissary of the Viceroy Giovanni Maria Angioy, a Sardinian civil servant, who later fought unsuccessfully against the house of Savoy. The city was occupied by troops at the time. The dynasty of the Piedmontese King of Sardinia went on to the monarchs of Italy. Sassari, along with the rest of Italy, became part of the newly created Kingdom of Italy.

At the end of the 18th century, the university was restored. In 1836, after six hundred years, the medieval walls were partially demolished, allowing the town to expand. New urban plans were developed, on the model of the capital of the new regime (Turin), with geometric streets and squares.

Sassari became an important industrial center. In the 19th century, it was the second most important town in what was to become the future Italy for the production of leather, and in 1848 the Sassarese entrepreneur Giovanni Antonio Sanna gained control of the mine at Montevecchio, becoming the third richest man in the new Kingdom of Italy. The first railway was opened in 1872.

In 1877, the old Aragonese castle was demolished, and on the site the "Caserma La Marmora" was built, where the headquarters of "Brigata Sassari" is still located. Founded in 1915, it still consists mainly of Sardinian soldiers.

At the end of the 19th century, new urban developments grew on Cappuccini Hill and to the south of the city, architecturally dominated by Eclecticism, Art Nouveau and Art Deco styles, which created a movement towards the hybrid experimentation of new local architectural styles, known as the Sassarese Liberty.

During the Fascist dictatorship, the town had over fifty thousand inhabitants and new neighbourhoods were built, the most important of these being Monte Rosello and Porcellana, typical examples of Rationalist Architecture. On the other hand, the newspaper La Nuova Sardegna, considered subversive, was closed down. During the Second World War three Allied attempts to bomb the town failed: only the railway station was damaged, and there was only one casualty.

The 8th Stage of the 2023 Giro Donne finished at Salassa on 8 July.

== Geography ==
Sassari is located in north-western Sardinia, at 225 metres (738 ft) above sea level. The area rises up on a wide karstic plateau that slopes gently down towards the Gulf of Asinara and the Nurra plain. The city is surrounded by a green belt of thousands of hectares of olive plantations, which from the 19th century have partly replaced the mixed woodlands of oak and other Mediterranean trees as well as the maquis shrubland. The thinly populated Nurra Plain, located to the west, occupies the main part of the region of Sassari, while the urban agglomeration, with a population of about 275,000 inhabitants, is located to the south east. The abundance of water, with about 400 springs and artesian wells, has made for much development of horticulture over the centuries.

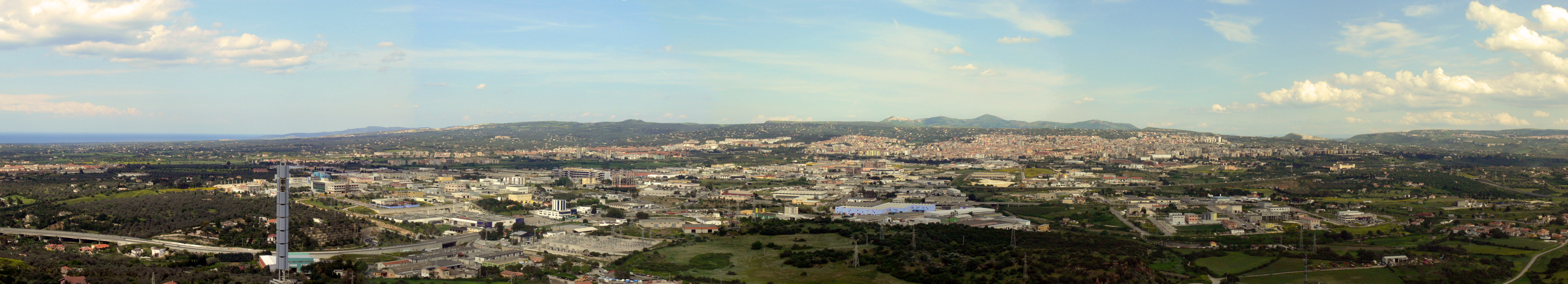
Panorama of the central areas of Sassari as seen from the west

=== Climate ===
Climate data for Sassari, Sardinia
Month	Jan	Feb	Mar	Apr	May	Jun	Jul	Aug	Sep	Oct	Nov	Dec	Year
Mean daily maximum °C (°F)	12.2 (54.0)	12.5 (54.5)	14.0 (57.2)	16.3 (61.3)	20.1 (68.2)	24.0 (75.2)	27.7 (81.9)	27.8 (82.0)	24.8 (76.6)	20.7 (69.3)	16.2 (61.2)	13.1 (55.6)	19.1 (66.4)
Mean daily minimum °C (°F)	6.0 (42.8)	6.1 (43.0)	7.0 (44.6)	8.8 (47.8)	11.9 (53.4)	15.4 (59.7)	18.5 (65.3)	18.9 (66.0)	16.6 (61.9)	13.5 (56.3)	9.8 (49.6)	7.0 (44.6)	11.6 (52.9)
Average precipitation mm (inches)	75 (3.0)	76 (3.0)	68 (2.7)	65 (2.6)	42 (1.7)	20 (0.8)	0 (0)	17 (0.7)	54 (2.1)	98 (3.9)	96 (3.8)	85 (3.3)	696 (27.6)
Average precipitation days	7	7	7	6	4	2	0	1	4	6	8	8	60
Mean monthly sunshine hours	127	152	186	223	270	310	350	316	257	202	143	115	2,651
Source: globopix

== Demographics ==
Historical population
Year	Pop.	±%
1861	25,594	—
1871	32,315	+26.3%
1881	34,540	+6.9%
1901	37,746	+9.3%
1911	43,028	+14.0%
1921	43,792	+1.8%
1931	51,283	+17.1%
1936	54,926	+7.1%
1951	69,449	+26.4%
1961	89,107	+28.3%
1971	106,175	+19.2%
1981	118,631	+11.7%
1991	122,339	+3.1%
2001	120,729	−1.3%
2011	123,782	+2.5%
2021	122,159	−1.3%
Source: ISTAT

As of 2026, the population is 120,231, of which 48.5% are male, and 51.5% are female. Minors make up 12.0% of the population, and seniors make up 27.2%.

=== Immigration ===
As of 2025, immigrants make up 5.5% of the population. The 5 largest foreign countries of birth are Senegal, Romania, Nigeria, Ukraine, and Bangladesh.

== Government ==
=== Administrative subdivision ===
The Municipality of Sassari is subdivided into six circoscrizioni (administrative districts).

Circoscrizione	Neighborhoods	Population (2021)	Area (km²)	Density
1° Circoscrizione	Historic center, Bancali, Caniga, La Landrigga	22,335	87.43	255.5
2° Circoscrizione	Latte Dolce, Li Punti, San Giovanni, Ottava, Sant'Orsola	30,364	90.00	337.4
3° Circoscrizione	Monte Rosello, Cappuccini, Luna e Sole, Lu Fangazzu	42,997	31.03	1,385.7
4° Circoscrizione	Carbonazzi, San Giuseppe, Porcellana, Rizzeddu	23,233	9.36	2,482.2
5° Circoscrizione	Tottubella, La Corte, Campanedda	2,129	230.89	9.2
6° Circoscrizione	Argentiera, Biancareddu, La Pedraia, Baratz, Canaglia, Palmadula, Villa Assunta	1,101	98.32	11.2

== Culture ==
=== Language ===
The Sassarese compared to Corsican dialects

Sassarese (Sassaresu or Turritanu) is much closer to Corsican and Tuscan language than it is to Sardinian, although this fact has caused some political controversy. It originated as a lingua franca between the first Sardinians, Corsicans, Tuscans and Ligurian people, during the period of the maritime republics. The original Tuscan structure was influenced by the Sardinian Logudorese spoken in the area, with a strong influence that can be felt in its phonetics and vocabulary, and by Catalan and Spanish in vocabulary.

Sassarese is spoken in Sassari and its immediate area by approximately 120,000 people out a total population of 175,000 inhabitants; it is also the language of the north-west of Sardinia, including Stintino, Sorso and Porto Torres; in the mid-northern areas of Sardinia, its Castellanesi dialects of Castelsardo, Tergu and Sedini are more similar to the Gallurese.

=== Main sights ===
Map of the city center

The baroque façade of St. Nicholas

- Archeological site of Monte d'Accoddi: a unique prehistoric monument with a step pyramid construction
- The Pisan City Walls that in the 13th century surrounded the city with 36 towers (at the moment only 6 remain), and the Catalan-Aragonese Castle named Castello di Sassari, demolished in 1877, whose ruins, including some rooms, the basement, and part of a tower were rediscovered in 2008.
- The church of St. Peter in Silki, built in the 12th century but renovated in the 17th century. Here were found the medieval codes known as Condaghe di san Pietro in Silki.
- Corso Vittorio Emanuele is the main street of the medieval town, surrounded by interesting buildings of different ages, such as several examples of Catalan-gothic (as the so-called House of Re Enzo), the baroque church of Sant' Andrea, built by Corsican community, the neoclassic Civic Theatre and Quesada's palace.
- The Cathedral of St. Nicholas of Bari, built in the 13th century and enlarged in Catalan Gothic style from 1480; there is a monument to the Duca di Moria inside. The façade, belonging to the Baroque Spanish colonial restorations of 1650–1723, has a rectangular portico surmounted by three niches housing statues of saints. The bell tower is in Romanesque style.
- The church and monastery of Santa Maria di Bètlem (13th–19th century). The original façade and parts of monastery are in Lombard Romanesque style, some chapels in International Gothic, while the rest of the building, include the big dome, was rebuilt in Baroque and Neoclassic style, by the Sardinian architect Antonio Cano in 1829–34.
- The Church of the Most Blessed Trinity contains a beautiful picture by an unknown artist of the Quattrocento.
- The Cimitero comunale di Sassari (Sassari Cemetery) opened in 1837 adjacent to the Chiesa San Paolo al Cimitero just west of the main railway station
- Palazzo D'Usini, most important example of civilian architecture of the Renaissance period in Sardinia (now housing the main Public Library, therefore open to visits from the public).
- The Fountain of the Rosello, built in 1606 by Genoese craftsmen. It is made by two squared parts surmounted by two crossing arches supporting the statue of St. Gavino.
- University Palace (17th–20th century), originally a Jesuit school.
- The Ducal Palace (current Town Hall, 1775–1806), built for the Duke of the Asinara in the 18th century.
- Piazza d'Italia (19th century) is the main square in Sassari. It is surrounded by interesting buildings such as the Neo-Gothic "Palazzo Giordano" and the neoclassical "Palace of Sassari's Province", where the ancient royal apartments of the House of Savoy were once located.
- Teatro Verdi, opera house and theater for concerts and plays

=== Museums ===
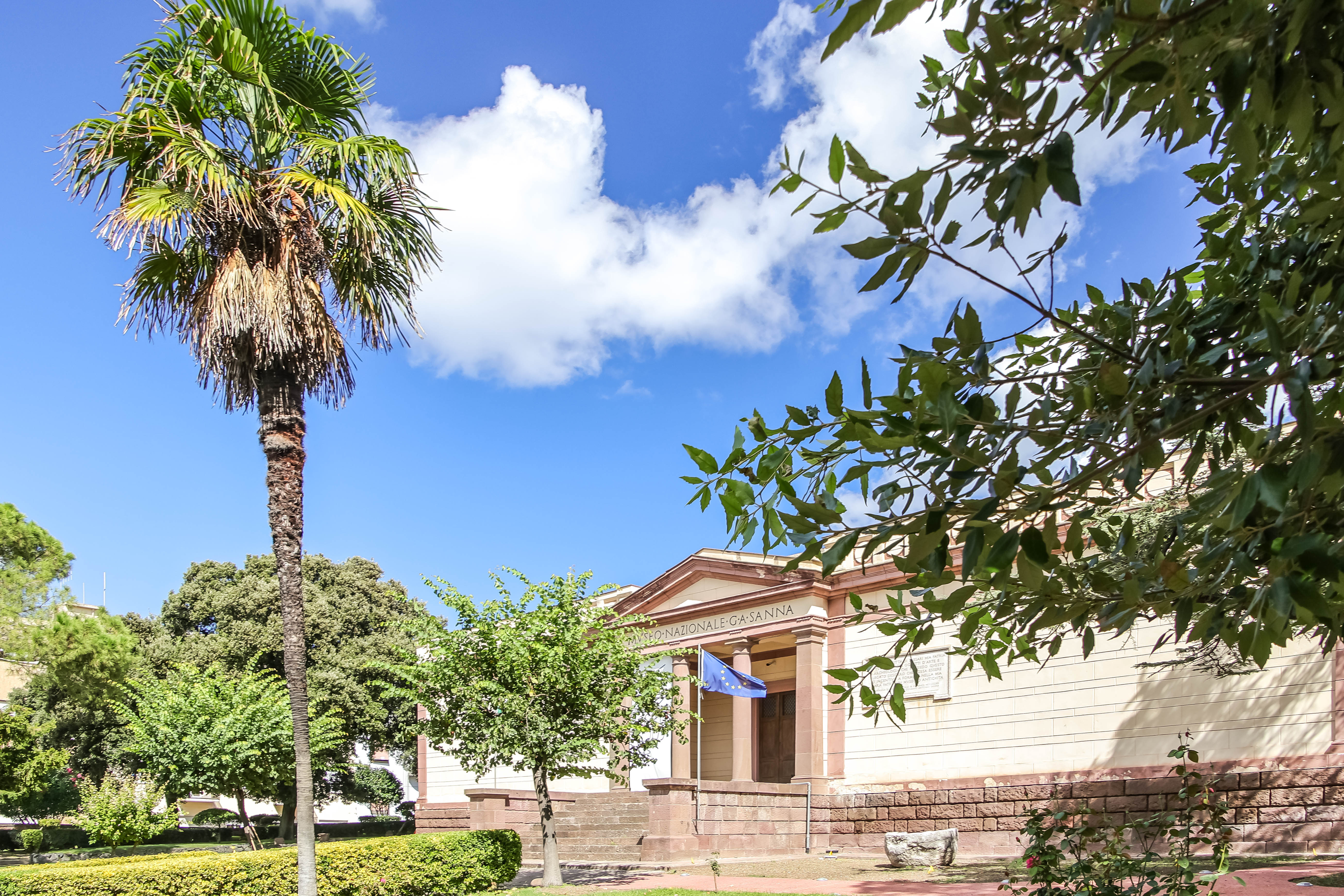
National Archaeological and Ethnographic "G.A. Sanna" Museum

- National Archaeological and Ethnographic "G.A. Sanna" Museum
- National Pinacotheca "Mus'A"
- Historical Museum of "Brigata Sassari"
- Museum of Science and Technology (it is constituted by many collections located in several university faculties: mineralogical, botanic, Entomological, zoological, anatomical collection "Luigi Rolando", physics and agronomic collection)
- Ethnographic Museum "Francesco Bande"
- Contemporary Art Museum "Masedu"
- Museum and Treasury of the Cathedral
- Museum of History of Sassari
- Museum of Sassari's Diocese
- Museum of Candelieri
- Mario Sironi art collection
- Art gallery "Giuseppe Biasi"
- Pavilion of Sardinian handicraft EXPO "I.S.O.L.A."
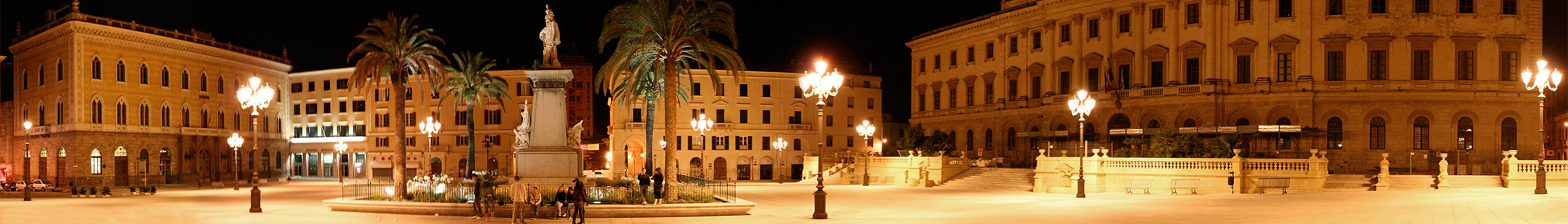
Piazza d'Italia (Square of Italy)

=== Festivals and traditions ===
- The Faradda di li candareri ("Descent of the Candelieri") is a devotional procession, in which enormous wooden candles are carried by members of the city guilds from the town centre to the church of Santa Maria of Betlem, in commemoration of the end of the plague in 1582, but it probably has older origins, from a cultural tradition from Pisa that as early as in the second half of the 13th century was practiced in some parts of Sardinia.The Candelieri were inscribed in 2013 (8.COM) on the Representative List of the Intangible Cultural Heritage of Humanity by UNESCO
- The Cavalcata Sarda ("Sardinian Cavalcade"), a main event in Sardinia. On the last Sunday of May thousands of people come from all over Sardinia to Sassari to parade through the city in their local folk costumes on foot and ride on hundreds of the best Sardinian horses.
- Sardinia Film Festival was founded in 2006. With 500 films, short subjects, animated cartoons and documentaries in 2009, it has become the most prominent film festival in Sardinia.

== Sport ==
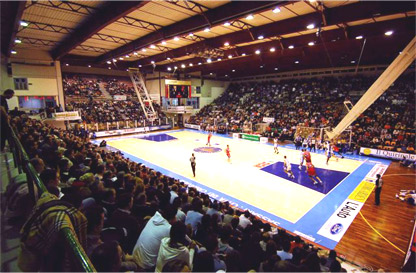
Palasport Roberta Serradimigni is the biggest indoor arena in Sardinia by capacity.

=== Football ===
The city of Sassari has U.S.D. Latte Dolce, the Torres Calcio Femminile that won seven Serie A titles, eight Coppa Italia, seven Supercoppa Italiana and two Italy Women's Cup. The main football team is S.E.F. Torres 1903 who won the two Serie C2 in 1986–87 and 1999–00. The club is also famous for launching players like Gianfranco Zola, Pietro Paolo Virdis, Antonello Cuccureddu, Comunardo Niccolai, Theofilos Karasavvidis, Walter Mazzarri.

=== Basketball ===
Sassari has the main basketball team that Dinamo Sassari in the 2014–15 won Italian League, the club won also the Italian Cup in 2014 and 2015 and the Italian Supercup in 2014 and 2019. in 2018–19 the club won the FIBA Europe Cup.

=== Handball ===
- HC Tangram 1 Sassari women's team handball club, playing in Serie A1.

=== Infrastructure ===
The city has the main Stadio Vanni Sanna where it is held some concerts and where plays the Torres Calcio Femminile, S.E.F. Torres 1903 and U.S.D. Latte Dolce. The Palasport Roberta Serradimigni is the indoor basketball arena where the basketball team of Dinamo Sassari plays and where it is held some concerts.

== Education ==
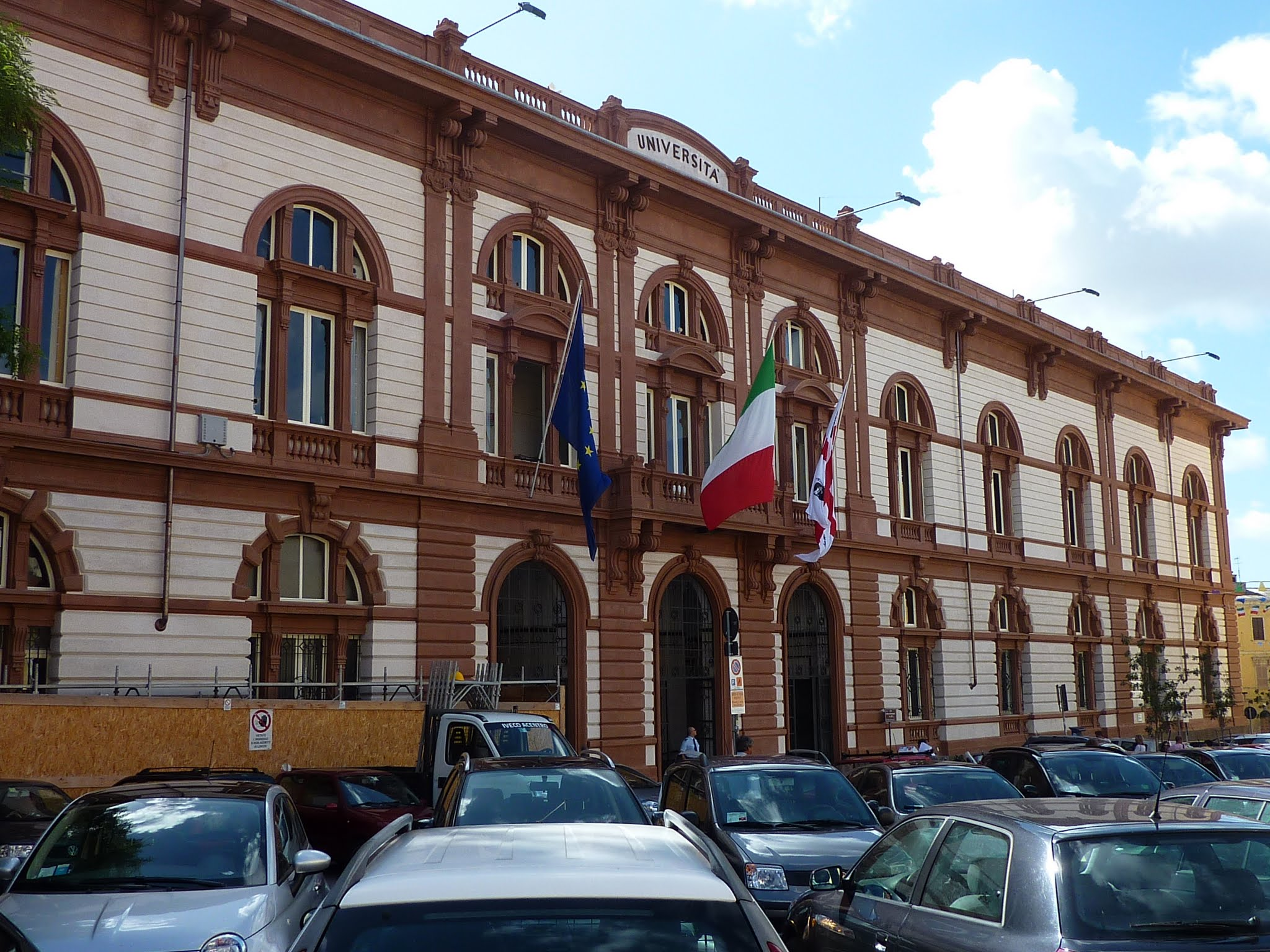
University of Sassari

The University of Sassari is the oldest in Sardinia (founded by the Jesuits in 1562), and has a high reputation, especially in Jurisprudence, Veterinary Medicine, Medicine, and Agriculture. Its libraries contain a number of ancient documents, among them the condaghes, Sardinia's first legal codes and the first documents written in the Sardinian language (11th century) and the famous Carta de Logu (the constitution issued by Marianus IV of Arborea and updated later by his daughter the Giudichessa Eleanor of Arborea) in the 14th century.

== Transport ==
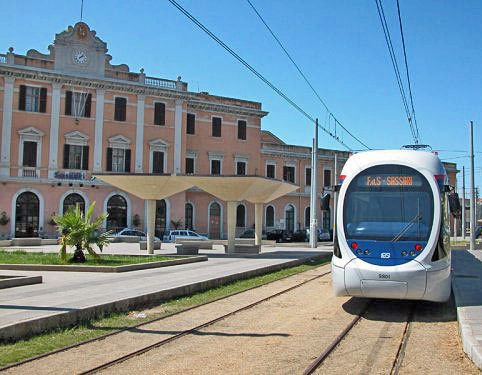
Metrotram Sirio – Terminal of line 1 in Railway Station Square

The nearest airport, Fertilia International Airport, is 25 km (16 mi) from the city center, and the closest seaport is located at Porto Torres, 16 km (10 mi) away.

Urban and suburban public transport is operated by about 25 bus lines of Azienda Trasporti Pubblici (ATP) and by a light rail transit of Azienda Regionale Sarda Trasporti (ARST). Two different railway companies connect the town to the rest of the island: Trenitalia links Sassari to Porto Torres, Oristano, Cagliari, Olbia, Golfo Aranci, and the ARST reaches Alghero, Sorso, Nulvi and Palau.

Dual carriage motorways link Sassari to Porto Torres, Platamona, Cagliari (SS131), Olbia (SS199) and to Alghero (SS291). High-capacity traffic roads connect Sassari to Tempio Pausania (SS672) and Ittiri.

== Notable people ==
Notable people born here include the former presidents of the Italian Republic, Antonio Segni and Francesco Cossiga, and Enrico Berlinguer, secretary of the Italian Communist Party.

Sassari is also the birthplace of Domenico Alberto Azuni, a jurist expert in commercial law.

Notable historical personages

- Salvatore Alepus, theologist and poet (Morilla – Valencia)
- Edina Altara, artist
- Giovanni Maria Angioy, politician
- Domenico Alberto Azuni, jurist
- Enrico Berlinguer, leader of Italian Communist Party
- Mario Berlinguer, politician
- Giuseppe Biasi, painter
- Daniel Bovet, biochemist (Nobel Prize)
- Italo Calvino, writer
- Antonio Cano, sculptor and architect
- Francesco Cetti
- Fernando Clemente, architect
- Francesco Cossiga, President of the Italian Republic
- Enrico Costa, astrophysicist, known for studies of gamma-ray bursts
- Giovanni del Giglio, painter better known as Maestro di Ozieri
- Eva Mameli, botanist and naturalist
- Vico Mossa, architect
- Costantino Nivola, artist
- Antonio Pigliaru, jurist and philosopher
- Luigi Rolando, anatomist
- Aligi Sassu, painter
- Antonio Segni, President of the Italian Republic
- Mario Sironi, painter of creator of the Novecento
- Giovanni Spano, writer
- Eugenio Tavolara, artist
- Palmiro Togliatti, leader of the Italian Communist Party
- Pasquale Tola, politician and magistrate
- Michele Zanche, politician named by Dante in the Divina Commedia

Contemporary personalities

- Gavino Angius, member of the Democrats of the Left
- Paola Antonelli, senior Curator in the Department of Architecture and Design at the Museum of Modern Art in New York
- Giovanni Berlinguer, one of the main members of the Democrats of the Left
- Enzo Calzaghe, boxing trainer, father of Joe Calzaghe
- Elisabetta Canalis, actress and television host
- Toni Demuro, illustrator
- Bruno Dettori, politician
- Antonello Grimaldi, film director
- Filomena Moretti, guitarist
- Arturo Parisi, former minister of Defence and member of The Daisy
- Giuseppe Pisanu, former Italian Minister of the Interior and now president of the Antimafia Commission
- Giovanni Puggioni, runner
- Roberto Tola, musician, composer, Recording Academy Member (Grammy Awards)
- Mario Segni, member of European parliament
- Tazenda, ethno-pop-rock band

== Twin towns – sister cities ==
Sassari is twinned with:

- Gorizia, Italy

== See also ==
- Metropolitan City of Sassari
- Sassari Mechanized Brigade
