= Barratry =

Barratry is a legal term with several meanings. It can refer to:

- Simony, its original meaning in English, along with the sale of public offices.
- Barratry (common law), litigation for the purpose of harassment or profit
- Ambulance chasing, when a lawyer seeks clients at a disaster site
- Barratry (admiralty law), misconduct by crew of a ship resulting in its damage
- Barratry, an old name for graft (politics)
