= Toni Demuro =

Italian illustrator

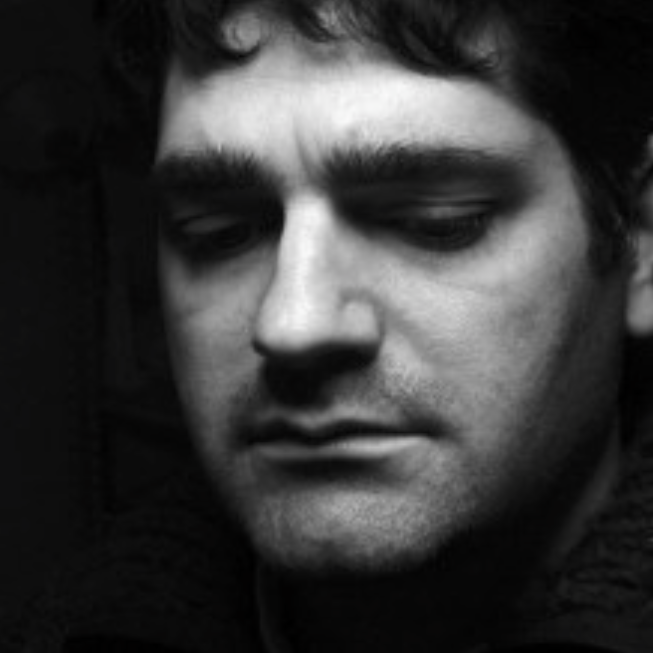
Toni Demuro in 2012

Toni Demuro is an Italian illustrator.

== Biography ==
In 1997, he graduated in painting at the Academy of Fine Arts in Sassari and since then has worked as a creative in the field of visual arts and design.

In 1996, he won the "Acquaviva nei Fumetti" award.

He has collaborated with The Washington Post, Penguin Books, The Boston Globe, Atlanta Magazine, Rádio Londres Editora, Sarbacane, Éditions Héloïse d'Ormesson, Sellerio, Mondadori, Corriere della Sera, Vanity Fair, TukMusic.

In 2014, he created the cover of the album "Jazzy Christmas" by the musician Paolo Fresu.

In 2017, he produced the covers of three books by Roald Dahl, "The Wonderful Story of Henry Sugar and Six More", "The Great Automatic Grammatizator" and "Skin and Other Stories" published by Penguin Books.

== Works ==
=== Album ===
==== Works originally published in French ====
- 2019, Savane, haïkus pour les enfants, Editions Un Chat la nuit
- 2019, Chaumièr, Editions La Palissade
- 2018, Des ours dans la maison, Editions D'Orbestier
- 2018, Quand je marche dans le désert, Editions Les Minots
- 2017, La coccinelle – Haïkus pour les enfants, Editions Sarbacane
- 2016, Quand je marche en forêt, Editions Les Minots
- 2015, L'oiseau qui avait avalé une étoile, La Palissade
- 2015, Le Bidule, Editions D'orbestier
- 2014, Célestin rêve, Editions D'orbestier
- 2013, La Cheneuille, Editions D'orbestier

== Awards ==
- 2017, Prix Michel Tournier jeunesse
- 2017, Prix Atout lire
- 2017, Sélectionné Prix du livre Versailles jeunesse
- 2017, Sélectionné Prix des incorruptibles
- 2016, Prix Jeunesse de la Ville du Touquet-Paris-Plage
- 2016, Prix Gayant Lecture
- 1996, Premio "Acquaviva sui fumetti”
