= Bosa =

- Comune
- Comune di Bosa
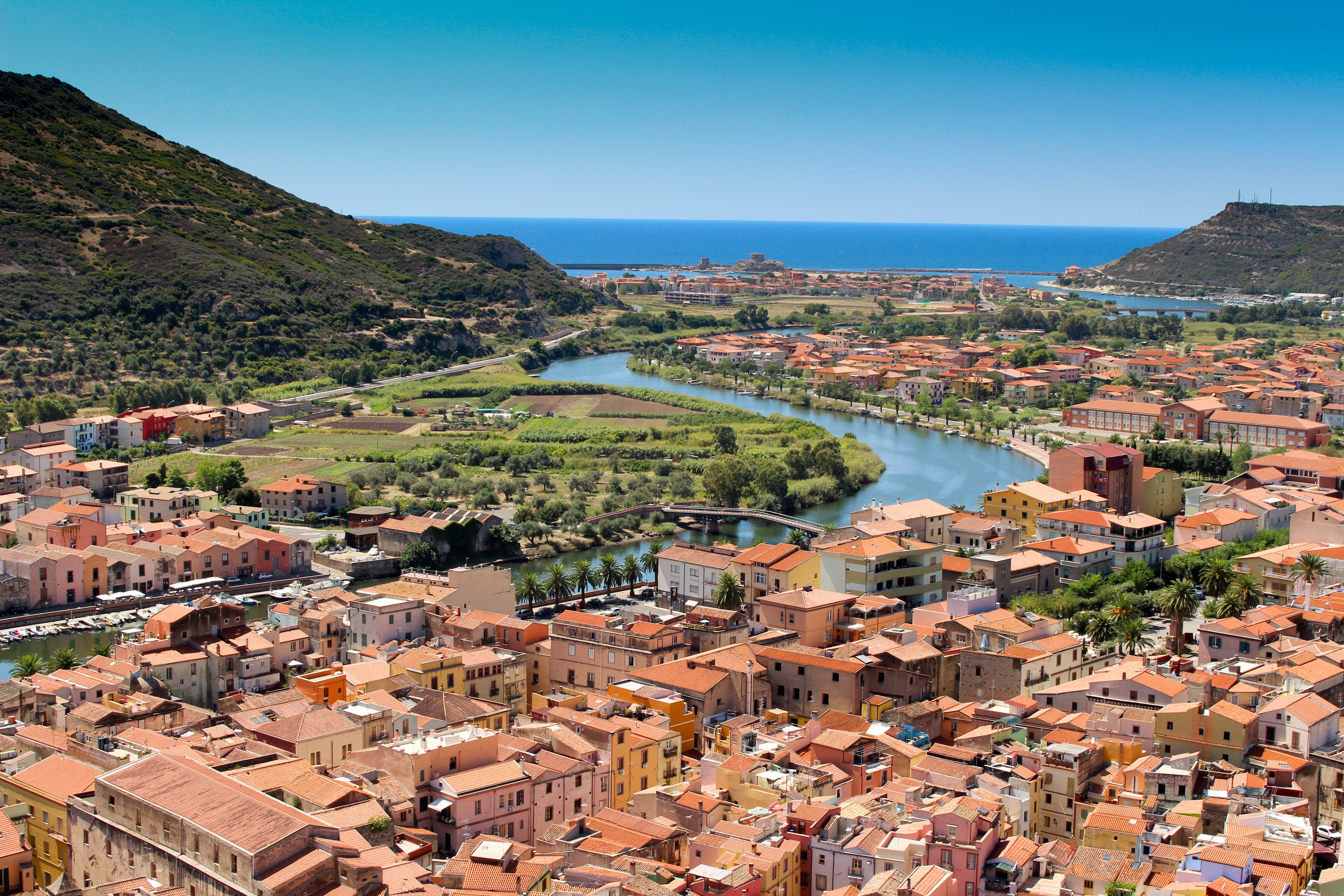
- view of Bosa from the Serravalle's Castle

- Coat of arms

- Location within Sardinia
- Coordinates: 40°18′N 8°30′E
- Country: Italy
- Region: Sardinia
- Province: Oristano (OR)
- Frazioni: Bosa Marina

Government
  - Mayor: Alfonso Marras

Area
  - Total: 135.67 km^{2} (52.38 sq mi)
- Elevation: 2 m (6.6 ft)

Population (1 January 2009)
  - Total: 8,126
  - Density: 59.90/km^{2} (155.1/sq mi)
- Demonym(s): Bosani; Bosincos
- Time zone: UTC+1 (CET)
  - Summer (DST): UTC+2 (CEST)
- Postal code: 09089
- Dialing code: 0785
- ISTAT code: 095079
- Patron saint: St. Emilius and Priamus
- Saint day: May 28
- Website: Official website

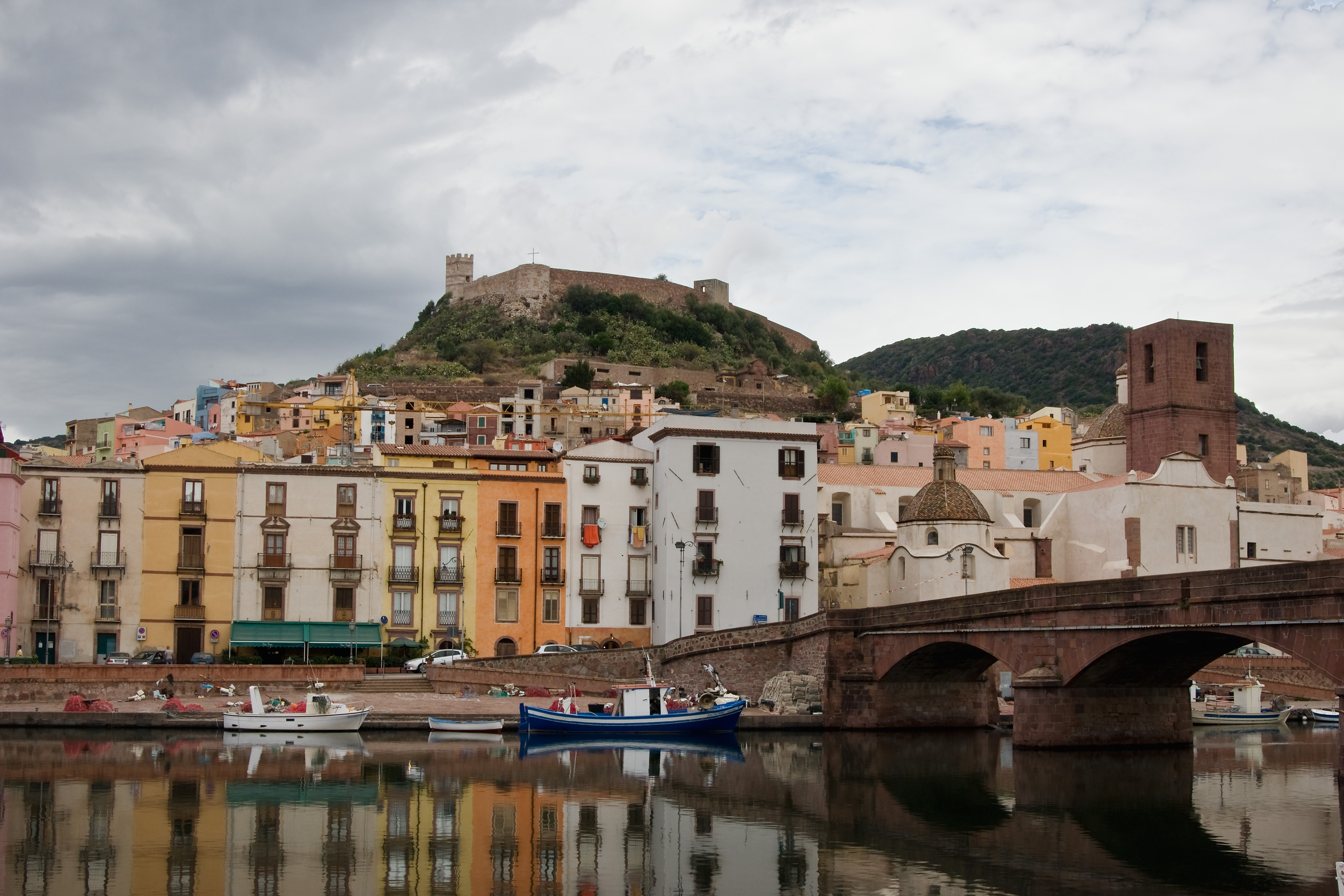
Bosa and its castle seen from the river Temo

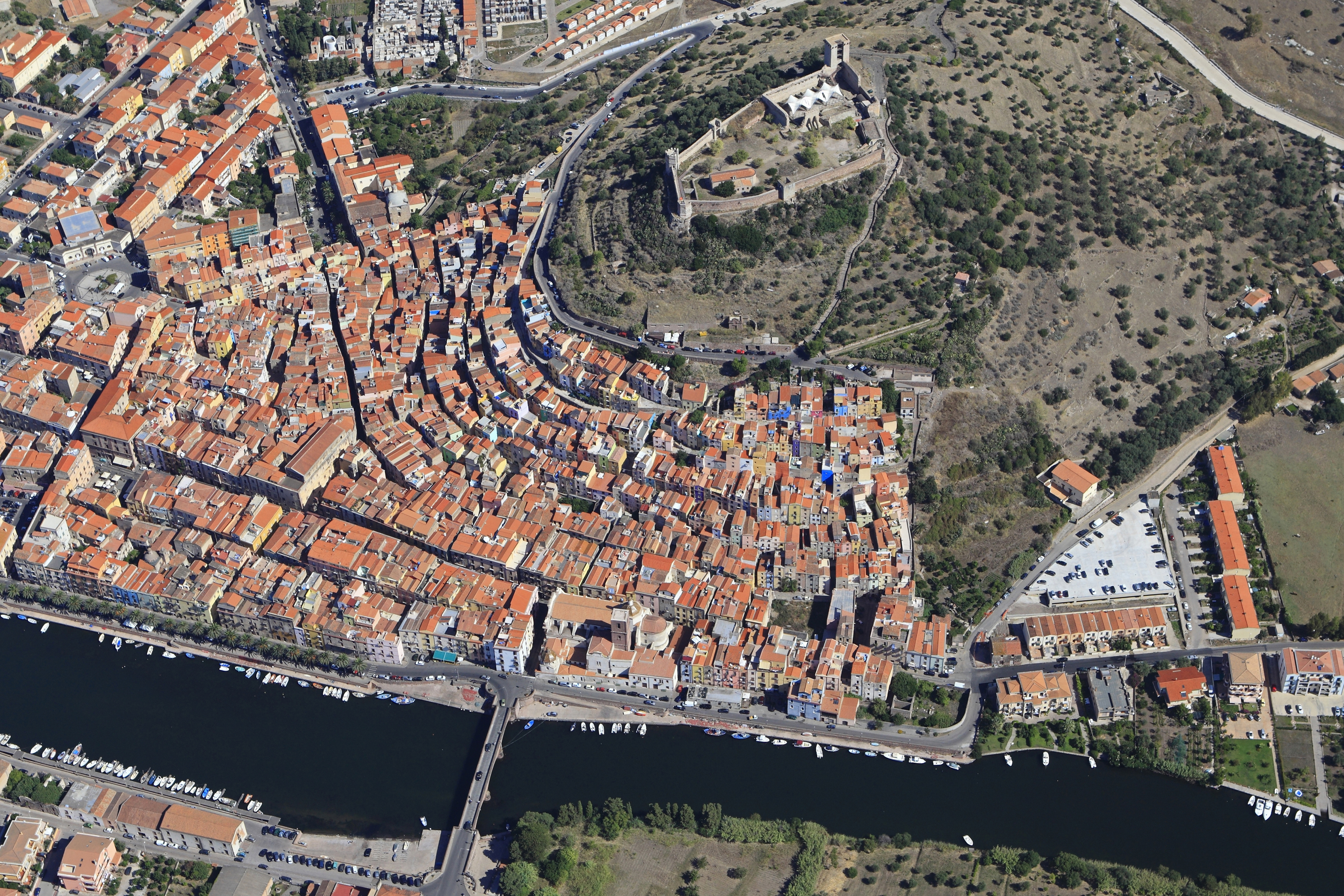
An aerial view of Bosa

Bosa is a town and comune in the province of Oristano (until May 2005 it was in the province of Nuoro), part of the Sardinia region of Italy. Bosa is situated about two-thirds of the way up the west coast of Sardinia, on a small hill, about 3 kilometres (2 miles) inland on the north bank of the Temo River. It is the only town on the island of Sardinia built on the banks of a river. The town has maintained a population of around 8,000 people for a significant amount of time, but has an urban character that has differentiated it from other locations in Sardinia. It is one of I Borghi più belli d'Italia ("The most beautiful villages of Italy"). Agriculture and fishing play an important part in the city economy, thanks to the river valley near the coast surrounded by hills and highland plateaus.

== History ==
The area was inhabited since prehistorical times, as attested by the presence of several domus de janas and nuraghe. It was probably founded by the Phoenicians, although little is known about the original settlement. Under the Romans it was a municipium. The present town of Bosa was founded in 13th century by the Malaspina family, 2.5 km (1.5 miles) from the site of the ancient town. In the early Middle Ages, as part of the Giudicato of Logudoro, it was a provincial capital. After the construction of the Malaspina Castle, the population gradually moved from the seaside to the hills.

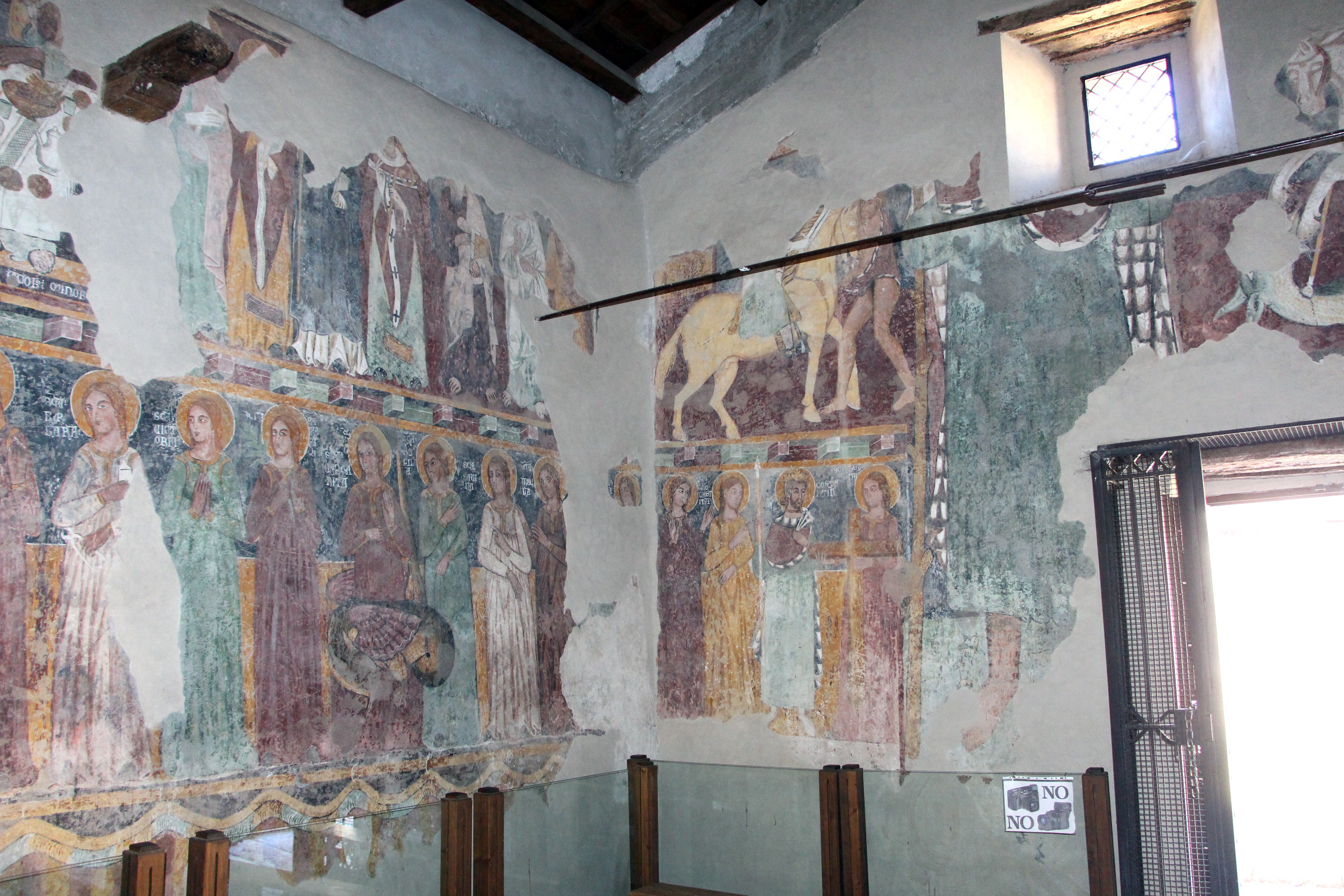
14th frescoes in the church situated within the Malaspina Castle

It remained in the hands of the Malaspina until the 14th century, when it was taken over by the Crown of Aragon. Along with the rest of Sardinia, it was later ruled by Spain. For a short period in between, it was a part of the Giudicato of Arborea.

Bosa is known for a classical way of saying: you do like they do in Bosa: if it rains, they let it rain.

== Museums ==
While smaller than Sardinia's major cities, Bosa offers several museums and cultural attractions that provide insight into the town's unique heritage and traditions. These institutions count among the essential things to see in Bosa for visitors interested in a deeper understanding of local history and craftsmanship.

=== Casa Deriu Museum ===
The Casa Deriu Museum (Museo Casa Deriu) is a 19th-century bourgeois mansion offering a look into Bosa's prosperous merchant class. The museum preserves the original furnishings, decorations, and domestic objects of a local wealthy family, providing a glimpse into daily life during Bosa's heyday.

=== Tanneries Museum ===
One of the most distinctive chapters in the history of Bosa involved its tannery industry, which flourished along the riverbanks from the Middle Ages until the early 20th century. The Tanneries Museum (Museo delle Conce) preserves this industrial heritage in the actual buildings where leather was once processed.

== Gallery ==
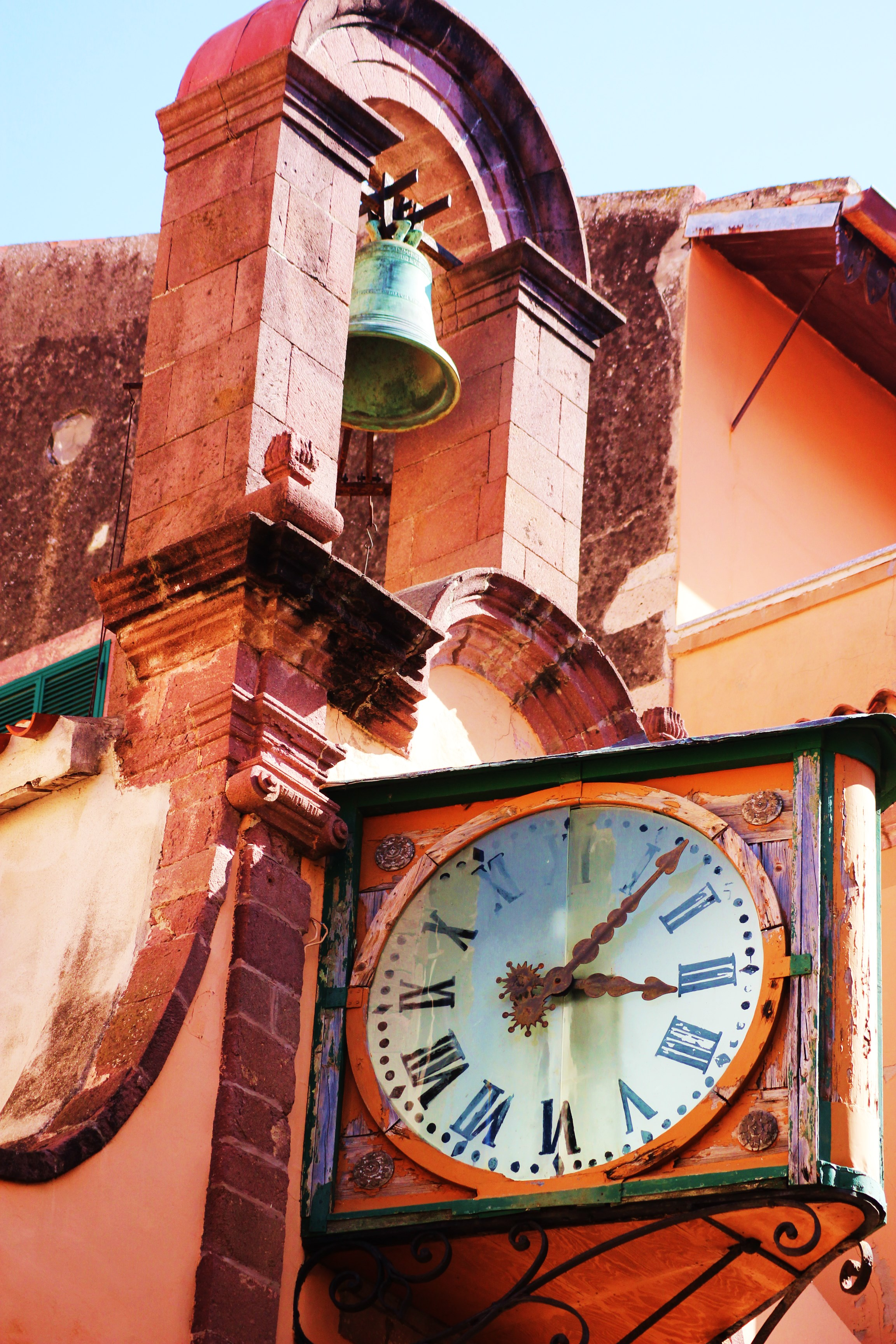
Historical City Clock

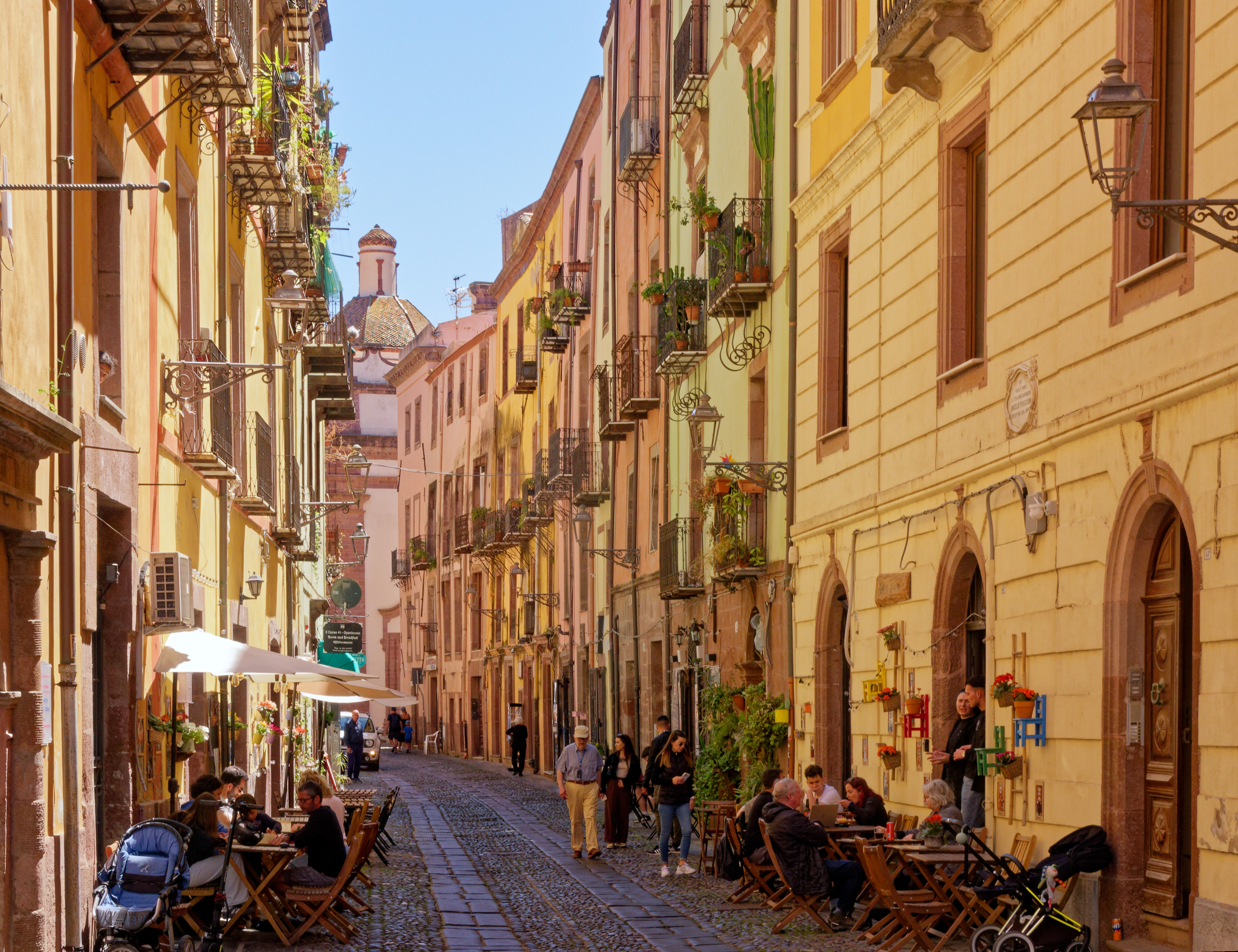
Street of Bosa

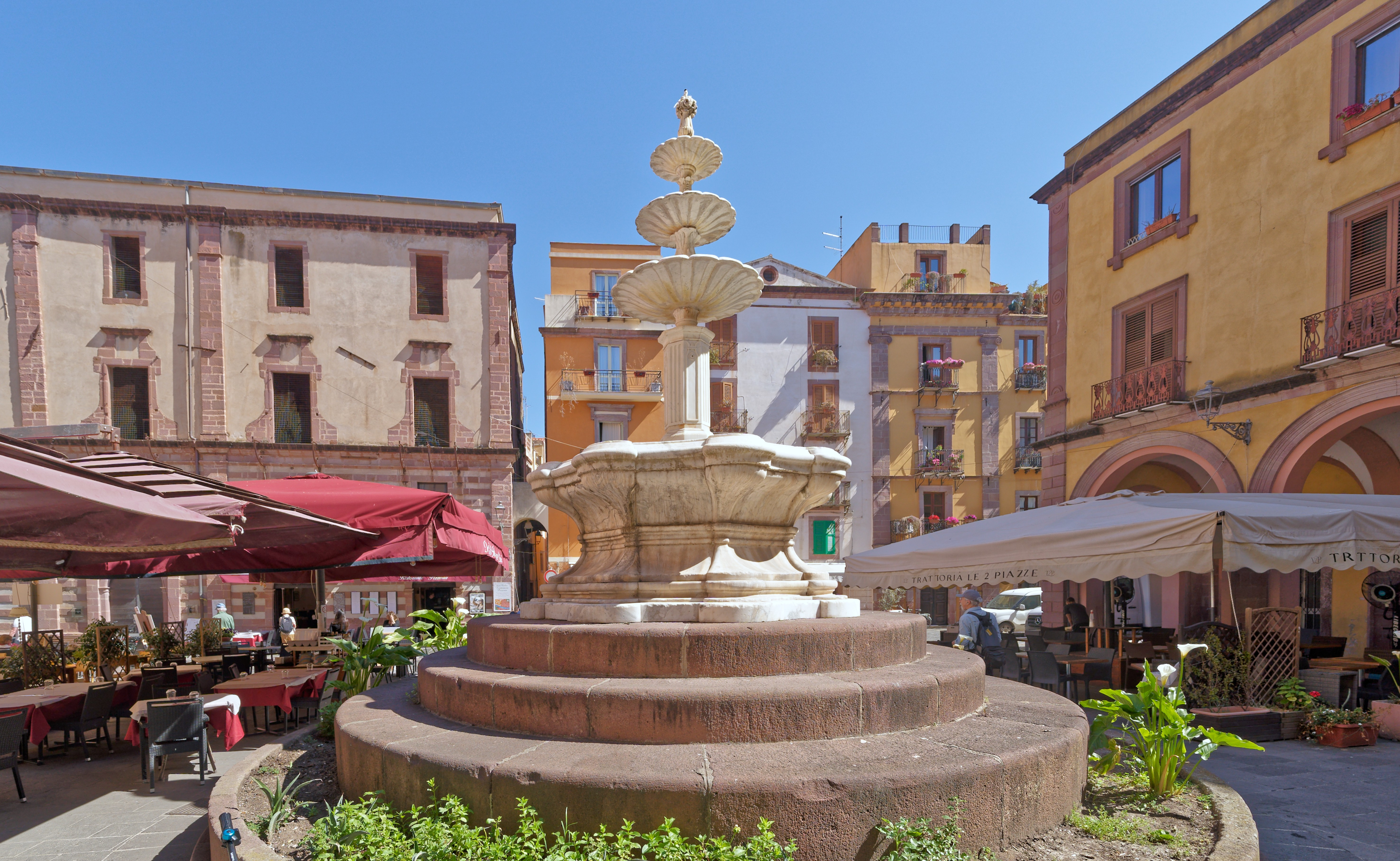
Piazza Costituzione

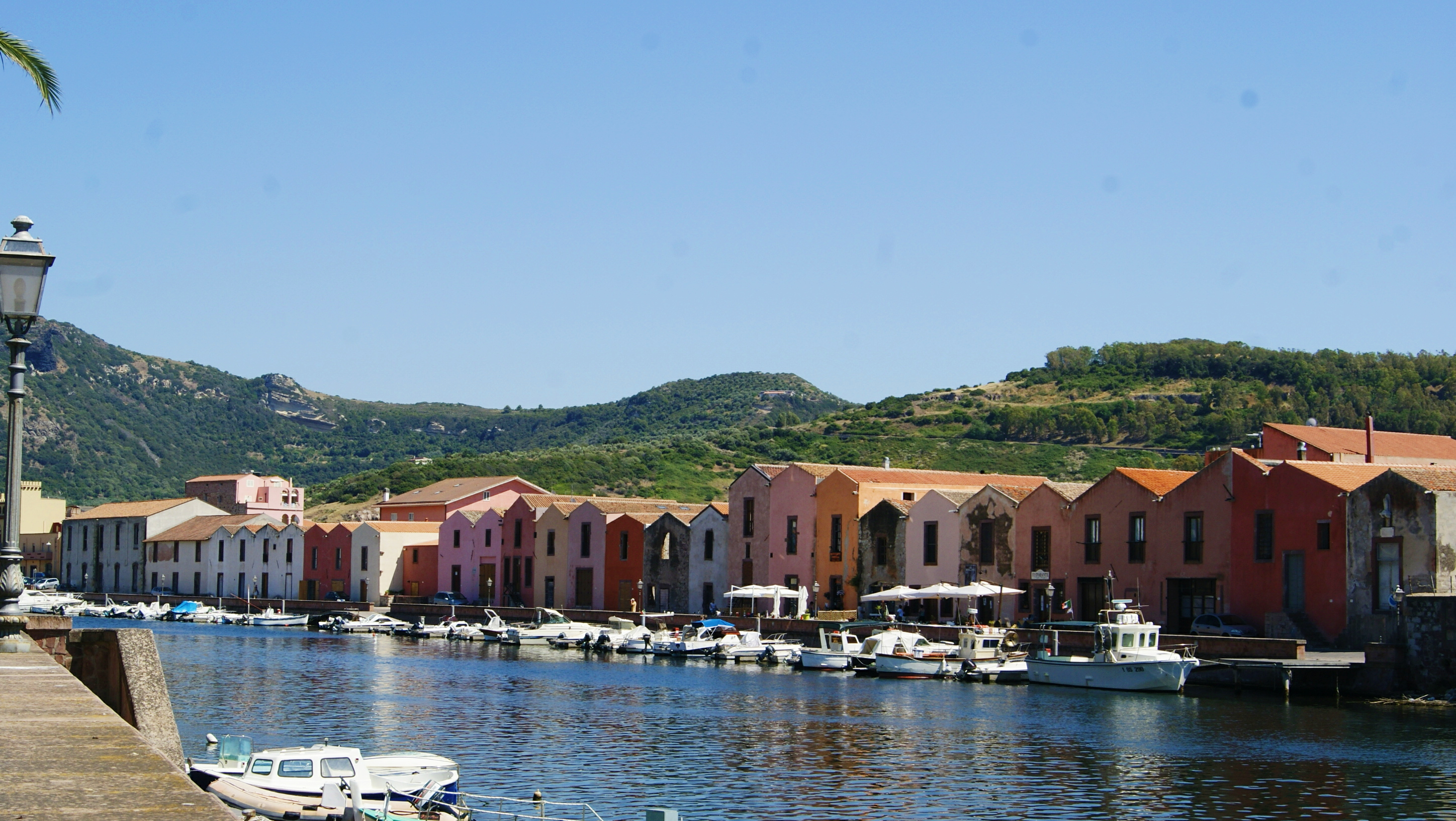
Temo river

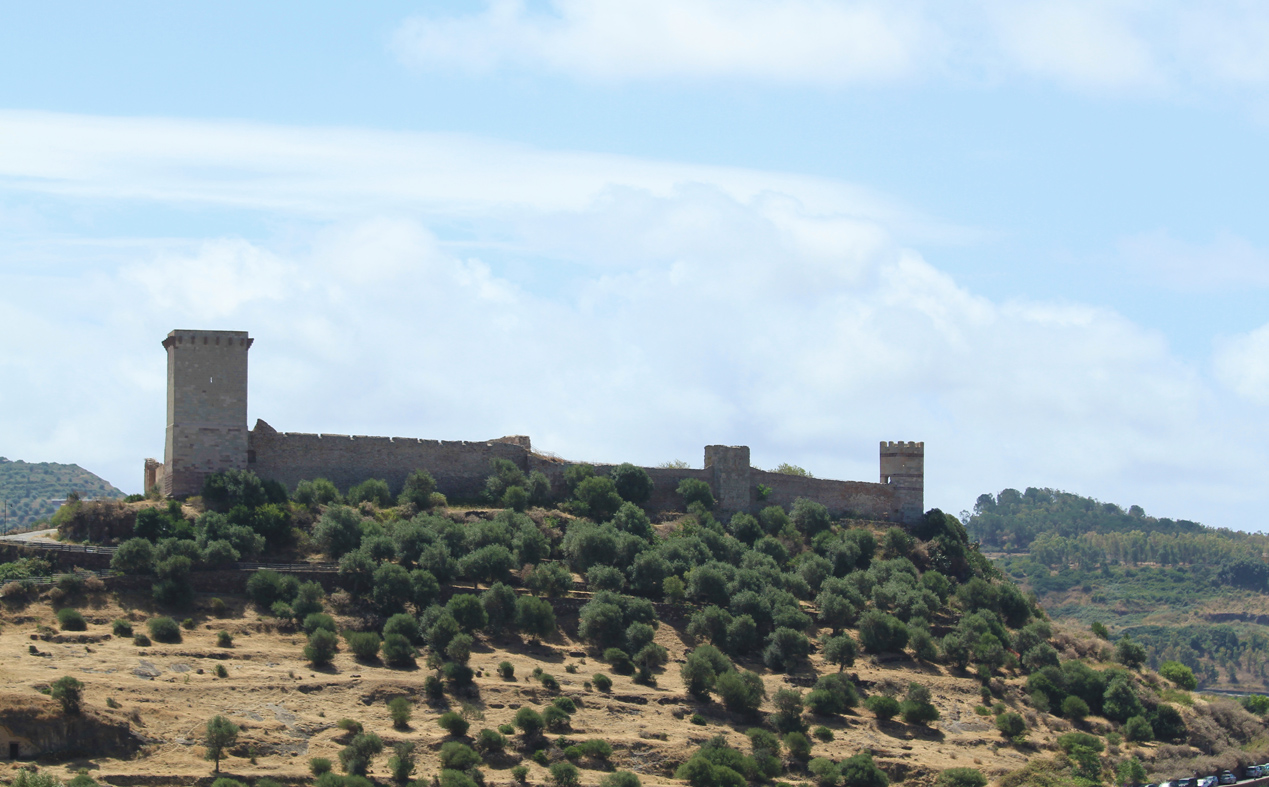
Malaspina castle

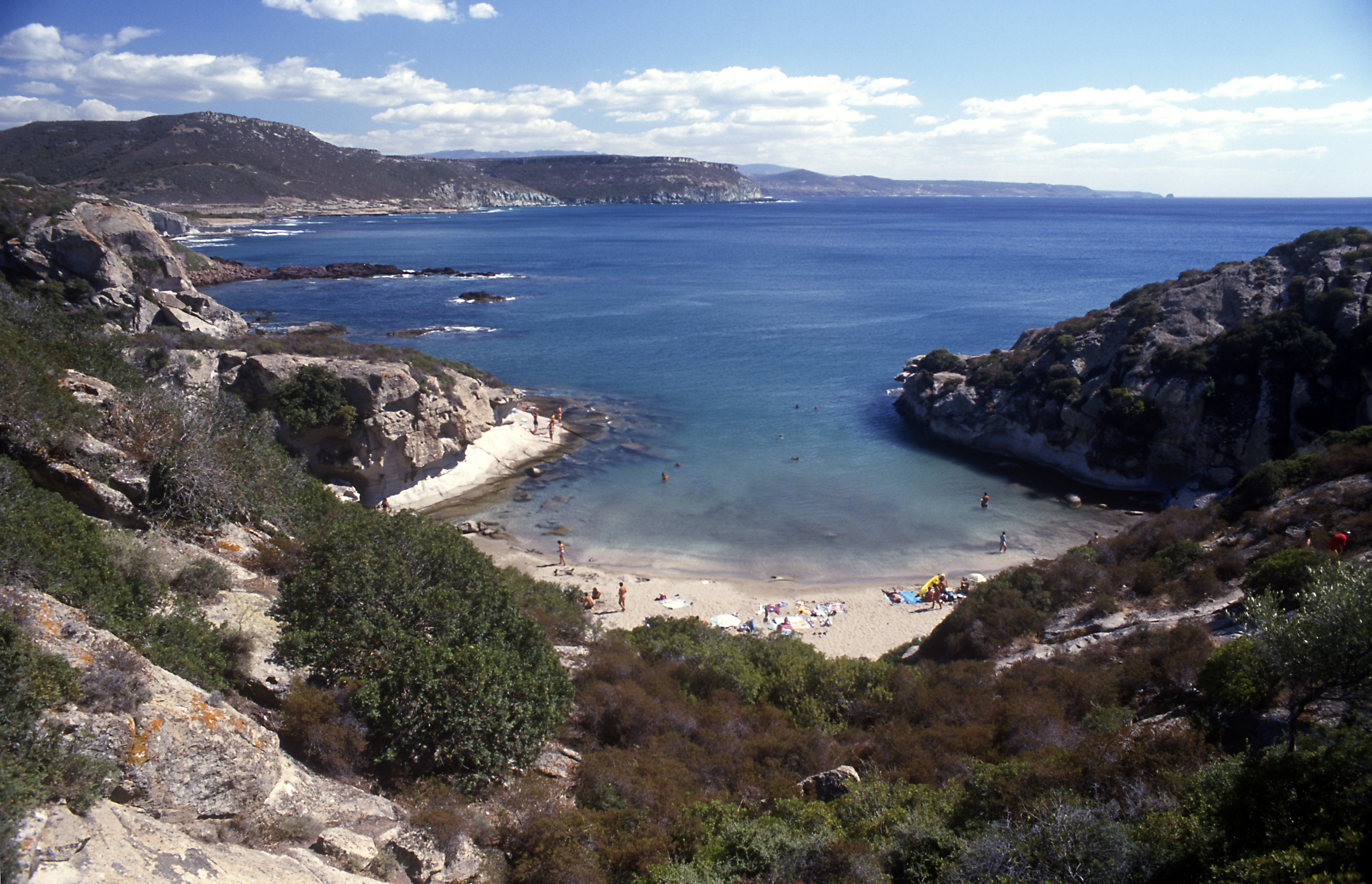
Cala Cumpoltitu
