= Sardinian literature =

The literature of Sardinia is the literary production of Sardinian authors, as well as the literary production generally referring to Sardinia as an argument, written in various languages.

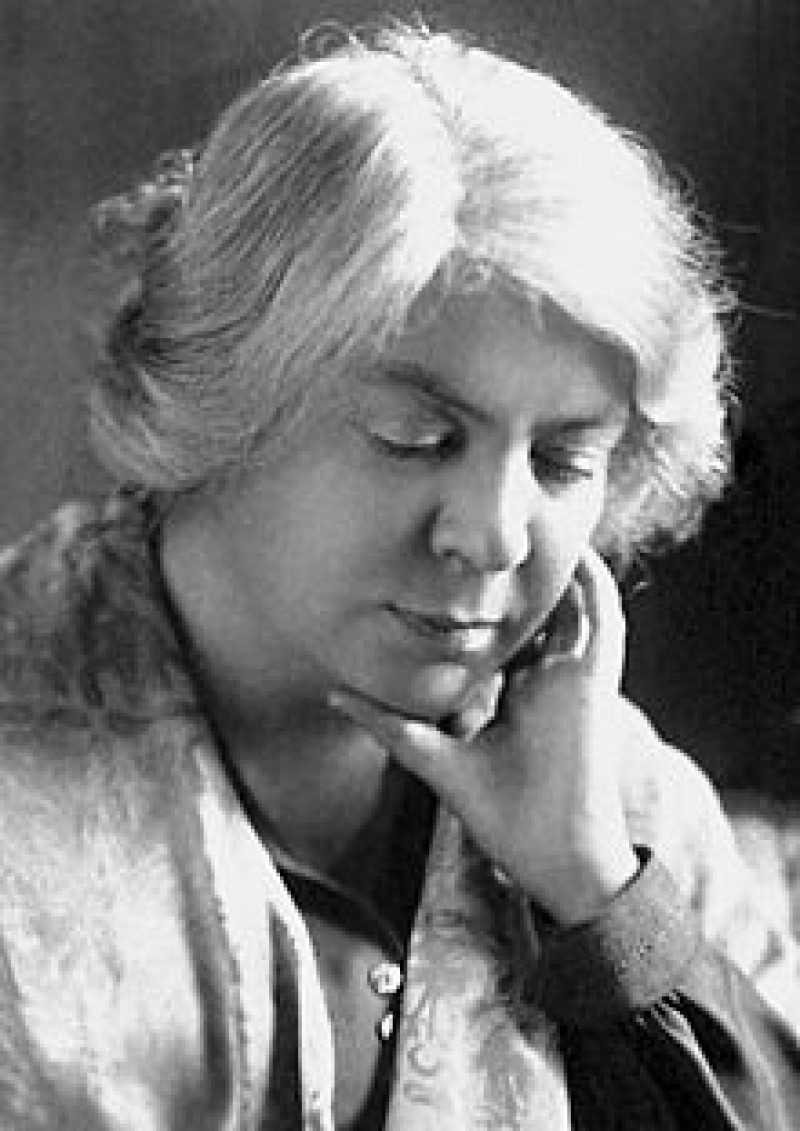
Grazia Deledda Nobel Prize in Literature in 1926

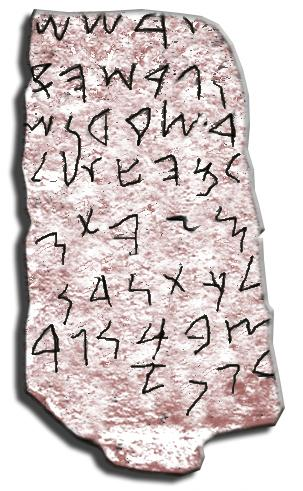
Pedra de Nuras (Nora Stone)

== The beginnings ==
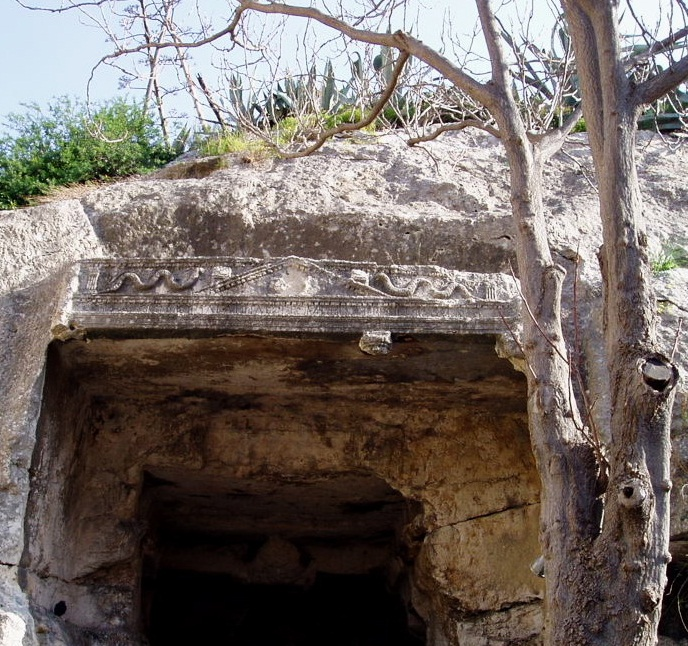
Grotta della Vipera, Cagliari (Viper grotto)

The existence and understanding of direct statements of the proto-Sardinian (pre-punic and pre-Latin) language or languages being hotly debated, the first written artifact from the island dates back to the Phoenician period with documents such as the Nora Stele or the trilingual inscription (Punic-Latin-Greek) from San Nicolò Gerrei. This last artifact symbolizes the passage of the island from a Punic cultural and linguistic influence to a Roman one. The Carthaginians took control of Sardinia around the year 500 BC, and lost it in 238 BC after the First Punic War. After that the new Roman province of Sardinia et Corsica established an almost exclusive use of written and spoken Latin for more than eight centuries, as a result of the linguistic Romanization of the entire island. After briefly being occupied by the Vandals in approximately 456, it was again taken by the Romans in 534 AD, more precisely the Byzantine Romans from the East, who gradually introduced medieval Greek at all levels of society, while the common people continued to speak a Latin dialect which evolved, after some centuries, into medieval Sardinian Romance. In this period Latin still remained the language of religious culture as the Sardinian Church was strictly related to Rome, while Greek was the language of political power, that of the very far but mighty Emperor of Costantinople. The new millennium brought an attempted conquest by Muslims, which failed on account of the fleets of Pisa and Genua, but at the same time brought a new rapprochement to western Europe, as Byzantines were no longer able to defend the farthest part of their "οικουμένη" (ecumene).

Multilingualism, as we shall see, will always be a constant in the literary history of the island: Punic, Greek, Latin, Byzantine Greek, medieval Latin, Sardinian and vernacular Tuscan, Catalan, Spanish, Sardo-Corsican, Italian, and even French were the languages which Sardinian authors used for two millennia. Of particular importance for the history and anthropology of Sardinia in Roman times, is the text of the table of Esterzili: "The find is of exceptional importance for the inscription of 27 lines with capital letters: it shows the decree by the Proconsul of Sardinia L. Elvio Agrippa March 18 69 A.D. – during the reign of the Emperor Otho – to settle a border between the populations of Patulcenses Campani and Galillenses that have repeatedly violated the limits. The proconsul in particular ordered that the Galillenses had to leave the lands occupied by force and warned them off keeping to rebel. The text ends with the names of the members of the acting council and with the seven witnesses signatures. The scientific value of the finding is having sent along with the names of two of the populations living in Roman Sardinia, a summary of the long dispute occurred between the end of the Republic and early Imperial Age (since the end of the second century. BC to the first century AD).

The earliest record of an artistic literary production in Sardinia can be found in Latin and Greek carmina, carved in the limestone of the tomb-shrine of Atilia Pomptilla, in the necropolis of Tuvixeddu of Cagliari. The most tender ode is written in Greek:

From your ashes, Pomptilla, violets and lilies flourish and may you bloom again in the petals of the rose, of the fragrant crocus, of the eternal amaranth, and of the beautiful flowers of the white panzy, like the narcissus and the sad amaranth, also the time that will, always will have your flower. In fact, when already the spirit of Philip was about to melt from his limbs, and he had his soul on his lips, Pomptilla, leaning on his pale groom, Pontilla the life of him with hers exchanged. And the Gods broke a union so happy, for the sake of her sweet husband died Pontilla; now Philip is living against his will, always longing to be able to confuse soon his soul with that of the bride who loved him so much The carmina in the Grotta della Vipera enshrine the beginning of the literary history of the island. From the late Roman period we have received the highly polemical writings of St. Lucifer from Cagliari, a staunch defender of Catholic orthodoxy against the Arian heresy. Other writings on theology have come to us from the Bishop Eusebius of Vercelli, born in Cagliari, and a contemporary of Lucifer.

== The Middle Ages ==
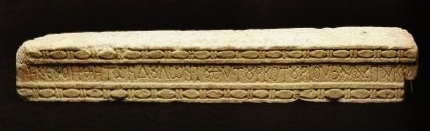
Medium-Hellenic inscription of the ninth century A.D., coming from southern Sardinia

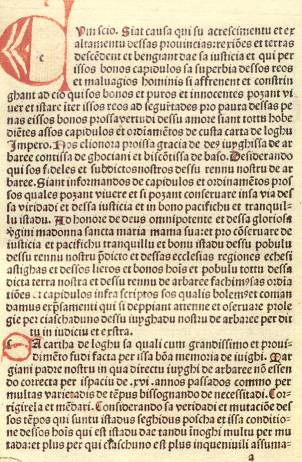
Carta de logu de Arbarei

Literary production was few throughout the Middle Ages: some hagiographic texts, in Latin, in prose and poetry, often extensively reworked in later centuries, have come down to us. Some of them have very ancient origins, perhaps dating back to the monastery and religious literature that was created in Cagliari around the figure of St. Fulgence of Ruspe at the time of his exile during the reign vandal Thrasamund. In this period were written in Cagliari some of the most precious and ancient codes of the time, like maybe the Codex Laudianus, containing one or perhaps the oldest one edition of the Acts of the Apostles, has come down and now preserved in the Bodleian Library at Oxford, and the Codex Basilianus, containing some of the works of St. Hilary of Poitiers, wrote in Cagliari, as a specified in a note in the manuscript and preserved in the Vatican Library. The Passions of the martyrs San Saturno, San Lussorio and San Gavino also come down as well as the hagiographic stories of Sant'Antioco and San Giorgio from Suelli.

Characteristic of medieval Sardinia, in the eleventh century, was the early use of the Sardinian language in the acts of the Sardinian kings, records of monasteries or notary and in the legislation. For the history of the island, particular importance had the promulgation of the Carta de Logu of Arborea, a legal code which condensed the old common law especially for the countryside, to integrate of Roman laws (Codex Justinianus) in force across Europe. The early use of vulgar Sardinian date back to the eleventh century: we can find it in the acts of donations of the "Judges" (kings) to various religious orders and in condaxis or condaghes that were administrative documents.

Among the most important texts are the statutes of the Commune of Sassari, written in Latin and logudorese Sardinian in 1316. The document is divided into three parts: the first concerns the public law, civil law, the second and the third criminal law. This code was gradually adopted by many municipalities on the island. Other municipalities had their own statutes, as Cagliari and Iglesias, whose short of Villa di Chiesa was prepared in Tuscany.

Also in the fourteenth century was promulgated by Mariano IV the Carta de Logu, which was the code of the laws of the State of the court of Arborea. The paper was subsequently updated and expanded by Eleanor, daughter of Mariano. This code of laws continues to be considered one of the most innovative and interesting of the XIII century.

There is no literature in Sardinia for most of the Middle Ages. In Judicial era there are several documents in Sardinian typically consisting of records and legal documents, that consists of condaghi and different cartas de logu. A small medieval text in the history of the Sardinian judge of Torres, the Libellus Judicum Turritanorum constitutes the first historiographic text. The first literary work in Sardinian, now at the end of the Middle Ages, from the second half of the fifteenth century, however, published about a century later. It is a poem inspired by the life of the holy martyrs turritani by the Archbishop of Sassari Antonio Canu. This work is the only one before the second half of the sixteenth century.

[edit]

== Habsburg Sardinia ==
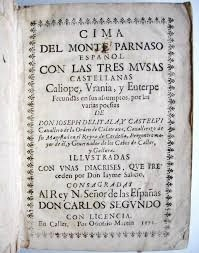
Cima del monte Parnaso español con las tres musas castellanas Caliope, Urania y Euterpe

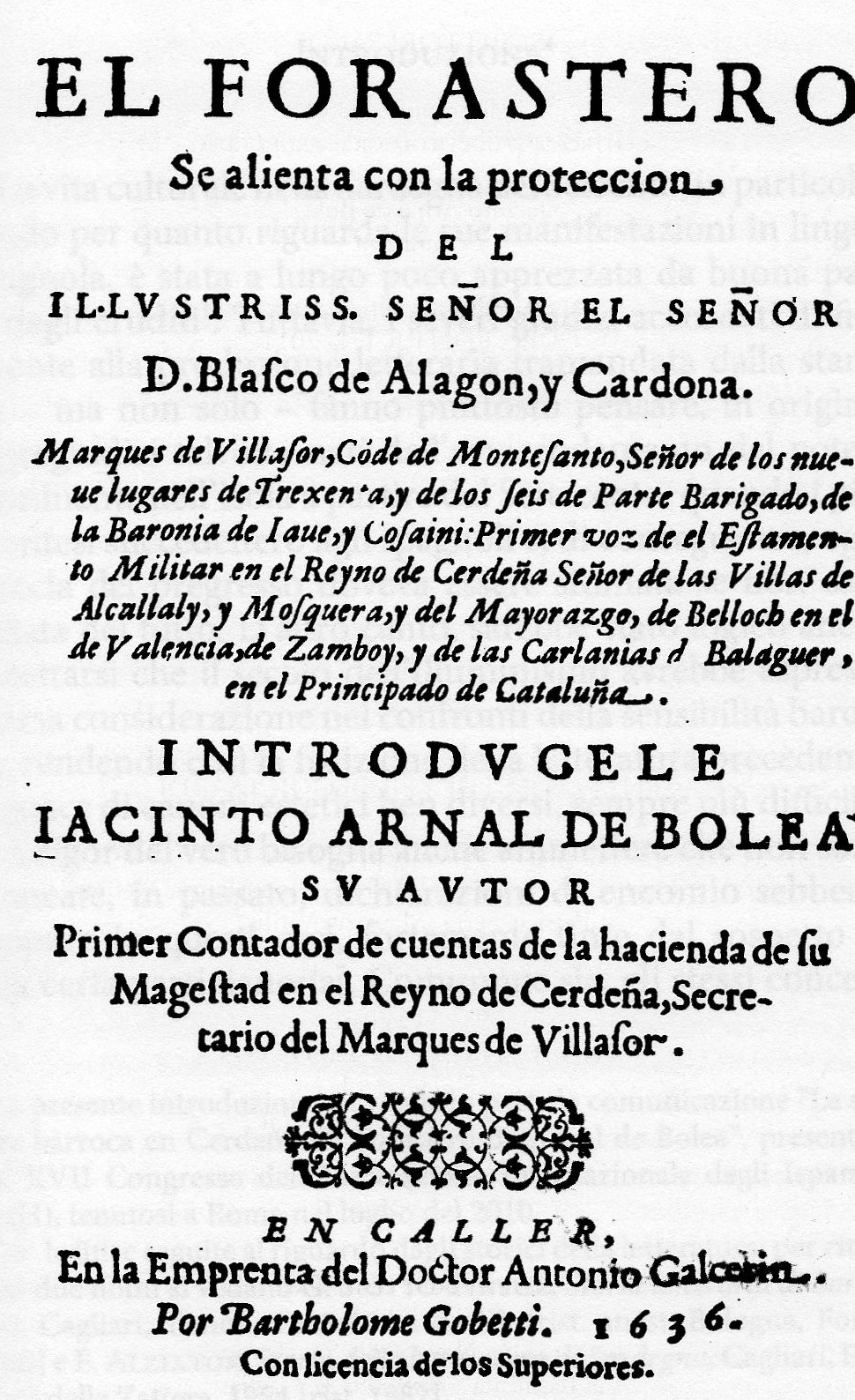
EL FORASTERO

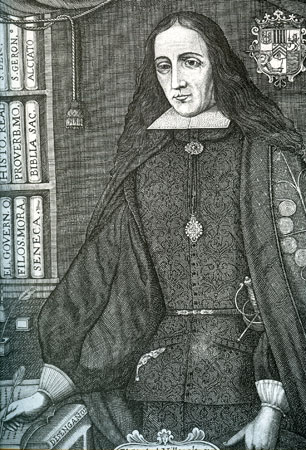
Giuseppe Zatrillas

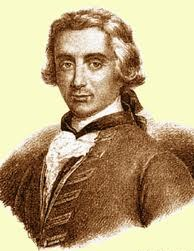
Vicente Bacallar y Sanna

The final fall of East Roman Empire to the Turks (and their spread in the Balkan-Greek peninsula) in 1453, the expulsion of the Arab-Berber Muslims from the Iberian Peninsula, the geographical discoveries, culminated with the discovery of the New World, and, finally, the focus in one man, Charles V, of a vast empire, carry Europe and with it Sardinia in the modern age. The Sardinian authors of the sixteenth century as Antonio Lo Frasso, Sigismund Arquer, Giovanni Francesco Fara, Pedro Delitala will be multilingual, multicultural. While Lo Frasso writes his poems in Spanish, Catalan and Sardinian, Delitala choose to write in Italian or Tuscan, and Jeronimo Araolla writes in three languages. But by that time, the penetration of Castilian as a literary language knows no barriers and becomes overwhelmingly in the seventeenth century, while the non-fiction of the period use Latin as in the rest of Europe.

In the seventeenth century there is a further integration with the Iberian world as demonstrated by the works of the Spanish speaking Sardinian poets Giuseppe Delitala y Castelvì and Jose Zatrillas, and historian Angelo Francesco de Vico, while those of Francesco Vidal.

== 18th and 19th centuries ==
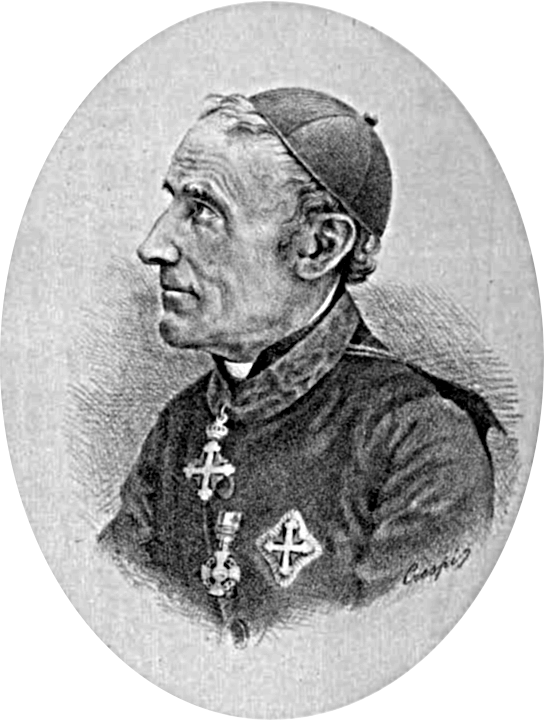
Giovanni Spano

In the eighteenth century, the outcome of the War of Spanish succession drew Sardinia away from the plurisecular Iberian orbit. The crown of the kingdom passed to the House of Savoy, and during the century the ideas of the Enlightenment spread, as well as an increasing of education and culture, owing to the public works and reform of Giovanni Battista Lorenzo Bogino, with the introduction of Italian as official language at the expense of Spanish and the native languages.

In the second half of the eighteenth century a production of "gender" oratorio (mostly only in manuscript) takes shape in Sardinian who has the highest representative on the priest Giovanni Battista Zonchello Espada from Sedilo. The sacred oratory, for quality and quantity of production (also given to the press), will impose, however, only in the following century by Angelo Maria De Martis, Salvatore Cossu, Frassu Salvatore, Antonio Soggiu (founder of a school of oratory in Oristano) and Salvatore Carboni. In the first half of the twentieth century prose sacred Sardinian prosegurà with many authors such Eugenuo Sanna from Milis, Pietro Maria Cossu from Escovedu, Aurelio Puddu from Barumini, Efisio Marras from Allai and the priest novelist and writer Pietro Casu from Berchidda.

In the 19th century modern science was introduced to Sardinia. Giovanni Spano undertook the first archaeological excavations, Giuseppe Manno wrote the first great general history of the island, Pasquale Tola published important documents of the past, Pietro Martini writes biographies of famous Sardinian, Alberto La Marmora runs through the island far and wide, studying in detail and writing a massive work in four parts entitled Voyage en Sardaigne, published in Paris. Production in Latin was so strong that even in 1837 the Piedmontese botanist Giuseppe Giacinto Moris, a professor at the University of Cagliari, published his Flora sardoa, the first systematic study of the Sardinian flora, entirely in Latin.

In the nineteenth century many travelers visit the city and island districts. Throughout the century, arriving in Sardinia Alphonse de Lamartine, Honoré de Balzac, Antonio Bresciani, Paolo Mantegazza and others. Between the 19th and the 20th centuries the birth of Sardinian Philology dates back, or the study on textual productions of the Romance languages historically spoken and written in Sardinia. The initiator of this philological and literary approach was Max Leopold Wagner and Giuliano Bonazzi for literary texts, as well as Enrico Besta and Arrigo Solmi were the initiators for official documents and historical legal texts. And in the twentieth century the contribution in the same vein of historical legal research was due to Alberto Boscolo and his school in the mid sixties.

Among the writers of Sardinian literature of that century was Giuseppe Botero, who was not from the island of Sardinia, but originary from the Italian region of Piedmont. Among other works, Botero was the author of the novel Ricciarda o i Nurra e i Cabras (1854) (Riccarda or the Nurra and the Cabras), which refers to the frequent theme of love between young people belonging to families that hate each other, which is very liked by Sardinian novelists.

== 20th century ==
Also in the early twentieth century, Enrico Costa tells the stories of some of the legendary figures of the island. But it was the work of Grazia Deledda to raise awareness of Sardinia in the world, especially after the writer was awarded the Nobel Prize for Literature in 1926.

An important contribution to literary culture came from Antonio Gramsci and Emilio Lussu. Important anthropologists have written about Sardinia, the most recent: Ernesto de Martino, Mario Alberto Cirese, Giulio Angioni, Michelangelo Pira, Clara Gallini.

After World War II emerged with figures such as Giuseppe Dessi, his novels including his Paese d'ombre (country of shadows). In more recent years the autobiographical novels of Gavino Ledda Padre padrone and Salvatore Satta Judgment Day had widely reported, in addition to works by Sergio Atzeni, Maria Giacobbe, Salvatore Mannuzzu, Giulio Angioni, Marcello Fois, Michela Murgia, Salvatore Niffoi, Bianca Pitzorno, Gianfranco Pintore and Flavio Soriga.

== Campidanese Sardinian language comic theater ==
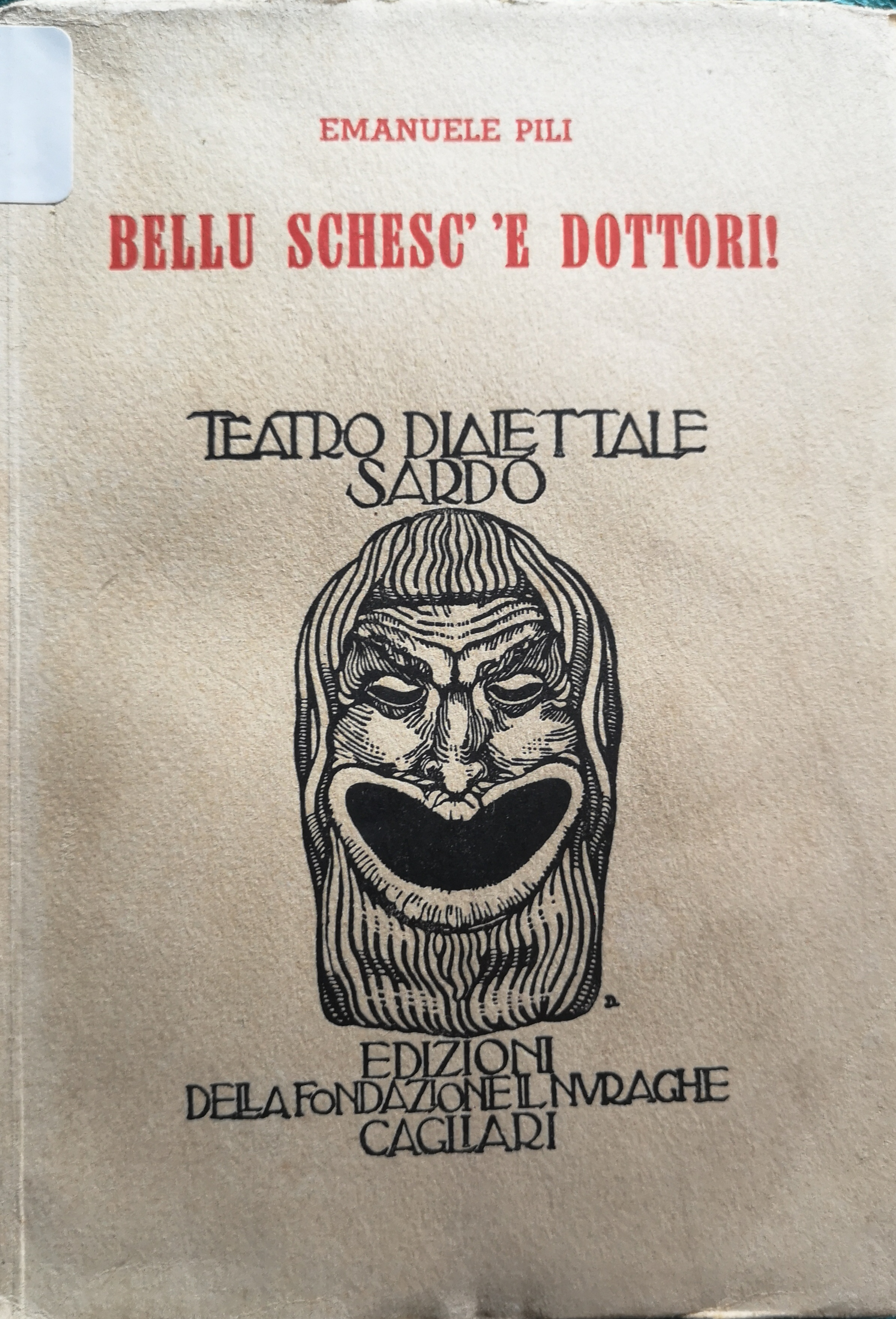
Campidanese Sardinian language

At the beginning of the twentieth century a locally successful line of authors of comic theater developed in the Campidanese Sardinian language. Based mostly on the funniness of the characters of the city of Cagliari at the time and of the Campidanese peasants and their difficulty in expressing themselves in Italian, it drew its roots which can already be glimpsed in the sixteenth-century works of Juan Francisco Carmona, from the accentuated difference between the city, provincial but inserted in the contemporary world and a good-natured and reserved rural environment. The trend, albeit with the exhaustion of the authors still has a large following of audiences in the theater and in comedy television broadcasts. The greatest authors were Emanuele Pilu, Efisio Vincenzo Nelis, Antonio Garau.

== List of Sardinian writers and poets ==
=== Roman era ===
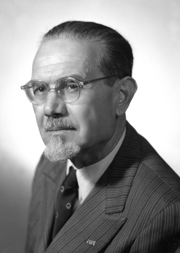
Emilio Lussu

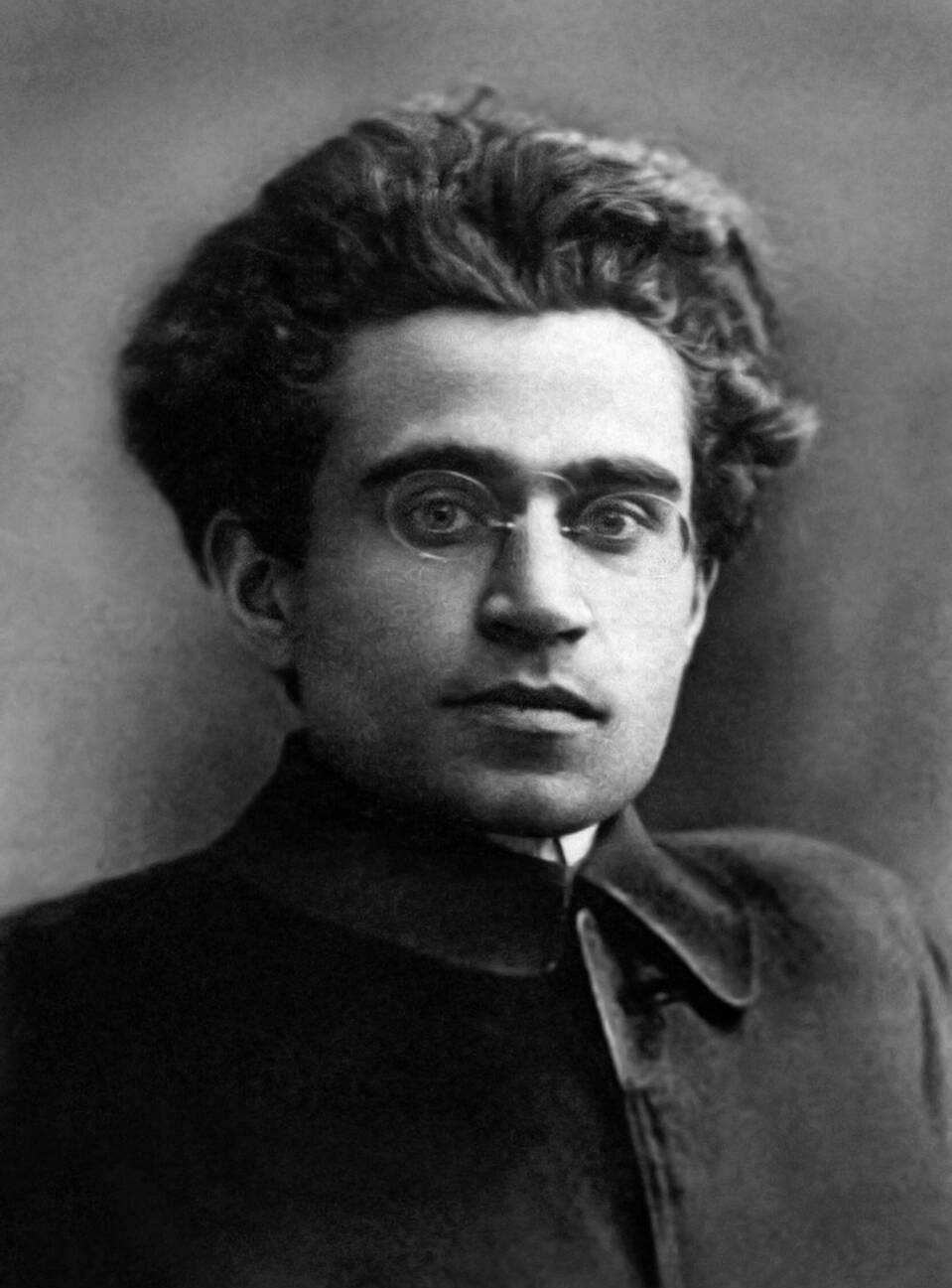
Antonio Gramsci

- Lucius Cassius Philippus wrote in Greek and Latin the Carmina of the Grotta della Vipera
- Saint Lucifer bishop of Cagliari wrote in Latin
- Eusebio Holy Bishop of Vercelli wrote in Latin.

=== Late middle ages ===
- Hagiography of Saint George of Suelli, 11th century, written in Latin.
- Constitution of the Republic of Sassari, written in Latin and Sardinian
- Liber iudicum turritanorum, written in Sardinian
- Antonio Cano, (Sassari, XV century) wrote in romance Sardinian.
- Carta de Logu, written in Sardinian.

=== Modern age ===
- Gerolamo Araolla (Sassari, circa 1542 – before 1615) wrote in Sardinian and Spanish
- Sigismondo Arquer (Cagliari, 1530 – Toledo, 1571) wrote in Latin and Spanish
- Giovanni Francesco Fara (1542 – 1591) wrote in Latin
- Antonio Lo Frasso (Alghero, about 1540 – about 1600), quoted by Miguel de Cervantes in Don Quixote, wrote in Spanish and Sardinian
- Joan Dexart, wrote in Latin
- Francesco Bellit wrote in Catalan
- Antonio Canales de Vega wrote in Spanish
- Francesco Aleo wrote in Spanish and Latin
- Joan Thomas Porcell wrote in Spanish
- Giorgio Aleo wrote in Spanish
- Dimas Serpi wrote in Latin and Spanish
- Antonio Maria da Esterzili (author of the first play in campidanese Sardinian) wrote in Sardinian
- Roderigo Hunno Baeza, author of "Caralis panegyricus", a poem in Latin, with which he praised the city of Cagliari, composed around 1516 and written in Latin
- Jacinto de Arnal Bolea (author of "El Forastero" the first novel set in Cagliari) wrote in Spanish
- Juan Francisco Carmona wrote in Spanish and in Sardinian, author of the Hymno a Càller (Hymn to Cagliari)
- Salvatore Vidal wrote in Latin and Spanish
- Jose Delitala Y Castelvì wrote in Spanish
- Joseph Zatrillas Vico wrote in Spanish
- Vincenzo Bacallar Y Sanna, the Marquis of San Felipe Francesco Angelo de Vico, (Sassari, 1580 – Madrid, 1648), author of Historia General de la Isla y Reyno de Cerdeña, wrote in Latin, Spanish, French.
- Antonio Maccioni
- Gavino Pes said Don Baignu (1724 – 1795) wrote in Sardo-Corsican

=== From the 19th century to the World War I ===
- Francesco Ignazio Mannu (Ozieri, 1758 – Cagliari, 1839) wrote on Su patriottu sardu a sos feudatarios
- Melchiorre Murenu (Macon, 1803 – 1854) wrote in Sardinian
- Paolo Mossa (Bonorva 1821 to 1892)
- Giovanni Spano (Ploaghe 1803, Cagliari 1878)
- Giovanni Maria Asara (Pattada, 1823 – 1907)
- Enrico Costa (Sassari, 1841 – 1909)
- Salvatore Farina (Sorso, 1846 – Milan, 1918)
- Pompeo Calvia (Sassari, 1857 – 1921)
- Gavino Contini (Siligo, 1865 – 1915)
- Sebastiano Satta (Nuoro, 1867 – 1914)
- Grazia Deledda (Nuoro, 1871 – Rome, 1936), Nobel Prize for Literature in 1926

=== Post World War I times and current ===
- Ottone Baccaredda (Cagliari,1849–Cagliari,1921), mayor of Cagliari
- Gaetano Canelles (Cagliari 1876–1942)
- Peppino Mereu (Tonara, 1872 – 1901)
- Pietro Casu (Berchidda, 1878 - 1954), priest, author, and philologist
- Antioco Casula said Montanaru (Desulo, 1878 – 1957)
- Francesco Cucca (Nuoro, 1882 – Naples, 1947)
- Emilio Lussu (Armungia, 1890 – Rome, 1975
- Emanuele Pili (Villaputzu 1880 -?) Campidanese Sardinian language theater author
- Efisio Vincenzo Melis (Guamaggiore 1889–1921) Campidanese Sardinian language theater author
- Antonio Gramsci (Ales,1891 – Rome, 1937)
- Barore Sassu (Banari, 1891 – 1976)
- Salvatore Cambosu (Orotelli, 1895 – Nuoro, 1962)
- Gonario Pinna (Nuoro, 1898 – 1991)
- Salvatore Satta (Nuoro, 1902 – Rome, 1975)
- Remundu Piras (Villanova Monteleone, 1905 – 1978)
- Antonio Garau (1907-1988) Campidanese Sardinian language theater author
- Giuseppe Dessi (Cagliari, 1909 – Milan, 1977)
- Francesco Masala (Nughedu St. Nicholas, 1916 – Cagliari, 2007)
- Giuseppe Fiori (Silanus, 1923 – Rome, 2003)
- Michelangelo said Mialinu Pira (Bitti, 1928 – Marina di Capitana, 1980)
- Giuseppe Mercurio (Orosei, 1919 – 1994)
- Maria Giacobbe (Nuoro, 1928)
- Lina Unali (Rome, 1936)
- Gavino Ledda (Siligo, 1938)
- Gianfranco Pintore (Irgoli 1939)
- Bianca Pitzorno (Sassari, 1942)
- Salvatore Mannuzzu (Pitigliano,1930)
- Nanni Falconi (Pattada,1950)
- Sergio Atzeni (Capoterra, 1952 – Carloforte, 1995)

=== Sardinian Literary Spring ===
- Giulio Angioni (Guasila 1939 – 2017)
- Salvatore Niffoi (Orani, 1950)
- Alberto Capitta (Sassari 1954))
- Marcello Fois (Nuoro 1960)
- Michela Murgia (Cabras 1972 – Rome 2023)
- Flavio Soriga (Uta, 1975)
- Giorgio Todde
- Milena Agus
- Francesco Abate (Cagliari 1964)

== See also ==
- Sardinia
- Sardinian Literary Spring
- List of Sardinians
- Sardinian language, Gallurese, Sassarese, Algherese, Tabarchino

== Bibliography ==
- Giovanni Lupinu, Latino epigrafico della Sardegna, Ilisso, Nuoro, 2000.
- Paolo Maninchedda, Medioevo Latino e volgare in Sardegna, CUEC/SFT, Cagliari, 2007.
- Max Leopold Wagner, La lingua sarda. Storia, spirito e forma, Bern, 1950 [ora a cura di G. Paulis, Nuoro, 1997].
- Francesco Alziator, Storia della letteratura di Sardegna, Cagliari, 1954.
- Giuseppe Dessì – Nicola Tanda, Narratori di Sardegna, Milano, Mursia, 1973.
- Nicola Tanda, Letteratura e lingue in Sardegna, Cagliari, Edes, 1984.
- Giovanni Pirodda, La Sardegna, Brescia, Editrice La scuola, 1992.
- Andrea Deplano, Rimas. Suoni versi strutture della poesia tradizionale sarda, Cagliari, 1997.
- Nicola Tanda – Dino Manca, Il sistema letterario sardo, in Introduzione alla letteratura, Cagliari, Centro di Studi Filologici Sardi / CUEC, 2005, pp. 279–320.
- Giuseppe Marci, In presenza di tutte le lingue del mondo. Letteratura sarda, Cagliari, Centro di studi Filologici Sardi / Cuec, 2005.
- Dino Manca, Il tempo e la memoria, Roma, Aracne, 2006
- Giancarlo Porcu, Régula castigliana. Poesia sarda e metrica spagnola dal '500 al '700, Nuoro, 2008.
- Gianni Atzori – Gigi Sanna, Sardegna. Lingua Comunicazione Letteratura, Castello Cagliari, 1995-1998 (2 voll.).
- Gigi Sanna, Pulpito politica e letteratura, Predica e predicatori in lingua sarda, S'Alvure 2002.
- Gigi Sanna (a cura di), " Efisio Marras, Preigas", Ed. Nuove Grafiche Puddu 2010
- Salvatore Tola, La letteratura in lingua sarda. Testi, autori, vicende, CUEC Cagliari 2006.
- Dino Manca, La comunicazione linguistica e letteraria dei Sardi: dal Medioevo alla "fusione perfetta", in "Bollettino di Studi Sardi", IV, 4 (2011), Centro di Studi Filologici Sardi, Cagliari, Cuec, 2011, pp. 49–75.
- Giulio Angioni, Cartas de logu: scrittori sardi allo specchio, Cagliari, CUEC, 2007.
- Francesco Casula. Letteratura e civiltà della Sardegna, vol.I, Grafica del Parteolla, 2011.
- Bibliografia sarda / Raffaele Ciasca. – Roma : Collezione meridionale. – v.; 22 cm. Sotto gli auspici della R. Università degli studi di Cagliari.
- Arce Joaquin, España en Cerdeña : aportacion cultural y testimonios de su influjo, Madrid : Consejo superior de investigaciones cientificas, Instituto Jeronimo Zurita, 1960.
