= Alberto Capitta =

Italian writer

Alberto Capitta (born 1954 in Sassari) is an Italian writer.

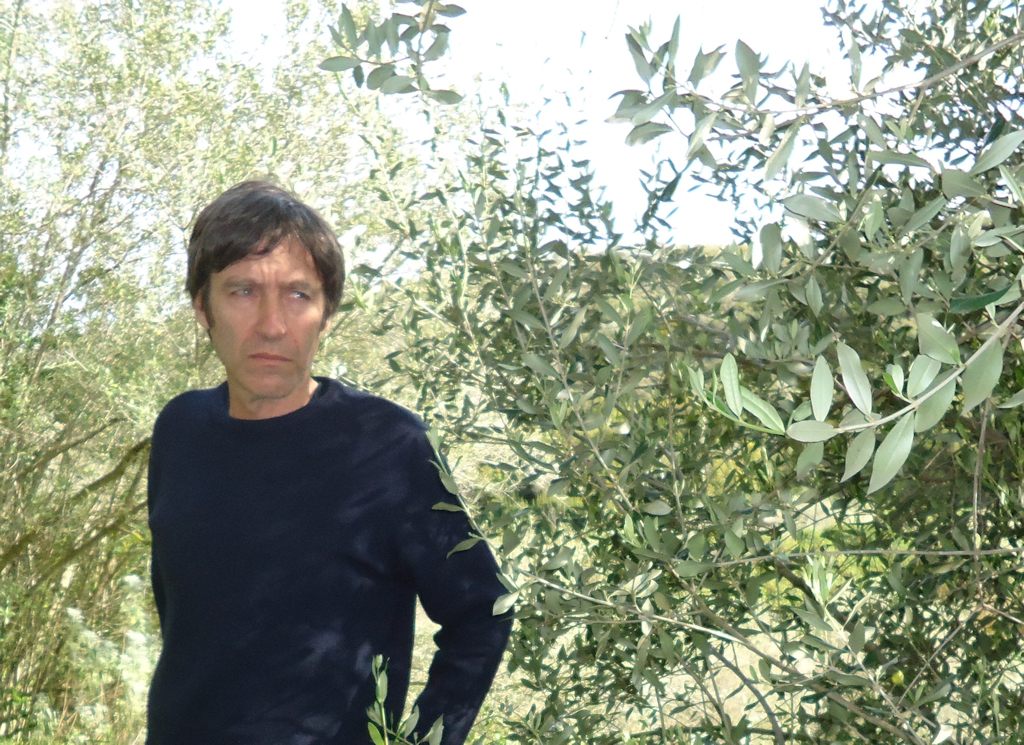
Alberto Capitta

== Biography ==
Alberto Capitta currently lives and works in Sassari as an actor and playwright. His novel Creaturine (Il Maestrale 2004, Frassinelli 2005) was finalist for the Strega Prize, one of Italy's most influential and controversial literary awards.

In 2006 he received the prize Lo Straniero, "as one of the most interesting writers of an extraordinary Sardinian flowering", namely of the Sardinian Literary Spring, started in the late 1980s by a group of young writers including Marcello Fois and others (and eventually even some not so young like Giulio Angioni), Salvatore Mannuzzu and Sergio Atzeni, after the works of individual figures such as Grazia Deledda, Emilio Lussu, Giuseppe Dessì, Gavino Ledda, Salvatore Satta.

== Works ==
- Il cielo nevica, Guaraldi 1999; Il Maestrale 2007 (ISBN 978-88-89801-04-8)
- Creaturine, Il Maestrale 2004 (ISBN 978-88-86109-80-2); Il Maestrale / Frassinelli 2005 (ISBN 978-88-76848-71-1)
- Il giardino non-esiste, Il Maestrale 2008 (ISBN 978-88-89801-48-2)
- Alberi erranti e naufraghi, Il Maestrale 2013 (ISBN 978-88-6429-123-9)
- L'ultima trasfigurazione di Ferdinand, Il Maestrale 2016 (ISBN 978-88-6429-166-6)

== Bibliography ==
- Goffredo Fofi, Sardegna, che Nouvelle vague!, Panorama, November 2003.
