= Flavio Soriga =

Italian writer (born 1975)

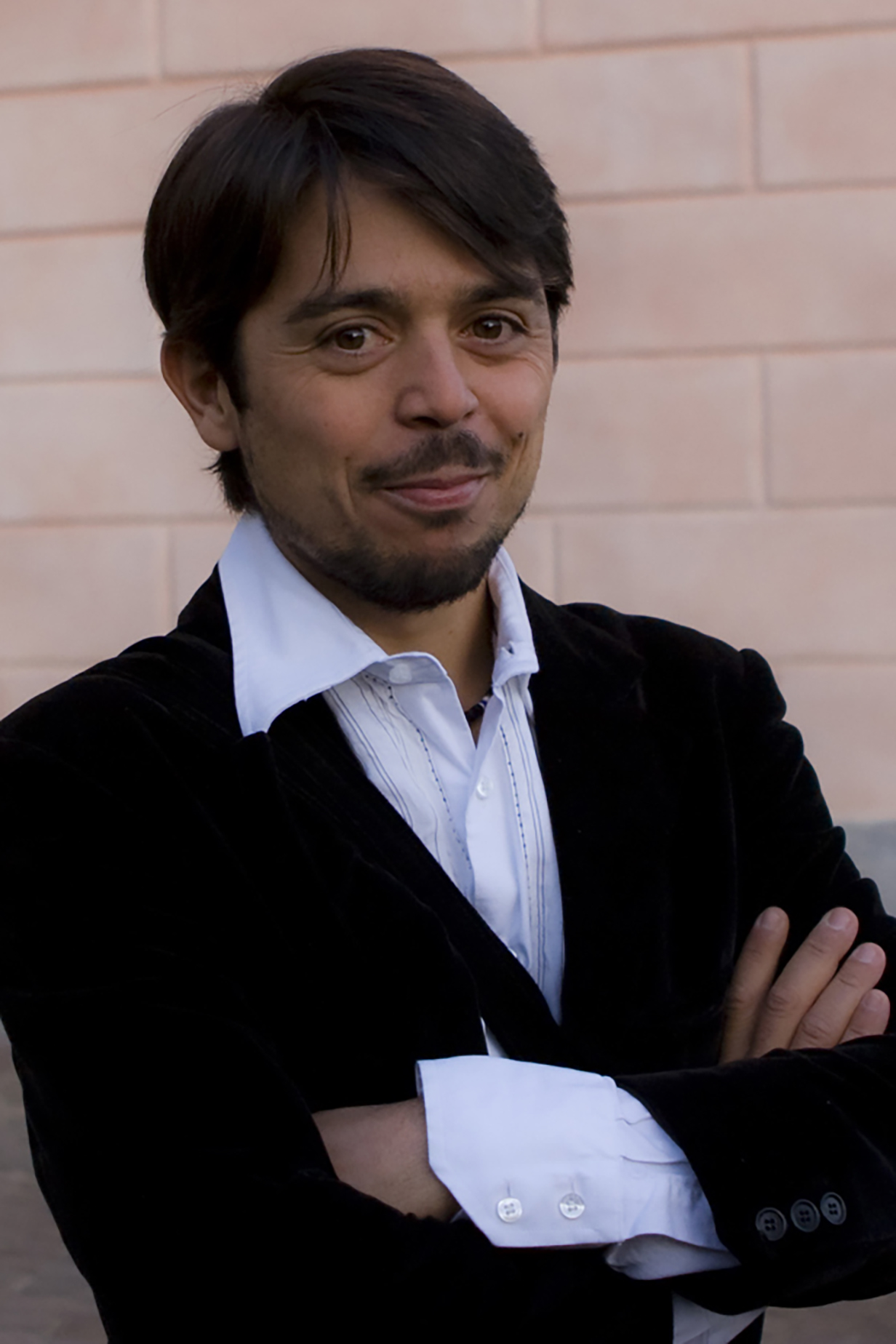
Flavio Soriga

Flavio Soriga (born 1975 in Uta, Sardinia) is an Italian writer.

== Biography ==
Flavio Soriga is the youngest representative of the Sardinian literary nouvelle vague, aka Sardinian Literary Spring, namely the Sardinian narrative of today in the European arena, started by Giulio Angioni, Salvatore Mannuzzu and Sergio Atzeni, after the works of prominent figures such as Grazia Deledda, Emilio Lussu, Giuseppe Dessì, Gavino Ledda, Salvatore Satta.

Winner in the 2000 of the Italo Calvino Prize (for unpublished works) with the collection of short stories Diavoli di Nuraiò, Flavio Soriga won in 2003, with the detective novel Neropioggia, the Grazia Deledda Prize. In 2007 he was granted by the University of Vienna the donation of the Foundation Abraham Woursell (HALMA network) for young writers:. In 2008, with the novel Sardinia Blues he won the Mondello Prize, and in 2009 the Piero Chiara Prize with the collection of short stories L'amore a Londra e in altri luoghi.

He currently lives in Rome, where he works as a free lance for Italian newspapers and televisions.

Flavio Soriga is affected by Thalassemia, in his novel Sardinia Blues speaks of his disease.

== Works ==
- Diavoli di Nuraiò (Il Maestrale, 2000)
- Neropioggia (Garzanti, 2002)
- Sardinia Blues (Bompiani, 2008)
- L'amore a Londra e in altri luoghi (Bompiani, 2009)
- Il cuore dei briganti (Bompiani, 2010)
- Nuraghe Beach (Laterza, 2011)
- Metropolis (Bompiani, 2013)
