= Salvatore Niffoi =

Italian writer (born 1950)

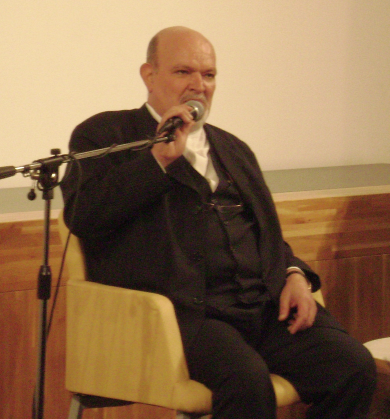
Salvatore Niffoi, conference room of Biblioteca Delfini, Modena in 2008

Salvatore Niffoi (born 1950, in Orani, Sardinia) is an Italian writer.

Niffoi is a representative of the so-called Sardinian Literary Nouvelle Vague, or Sardinian Literary Spring, i.e., the Sardinian narrative of today, which was initiated by Giulio Angioni, Salvatore Mannuzzu and Sergio Atzeni, following the work of individual prominent figures such as Grazia Deledda, Emilio Lussu, Giuseppe Dessì, Gavino Ledda, Salvatore Satta. His prose is mostly a mixture of the Italian and Sardinian languages.

Niffoi lives in Orani, a small village of Barbagia, in the province of Nuoro, where he was a middle-school teacher until 2006. He started his career as a novelist in 1997, with his first work, Collodoro. In 2006, with the novel La vedova scalza he won the Campiello Prize.

== Works ==
- Collodoro, Solinas, 1997
- Il viaggio degli inganni, Il Maestrale, 1999
- Il postino di Piracherfa, Il Maestrale, 2000
- Cristolu, Il Maestrale, 2001
- La sesta ora, Il Maestrale, 2003
- La leggenda di Redenta Tiria, Adelphi, 2005
- La vedova scalza, Adelphi, 2006
- Ritorno a Baraule, Adelphi, 2007
- L'ultimo inverno, Il Maestrale, 2007
- Collodoro, Adelphi, 2008
- Il pane di Abele, Adelphi, 2009
- Paraìnas – Detti e parole di Barbagia, Adelphi, 2009
- Il bastone dei miracoli, Adelphi, 2010
- Il lago dei sogni, Adelphi, 2011
- I malfatati: romanzi 1999–2007, Il Maestrale, 2011
- Pantumas, Feltrinelli, 2012
- Il venditore di metafore, Giunti Editore, 2017

== Bibliography ==
- Goffredo Fofi, Sardegna, che Nouvelle vague!, Panorama, November 2003 .
- A. M. Amendola, L'isola che sorprende. La narrativa sarda in italiano (1974–2006), Cagliari, CUEC 2008.
- Birgit Wagner, Sardinien, Insel im Dialog. Texte, Diskurse, Filme, Tübingen, Francke Verlag, 2008.

== See also ==
- List of Italian writers
- List of novelists
- List of people from Sardinia
