= Sard (disambiguation) =

Sard is a dark reddish-brown variety of the mineral chalcedony, similar to carnelian.

Sard may also refer to:

- Sard's lemma, a result in mathematical analysis, named after mathematician Arthur Sard
- Anything from, or related to the Mediterranean island of Sardinia
  - Sardinians, a people hailing from the aforementioned island
  - Sardinian, a language spoken on Sardinia
  - Sardinian literature
  - Sardinian music
  - Sardinian history
  - Sardinian (sheep)
- Sardis, the capital city of the ancient kingdom of Lydia
- Sard, Khuzestan, a village in Khuzestan Province, Iran
- Sard, Lorestan, a village in Lorestan Province, Iran
- Sard, a planet in the Gradius video game series

Şard may refer to:

- Şard (Hungarian: Sard), a village in Ighiu Commune, Alba County, Romania
- Șoarș, a commune in Braşov County, Romania
- Şardu, a village in Cluj County, Romania
- Şapartoc, a village in Mureș County, Romania
- Şardu Nirajului, a village in Mureș County, Romania
- Şoard, a village in Mureș County, Romania
- Saravale, a commune in Timiș County, Romania
- Şaroş pe Târnave, in Sibiu County, Romania
- Noroieni, a village in Satu Mare County, Romania
- Șar River (Cormoș), an affluent of the Cormoş River, Romania
- Șar River (Mureș), an affluent of the Mureş River, Romania
- Sáros county, a former division of the Kingdom of Hungary, now in Slovakia

SARD may refer to:

- SARD Corporation, a Japanese racing team, and aftermarket automotive-component manufacturer
- Sudden acquired retinal degeneration, a disease in dogs causing sudden blindness
- Selective androgen receptor degrader
- Specific apple replant disease

== See also ==
- Sardinian (disambiguation)
