= Sardinian Literary Spring =

Sardinian Literary Spring is a definition of the whole body of the literature produced in Sardinia from around the 1980s onwards.

== History ==
=== About the denomination ===
Sardinian Literary Spring, also known as Sardinian Literary Nouvelle Vague, is a denomination normally used to describe the literary works written by Sardinians from around the 1980s. It is described as being formed of novels and other written texts (and sometimes also of cinema, theatre and other works of art), which often share stylistic and thematic constants. They form a kind of fiction with features that derive mainly, but not only, from the Sardinian, Italian, and European context and history.

The Sardinian Literary Spring is considered to be one of the most remarkable regional literatures in Italian, but sometimes also written in one of the island's minority languages (the most prominent of which being the Sardinian language, in addition to the other Romance varieties spoken in Sardinia, namely Corsican, Catalan, and Genoese).

The definition of 'spring' or 'nouvelle vague' or plainly 'new Sardinian literature' is due to the new quality, quantity, and international success of many works published by these Sardinian authors, translated in many world languages.

=== Initiators, predecessors and followers ===
The Sardinian Literary Spring was started, according to a mostly shared canonical opinion, by a trio formed of Giulio Angioni, Sergio Atzeni and Salvatore Mannuzzu, and then continued by authors such as Salvatore Niffoi, Alberto Capitta, Giorgio Todde, Michela Murgia, Flavio Soriga, Milena Agus, Francesco Abate, and many others.

The Sardinian Literary Spring is considered to be also the contemporary result, in the European arena, of the works of Sardinian individual prominent figures such as Grazia Deledda, Nobel Prize winner for literature in 1926, Emilio Lussu, Giuseppe Dessì, Gavino Ledda, Salvatore Satta, and others.

Sergio Atzeni (1952 - 1995) worked for some of the most important Sardinian newspapers. Member of the Italian Communist Party, but later disillusioned with politics, he left Sardinia and travelled across Europe. All of Atzeni's works are set in Sardinia. He used a very original language that fused elegant literary Italian and the "patter" used by the working-class in Cagliari and Sardinia. In some of his novels (e.g. Il quinto passo è l'addio and Bellas mariposas) he also used techniques akin to the magic realism style of many Southern American authors, and he has been followed by other Sardinian authors, such as Alberto Capitta, Giorgio Todde, and Salvatore Niffoi, who in 2006, with the novel La vedova scalza (The barefoot widow), won the popular Premio Campiello.

Giulio Angioni (born 1939) is a leading Italian anthropologist. He is also well known as the author of about twenty books of fiction and poetry. Angioni writes mostly in Italian, but also in Sardinian. He has inaugurated a linguistic style which switches from the standard Italian to the regional (Sardinian) Italian and other linguistic varieties, in an original mixture of his own, but also followed by other Sardinian authors. Angioni's best novels are considered to be Le fiamme di Toledo (Flames of Toledo), Assandira, La pelle intera, Doppio cielo (Double sky), L'oro di Fraus. (The gold of Fraus).

Salvatore Mannuzzu’s (born 1930) most successful novel is Procedura (1988, Einaudi), winner of Italy's Premio Viareggio in 1989. In 2000 the director Antonello Grimaldi has made the film Un delitto impossibile from this novel, which is also considered (with the coeval L'oro di Fraus by Giulio Angioni) the origin of a genre of Sardinian detective stories (called giallo sardo). with authors such as Marcello Fois and Giorgio Todde, who gave birth to the Literary Festival of Gavoi, L'isola delle storie, with Giulio Angioni, Flavio Soriga, and other authors.

== Bibliography ==
- A. M. Amendola, L'isola che sorprende. La narrativa sarda in italiano (1974-2006), Cagliari, CUEC 200, 160-179.
- Giulio Angioni, Cartas de logu: scrittori sardi allo specchio, Cagliari, CUEC, 2007.
- M. Broccia, The Sardinian Literary Spring: An Overview. A New Perspective on Italian Literature, in "Nordicum Mediterraneum", Vol. 9, no. 1 (2014)
- Carlo Dionisotti, Geografia e storia della letteratura italiana, Torino, Einaudi, 1999.
- E. Hall, Greek tragedy and the politics of subjectivity in recent fiction, "Classical Receptions Journal", 1 (1), 23-42, Oxford University Press, 2009.
- H. Klüver, Gebrauchsanweisungen für Sardinien, München, Piper Verlag, 2012.
- C. Lavinio, Narrare un'isola. Lingua e stile di scrittori sardi, Roma, Bulzoni, 1991.
- F. Manai, Cosa succede a Fraus? Sardegna e mondo nel racconto di Giulio Angioni, Cagliari, CUEC, 2006.
- M. Marras, Ecrivains insulaires et auto-représentation, "Europaea", VI, 1-2 (2000), 17-77.
- A. Ottavi, Les romanciers italiens contemporains, Paris, Hachette, 1992, 142-145.
- S. Paulis, La costruzione dell'identità. Per un'analisi antropologica della narrativa in Sardegna fra '800 e '900, Sassari, EdeS, 2006.
- L. Schröder, Sardinienbilder. Kontinuitäten und Innovationen in der sardischen Literatur und Publizistik der Nachkriegszeit, Bern, Peter Lang, 2000.
- George Steiner, One thousand years of solitude: on Salvatore Satta, in G. Steiner, At the New Yorker, New York, New Directions Pub. Corp., 2009, ISBN 9780811217040
- F. Toso, La Sardegna che non parla sardo, Cagliari, CUEC, University Press, 2012.
- S. Tola, La letteratura in lingua sarda. Testi, autori, vicende, Cagliari, CUEC, 2006.
- B. Wagner, Sardinien, Insel im Dialog. Texte, Diskurse, Filme, Tübingen, Francke Verlag 2008.

== See also ==
- Sardinia
- Italian literature
- New Italian Epic
- Giulio Angioni
- Sergio Atzeni
- Salvatore Mannuzzu
- Flavio Soriga
- Salvatore Niffoi
- Sardinian language
