= Anthropopoiesis =

In anthropology, anthropopoiesis is the self-building process of social man and of a whole culture, particularly referred to what concerns modifications of socialized body. The concept found applications mainly in French and Italian contemporary literatures.

In accordance with theoretic background which supports the idea, man is an unfinished being or better his behaviour is not strongly prefixed by genetic heritage. Human beings become fully finished only by means of culture acquisition.

Anthropopoiesis is both anthropogenesis (man “reborn” as social creature) and manufacturing of ”mankind patterns and fictions”. Therefore, social and cultural practices build up the man by means of ritual and institutional constraints.

An example could be circumcision, a practice widely existing in many rites of passage amongst Islamic and Jewish believers and also amongst traditional cultures and communities. Besides, Christians ascribe a clear meaning to the sacred garment and to the tonsure; they are convinced that some sacramental rites mark indelible dispositions. All that affects the body and through this one the perception of one's own identity and social status.

== Bibliography ==
- Francis Affergan, Silvana Borutti, Claude Calame, Ugo Fabietti, Mondher Kilani, Francesco Remotti, et al. Figure dell'umano. Le rappresentazioni dell'antropologia, Roma: Meltemi, 2005.
- Giulio Angioni, Fare, dire, sentire: l'identico e il diverso nelle culture, Nuoro: Il Maestrale, 2011.
- Tatiana Cossu, L'arca del tiranno: umano, disumano e sovrumano nella Grecia arcaica, Cagliari: CUEC, 2009.
- Clifford Geertz, The transition to Humanity, in S. Tax (ed.), Horizons of Anthropology, London: Allen and Unwin 1965
- Francesco Remotti, Contro l'identità, Roma: Laterza, 1999
- Francesco Remotti, a cura di. Forme di umanità, Milano: Bruno Mondadori, 2002.
