= Assandira =

2004 novel by Giulio Angioni

- Author: Giulio Angioni
- Original title: Assandira
- Language: Italian
- Genre: Novel
- Publisher: Sellerio
- Publication date: 2004
- Publication place: Italy
- Media type: Print
- Pages: 243
- ISBN: 88-389-1991-7

Assandira is a novel by Giulio Angioni, published in 2004 by Sellerio.

== Summary ==
The old Sardinian shepherd Costantino Saru has been persuaded by his son and his Danish daughter in law to establish a hotel restaurant (called Assandira) in his abandoned barn. The characteristic of the company should be to offer European customers, especially from the north, an experience of life in the traditional pastoral world of Sardinia, where the old shepherd Costantino should be a kind of guarantor of authenticity. The company thrives and even Costantino feels at ease playing the part of the ancient Mediterranean shepherd. But one day a fire destroys Assandira, kills his son and causes abortion of her daughter in law. Costantino feels responsible and confesses to the investigator. The reason for his self-attribution of responsibility is not clear to the judge, who does not believe in such a self-incrimination, since his sharing the very idea of reliving the past in order to entertain the tourists.

== Editions ==
- 2004, ISBN 88-389-1991-7
- 2012 eBook, ISBN 9788838929946

== See also ==
- Sardinian Literary Spring
- Giulio Angioni
- Sa Laurera

== Sources ==
- E. Hall, Greek tragedy and the politics of subjectivity in recent fiction, "Classical Receptions Journal", 1 (1), 23–42, Oxford University Press, 2009.
- G. Pias, La casa della palma e Assandira: due "gialli" sulla memoria e l'identità, in Sabina Gola e Laura Rorato (cura), La forma del passato. Questioni di identità in opere letterarie e cinematografiche italiane a partire dagli ultimi anni Ottanta, Bruxelles, Bern, Berlin, Frankfurt am Main, New York, Oxford, Wien, Peter Lang, 2007, 261–274. ISBN 978-90-5201-318-3.
- H. Klüver, Gebrauchsanweisungen für Sardinien, München, Piper Verlag, 2012, 194–212.
- F. Manai, Cosa succede a Fraus? Sardegna e mondo nel racconto di Giulio Angioni, Cagliari, CUEC, 2006.
- B. Wagner, Sardinien, Insel im Dialog. Texte, Diskurse, Filme, Tübingen, Francke Verlag, 2008.
