= Nicola Tanda =

Italian philologist and literary critic (1928–2016)

Nicola Tanda (Sorso, 22 December 1928 – London, 4 June 2016) was an Italian philologist and literary critic. He studied under Ungaretti and Sapegno at Rome. He was for over thirty years professor at the University of Sassari, first specialising in Italian literature, and then later in Sardinian philology and Sardinian literature. He was a leading advocate for minority languages and their literary expression in the island of Sardinia, including the Sardinian language and Algherese Catalan. As such he was an honorary member of ANPOSDI. He wrote the new Philology of Italians based on the European Charter for Regional or Minority Languages. He was founder and president of the Sardinian PEN Club. He was president of the jury of the Premio Ozieri literary prize founded in 1956 to promote new works composed in Sardinian tongues. He founded in 2003 the Centre for Study of Sardinian Philology. As an editor/director he has guided the publication of over 100 volumes written in Sardinian languages.

He was an expert of the literary theory of 19th-century Italian authors as well as an authoritative voice on many modern and contemporary Italian writers including Pratolini, Montale, Gramsci, Dessì, Deledda, Pirandello, Pandolfo Collenuccio, Monti, Sebastiano Satta, Salvatore Farina, Antonino Mura Ena, and Salvatore Satta. In 1965 he co-edited with Dessì Narratori di Sardegna the first compilation of Sardinian writers.

He was a member of the International Association for the Study of Italian Language and Literature. He was an external associate of the International Centre For Multilingualism.

== Bibliography ==
- with G. Dessì, Narratori di Sardegna, Milan, Mursia, 1965
- with Joyce Lussu, Fronti e frontiere, Milan, Mursia, 1969
- Realta' e memoria nella narrativa contemporanea, Rome, Bulzoni, 1970
- Contemporanei: proposte di lettura, Turin, Loescher, 1972
- Classicismo e illuminismo nell'opera del Monti, Sassari, Dessì, 1974
- Pandolfo Collenuccio: il dramma della saviezza, Rome, Bulzoni, 1988
- Letteratura e lingue in Sardegna, Sassari, EDES, 1991
- Dal mito dell'isola all'isola del mito: Deledda e dintorni, Rome, Bulzoni, 1992
- with G.Dessì, Eleonora d'Arborea: racconto drammatico in quattro atti, Sassari, EDES, 1995
- Un' odissea de rimas nobas: verso la letteratura degli italiani, Cagliari, CUEC, 2003
- Quale Sardegna?: pagine di vita letteraria e civile, Sassari, Delfino, 2007
- Hispanic Intertextuality in Contemporary Sardinian Poetry in AnnalSS 6, 2009. Lost in Translation. Testi e culture allo specchio, Text in English in pdf
