= Remotti =

Remotti is an Italian surname. Notable people with the surname include:

- Francesco Remotti (born 1943), Italian anthropologist
- Remo Remotti (1924–2015), Italian actor, playwright, artist and poet
