= Lampades =

Torch-bearing nymphs of the goddess Hecate

In Greek mythology, the Lampads or Lampades (Ancient Greek: Λαμπάδες, from Ancient Greek: λαμπάς, romanized: lampás, lit. 'torch') are torch-bearing nymphs who follow the goddess Hecate.

== Mythology ==
According to a scholium on Homer's Iliad, the Lampades are among the types of nymphs mentioned by the lyric poet Alcman (fl. seventh century BC); the scholiast describes them as the nymphs "who carry torches and lights with Hecate", a description which Timothy Gantz claims was probably a creation of the scholiast, rather than of Alcman or another writer. According to Claude Calame, the scholium's connection of these nymphs with Hecate is likely related to the common association of the goddess with torches.

In Greek hexameters from Selinus dating to the fourth century BC, there is mention of "goddesses, bright with torches", which Sarah Iles Johnston interprets as referring to the Lampades, pointing to their attestation as torch-carrying goddesses, and their association with Hecate, who is mentioned immediately after these figures in the text.
