= Antonio Pigliaru =

Sardinian jurist and philosopher

Antonio Pigliaru (17 August 1922 in Orune – 27 March 1969 in Sassari) was a Sardinian jurist and philosopher. He was the most important Sardinian intellectual of the second half of the twentieth century, and one of the most vivid contemporary Italian thinkers. He engaged with manifold themes, but he devoted special attention to the interpretation of the socio-economic problems of interior areas of Sardinia, which he discussed according to his own ethical and political views.

== Life ==
Pigliaru was born in Orune, in Nuoro province, the youngest of five children. His parents, Pietro and Maria Murgia, were schoolteachers. They belonged to different social classes but shared the same education and job. Pietro came from a family of peasants, which at the time were a marginal group in the town, where sheep-breeding prevailed. Despite the family's scarce resources, after elementary school he continued studying. Maria, whose mother was also a schoolteacher, came from Sassari, a rather different context from Orune, where she moved after her degree to work as a teacher. Pietro and Maria got married in 1909. Antonio, whose father had died in the meantime, left his town after school to move to Sassari with his maternal grandparents, to complete his classical studies training. He always maintained strong ties with his town of origin. In 1940 he joined the GUF (University Fascist Group), where he first experienced intellectual engagement, contributing to the Group's journal, writing mostly on theatre. Like many youths of his generation, he believed the 'fascist revolution' could fulfil some expectations, but he always rejected the "aberrations" that the regime was exhibiting. He attended the university in Cagliari from 1941, studying in the Faculty of Literature and Philosophy. In March 1944 he was arrested together with other people, accused of serious offences such as espionage, civil war and political conspiracy. He was sentenced to 7 years of imprisonment by the Military Tribunal of Oristano, and served 17 months. While in jail he contracted the illness that was to cause his premature death. He was released in May 1946 following the Togliatti Amnesty. He then resumed his graduate studies, passing all exams in a few months, earning a degree with a thesis on existentialism in Giacomo Leopardi. In April 1949 he became voluntary assistant to the chair of Legal Philosophy at the University of Sassari, and an ordinary assistant a year later. He then acquired the position of permanent lecturer in 1967, holding the chair of Doctrine of the State. In 1949 he contributed to the foundation of the journal Ichnusa. The journal was published, albeit irregularly, until 1964. From 1956 Pigliaru decided to give a different style to the journal, focussing its contents on the so-called 'Sardinian issue' (Questione sarda): the editorials, written by him, were often devoted to the region's problems. The journal was meant to be an intellectual workshop for all young Sardinian intellectuals that wanted to commit to the island's renaissance, and for whom he became an inspiring figure. Pigliaru died on 27 March 1969 in Sassari, during a haemodialysis session, a therapy he regularly undertook to cure his grave kidney deficiency, a condition that had affected him for most of his life.

== Activities ==
Pigliaru wrote several essays of considerable insight, that even nowadays are still considered a crucial reference for any debate on Sardinian culture. Unpublished works surface every now and then. After an initial approach to Giovanni Gentile's philosophy, especially in his first works "Considerazioni critiche su alcuni aspetti del personalismo comunitario" and "Persona umana ed ordinamento giuridico," he leaned towards Giuseppe Capograssi's historicist personalism. He followed Capograssi but re-interpreted his theories with an original reading of it, especially the interpretation of the theory of plurality of legal orders of Santi Romano (see "La vendetta barbaricina come ordinamento giuridico"). He subsequently developed questions of Gramscian Marxism, especially in his "Struttura, soprastruttura e lotta per il diritto", "Gramsci e la cultura sarda" and in the unfinished essay on "L'estinzione dello Stato". Among his several contributions the following are noteworthy: "Meditazioni sul regime penitenziario italiano" (1959); "La piazza e lo Stato" (1961); "Promemoria sull'obiezione di coscienza" (1968). He accompanied his scientific commitment with an intense teaching activity, organising several courses for adults and working class citizens. His pedagogic vocation emerges in "Scuola", a periodical with many authors, founded in 1954 to support and train teachers preparing to be admitted to the profession. He was elected to the regional Committee of the Sardinian section of the Italian Libraries Association (AIB) for 1955–1958 and again 1958–1961. The communal libraries of Orune and Porto Torres are named after him, as well as the Interfaculty Library for Juridical, Political and Economic Sciences of the University of Sassari.

== Essential bibliography ==
- Considerazioni critiche su alcuni aspetti del personalismo comunitari - Sassari, 1950
- Persona umana ed ordinamento giuridico - Milano, 1953 (now Nuoro, 2009 with a Foreword and an Afterword by Giovanni Bianco)
- Meditazioni sul regime penitenziario italiano - Sassari, 1959 (now Nuoro, 2009 with a Foreword and an Afterword by Salvatore Mannuzzu)
- La vendetta barbaricina come ordinamento giuridico - Milano, 1959 (now Nuoro, 2000 with an Introduction by Luigi Lombardi Satriani)
- La piazza e lo Stato - Sassari, 1961
- Sardegna, una civiltà di pietra - Roma, 1961 (with Franco Pinna and Giuseppe Dessì)
- Struttura, soprastruttura e lotta per il diritto - Padova, 1965
- "Promemoria" sull'obiezione di coscienza - Sassari, 1968 (now Nuoro, 2009 with a foreword by Virgilio Mura)
- Gramsci e la cultura sarda - Roma, 1969 (now Nuoro, 2008 with a foreword by Paolo Carta)
- Giovanni Bianco, Osservazioni critiche su Persona umana e ordinamento giuridico di Antonio Pigliaru, in Archivio giuridico F.Serafini, n.3/2025, 377 sgg.

== Posthumous works ==
- Il banditismo in Sardegna - Milano, 1970 and following editions
- Antonio Pigliaru, politica e cultura: antologia degli scritti pubblicati sulla rivista Ichnusa - Sassari, 1971 (edited by Manlio Brigaglia, Salvatore Mannuzzu, Giuseppe Melis Bassu; with texts by Gigi Ghirotti ... et al.)
- Il rispetto dell'uomo - Sassari, 1980 (with a Note by Antonio Delogu)
- Scritti sul fascismo - Sassari, 1983
- La lezione di Capograssi - Roma, 2000 (with an Introduction by Antonio Delogu)
- Saggi capograssiani - Roma, 2010 (with an Introduction by Antonio Delogu)
- Per un primo giorno di scuola: lettera a una professoressa - Sassari, 2002
- Le parole e le cose: alfabeto della democrazia - Sassari, 2005
