= Domenicangela Lina Unali =

Italian academic

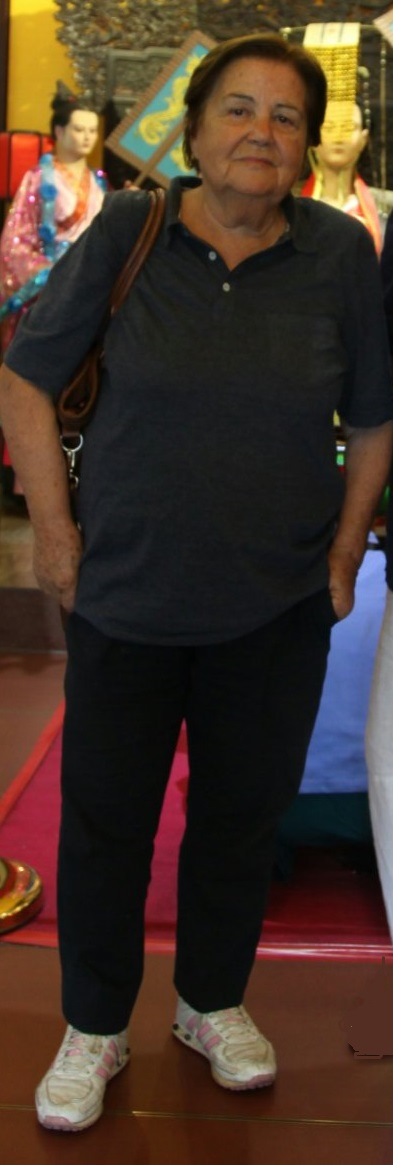
- Unali at Luoyang in 2016
- Born: Domenicangela Unali; 18 November 1936; Rome, Italy
- Died: 15 August 2024 (aged 87); Rome, Italy
- Education: Sapienza University of Rome
- Occupations: Novelist, autobiographical writer, university professor, literary critic
- Writing career
- Genres: fiction, poetry
- Height: 5 ft 2.59 in (1.59 m)
- Notable work: La Sardegna del Desiderio
- Notable awards: Premio Alghero Donna (1995) Premio di Poesia Sant'Agata dei Goti (2019, 2020)

Domenicangela Lina Unali (18 November 1936 – 15 August 2024) was an Italian academic who was professor of English literature at the Faculty of Letters, University of Rome Tor Vergata from 1983. Previously, from 1969 to 1982, she taught at the University of Cagliari. She was Secretary and Treasurer of AISNA (Italian Association for North American Studies) from 1971 to 1973.

== Life and career ==
Born in Rome on 18 November 1936, her parents came from Logudor in North-Eastern Sardinia. Her ancestors, on her mother's side, had the family name of Morla, and in the town of Bortigali according to the parish records they were present since 1680 . A novel by Lina Unali entitled Generale Andaluso is about General Thomas Morla (1751-1811) whom her family considered an ancestor.

Both her father, Gen. Eugenio Unali, and her mother Maria Pinna, daughter of Giuseppina Salaris Morla and of the painter Salvatorico Pinna from the Belle Arti Academy (Accademia di Belle Arti di Roma of Via Ripetta in Rome), founded in 1870, were born in Pozzomaggiore. Her Sardinian origins have been relevant in her life and studies. She is now listed among the authors of contemporary Sardinian literature. she is the author of an online Logudorese-Italian Glossary, published by Babylon, mainly based on her mother's language as she remembered it after her death.

Unali combined scientific research with the writing of poetry and narratives. She published her first narrative, La Sardegna del Desiderio (Sardinia of Desire) in (1991). She received the Alghero Donna National Prize for works of narrative in 1995, the Parola di Donna Prize for works of poetry in 2002 and the same prize for fiction in 2003. At Cagliari, in 2013 she received a special mention in the Fernando Pilia Literary Award for criticism. The book The West in Asia and Asia in the West: Essays on Transnational Interactions is dedicated in tribute to the professional and academic achievements of Unali.

Unali was engaged in research on the relationship between Asia and West. She published the book Talk Story in Chinatown and Away (1998) based on the Conference of the Association of American Studies in Warsaw to which she contributed on a panel. Later on, in the year 2000, the essay "'Complexity is not a Crime': Marianne Moore’s Cultural Poetics" by Eulalia Piñero C. Gil, from the Universidad Autónoma de Madrid, quoting Unali, defined her scholarly profile as both that of an Americanist and of a Sinologist.

A student of Agostino Lombardo at Sapienza University of Rome and an assistant for several years in the Institute then directed by Mario Praz, she continued her studies in the United States with a Fulbright scholarship (1961–62) at the University of Washington in Seattle, where she attended classes on poetry held by Theodore Roethke and in the second semester, moved to the Department of English of Harvard University. Later, she obtained a Fulbright visiting professorship (1972–73) at Harvard University, under the sponsorship of Joel Porte.

In the years 1961-62, she shared her American experience with the economist Pierangelo Garegnani (then at M.I.T. with a Rockefeller Fellowship), whom she married in 1964.

Under the patronage of Jawaharlal Nehru University, she did research on intercultural relations between England and India in the years from 1981 to 1985. She obtained a Fellowship from the Taiwan Academy of Science that engaged her for one year in research and teaching, directing in particular her attention to the study of the Chinese culture and language. She taught several courses at the National Taiwan University among which History of European Thought and American Poetry. She taught at the Somali National University, in the years 1981, 1988 and 1989.

Lina Unali is the honorary president of the Center Asia and the West by her founded in 2008 for the study of the relationships between Europe and Asia.

While in Taipei she published an Anthology of Italian poetry entitled Modern Italian Poetry.

In the academic year 2006-2007, she has been Director of the Doctorate in Foreign Languages and Literatures at the Faculty of Letters of her University.

She was also an established poet, her later compositions were published in the Paterson Literary Review (Paterson, NJ). Unali obtained a certificate of merit at the concorso di poesia "S. Agata dei Goti" 2019 and 2020.

Unali died in Rome on 15 August 2024, at the age of 87.

== Literary criticism ==
- "Poesie di Langston Hughes", Giornale di Poesia, Roma, 1960
- "Marianne Moore", Studi Americani, no. 9, Roma, 1964
- "Introduzione a Edward Dahlberg", Studi Americani, no. 11, Roma, 1965
- Mente e Misura. La Poesia di William Carlos Williams, Edizioni di Storia e Letteratura, Roma, 1970, ISBN 9788884985484
- 'L’Uccello del tuono e la balena'", A Note on a North Western American-Indian Tribe", Conoscenza religiosa, ed. by Elemire Zolla, La Nuova Italia, Firenze, 1970. Reprinted in Cultura indigena d'America, Scritti da "Conoscenza Religiosa" ed. by Grazia Marchianò, Edizioni di Storia e Letteratura, November 2015, ISBN 978-88-6372-786-9
- Margaret Mead, Il Futuro senza volto: continuità nell’evoluzione culturale, translated by Lina Unali, Laterza, Bari, 1972, ISBN A0001874429
- "Sulla Divinity School Address di Ralph Waldo Emerson e sull’uso della parola Soul", Annali delle Facoltà di Lettere-Filosofia e Magistero, vol. XXXVI, 1973, Università degli Studi di Cagliari, Sassari, 1974
- Rivoluzioni a Harvard, capitoli della storia culturale della Nuova Inghilterra, La Nuova Italia, Firenze, 1977, OCLC 4131297
- "Ginsberg non vale a niente Steinbeck è un grande scrittore...", Paese Sera Libri, Sunday, September 11, 1977
- "Un 'Tributo' al grande poeta","Quel viaggio in Taxi con Robert Lowell", Paese Sera Libri, Friday, September 7, 1979
- "Metaphorical and Spiritual Language in No Cross No Crown by William Penn", Annali della Facoltà di Magistero, Cagliari, 1979
- Descrizione di sé. Studio della scrittura autobiografica del ’700, Lucarini, Roma, 1979, ISBN 9788870331318
- Yuri Lotman, "Sulla poesia: Testo e Sistema" (the final chapters of Analiž poetičeskogo teksta: stryktyra sticha), ed. by Simonetta Salvestroni and Lina Unali (trans. by Lina Unali pp. 133-140), in "Problemi", no. 52, May August, 1978, G.B. Palumbo, Roma
- "Percorsi su carta dell’emigrato franco-canadese Jack Kerouac" in Il Ponte, Year XXXVII, nos. 11-12, La Nuova Italia, Firenze, November 30 - December 31, 1981
- "Peculiarities in the immigration to America of Sardinians from Carloforte, 1900-1930", (Franco Mulas co-author), in Struggle and Support, Proceedings of the Italian Historical Society of America, New York, 1983
- "Italy, France and Spain in Paterson by William Carlos Williams" in Cross-Cultural Studies, American, Canadian and European Literatures: 1945-1985, ed. by Mirko Jurak, University of Ljiubliana, Ljiubliana, 1988
- "Mount Allegro and the Euro-American Common Denominators", in The Future of American Modernism: Ethnic Writing Between the Wars, ed. by W. Boelhower, VU Amsterdam Press, Amsterdam, 1990, pp. 202-216, ISBN 9789062569175
- "A Progress Report on the Orality of Sardinian Migration to America" in Victorianism in the United States. Its Era and Legacy, VU University Press, Amsterdam, 1992, ISBN 9053831177
- Stella d'India: Temi imperiali e rappresentazioni dell'India, Edizioni Mediterranee, Roma, 1993, ISBN 9788827202883
- "Silence of the ethnic cradle, the noise of America, The control of noise" in Technology and the American Imagination: An ongoing Challenge, RSA, Rivista di Studi Americani, 1994
- "Immigrants in Mainstream American Literature", in Ethnic Literature and Culture in the US, Canada and Australia, ed. by Igor Maver, Peter Lang, Frankfurt am Main, Berlin, New York, 1996, ISBN 9780820429724
- "Conferma del mito shakespeariano in The Herbal Bed di Peter Whelan", in Mitos, Actas del VII Congreso Internacional de la Asociación Española de Semiótica, ed. by Túa Blesa, Universidad de Zaragoza, Zaragoza, 1998
- Talk-Story in Chinatown and Away, Essays on Chinese American Literature and US-China Relationships, ed. with introduction by Lina Unali, Sun Moon Lake, Roma, 1998, ISBN 88-87332-01-0
- "Americanization and Hybridization in The Hundred Secret Senses by Amy Tan" in Hitting Critical Mass, European Perspectives on Ethnicity, ed. by R. Davis, University of California, Berkeley, 1998
- "The Chinese Martial Arts in Chinese American Writers" in "Englishes", no. 7, year III, Pagine, Roma, 1999 ISSN 1593-2494
- "Un edificio di Sabbia. Da Gregory Bateson a Mary Catherine Bateson e le tendenze anti-accademiche nella tradizione letteraria americana" in Metamorfosi della Parola tra Letteratura e Filosofia, ed. by Lia Secci, Artemide Edizioni, Roma, 2001, ISBN 88-86291-78-7
- "The sense of suspense in politically troubled waters: Parents and Politics in Jerre Mangione’s To Walk the Night and Lan Cao’s Monkey Bridge" in Asia and the West. A Difficult Intercontinental Relationship, Proceedings of the II AW-dir Annual Conference December 19–21, 2001, ed. by Elisabetta Marino, Sun Moon Lake, Roma, 2003, pp. 38-49, ISBN 88-87332-06-1
- "A Case of Double Logic in Amy Tan’s The Bonesetter’s Daughter with a Comparison with Honoré de Balzac’s The Accursed Child" in The Cultural Shuttle: The United States of/in Europe, ed. by V. Béghain e M. Chénetier, VU University Press, Amsterdam, 2004, pp. 229-236, ISBN 9789053839492
- Asia and the West. The Body the Gods, Proceedings of the III AW-dir Annual Conference December 19–21, 2002, ed. with introduction by Lina Unali, Sun Moon Lake, Roma, 2004, ISBN 88-87332-08-8
- "L’integrazione delle arti nel film Hero (titolo cinese: Ying Xiong) di Zhang Yi Mou", May 2006
- Lina Unali and Aiping Zhang, "Chinese Ancestors in Ancient and Modern China", Testo e Senso, no. 7, 2006, ISSN 2036-2293
- New Asian American Writers and News from UK, Italy and Asia: Literature and the Visual Arts, Vol. I, ed. with introduction by Lina Unali, SML Telematic Edition, 2006, ISBN 88-87332-12-6
- "Americanization and hybridization in The hundred secret senses by Amy Tan" in Amy Tan, ed. and with introduction by Harold Bloom, Bloom’s Literary Criticism, Chelsea House, New York, 2009, pp. 113-120, ISBN 9781438117133
- Una Città tra Oriente e Occidente. Istambul Shanghai (A City between East and West. Istambul Shanghai), Vol. I, ed. with introduction by Lina Unali, SML Telematic Edition, 2010, ISBN 88-87332-14-2
- "Figure bizantine nelle novelle di Grazia Deledda", in Dalla quercia del monte al cedro del Libano. Le novelle di Grazia Deledda, ed. by Giovanni Pirodda, ISRE Edizioni - AIPSA Edizioni, Cagliari, 2010, pp. 45-52, ISBN 978-88-96094-16-7
- Eugenio Unali, Elementi di Equitazione. L’addestramento, ed. by Lina Unali, Lago Sole Luna, Kindle Edition, 2012
- Rapporto sulla Cina, Editori Riuniti University Press, Roma, 2013, ISBN 978-88-6473-096-7
- "Ad Alatri negli altri luoghi di Grazia Deledda", in L’Unione Sarda, April 4, 2014
- Beautiful China, Cambridge Scholars Publishing, Newcastle upon Tyne, 2016, ISBN 978-1-4438-9098-4
- William Shakespeare amidst Monarchs, Revolutions and Actors, Lago Sole Luna, c. 2019 ISBN 978-88-87332-20-9

== Narratives ==
- La Sardegna del desiderio, Ripostes, Roma, Salerno, 1991
- Il seme dell’Acero, Esperienze della Sardegna, Carìa, Cagliari, 1977
- Trilogia della Somalia musulmana, Il Grappolo, Salerno, 2001 ISBN 9788888207223
- Viaggio a Istambul, Edes, Biblioteca di Babele, A series directed by Nicola Tanda, Sassari, 2009, ISBN 8860251044
- Andalusian General. A narrative of Sardinia and Spain, Edes, Sassari, 2010, OCLC 725829055
- My Digital Talk Story, Editori Riuniti, Rome, 2015, ISBN 978-88-359-6104-8

== Poetry ==
- "Sartiglia", Translation in Gaelic of the poem "Sartiglia" published in Agus, no. 24, Dublin, 1984
- Sarde poesie della mente, Sun Moon Lake, Rome, 2008, ISBN 88-87332-13-4
- Winter in Pearl Street (Kindle Edition), ISBN 978-88-359-6104-8
- Lina Unali, Tropismi di persona, in Joran, Aletti Editore, 2015, ISBN 978-88-591-2571-6
- La grande pioggia e il fiume, EDES, 2017, ISBN 978-88-6025-406-1

== Other notable activities ==
- Instructor of Tai Chi Chuan at the School of Master Li Rong Mei
- Youtube, Inventario di quel che mi hai dato (Inventory of what you gave to me) 2013 August 25 (videopoetry)
- An old Sardinian recipe in The MELUS Family Cookbook, Society of Multi-Ethnic Literatures of the United States, 2005
- Trilingual Deposit an online Interview
- Online Logudorese Italian Glossary

== Bibliography ==
- Prof. Lina Unali’s page on the University of Rome Torvergata Website
- Presentation of Lina Unali by the Italian Publisher Editori Riuniti University Press
- "Review: Unali, Mente e misura: La poesia di William Carlos Williams", in American Literature, Vol. 43, No. 1 (March, 1971), pp. 670-671
- Roger Asselineau, "Unali, L.: Descrizione di sé", in Études anglaises: Grande-Bretagne, États-Unis, Volume 34, ed. by Charles Cestre and Aurélien Digeon, H. Didier, 1981, p. 493. (The main interest of the article is Asselineau's analysis of Lina Unali's classification of American autobiographies, starting from William Penn's Some Fruits of Solitude).
- Richard Beck, Introduction to MM: The Sentence Commuted
- E. Marino, "Toast a Lina Unali", in Sincronie: rivista semestrale di letterature, teatro e sistemi di pensiero, Volume 9, Edizione 17 -Volume 10, Edizione 20, Vecchiarelli, 2006, pp. 261–264.
- Review to Lina Unali's Il racconto digitale by Martina Volpe in Testo e Senso, no. 15, 2014, pp. 211–213
