= Sardinian =

Sardinian refers to anything related to the Mediterranean island of Sardinia. More specifically it can refer to:

- Sardinians, the ethnic group indigenous to Sardinia
- History of Sardinia
- Sardinian language
- Sardinian literature
- Music of Sardinia
- Cuisine of Sardinia
- Sarda sheep, a breed sometimes known as the Sardinian sheep
