= The Day of Judgment (novel) =

1977 novel by Salvatore Satta

- First edition (Italian)
- Author: Salvatore Satta
- Original title: Il giorno del giudizio
- Language: Italian
- Genre: Historical novel
- Publication date: 1977 (first edition)
- Publication place: Italy
- Media type: Print (hardback and paperback)

The Day of Judgment is a novel written by Sardinian jurist and writer Salvatore Satta.

It was published in 1977, after his death. Translated in different languages, it was widely read across Europe.
