= Sa Laurera =

1976 anthropological essay by Giulio Angioni

- First edition
- Author: Giulio Angioni
- Original title: Sa laurera
- Language: Italian and sardish
- Genre: anthropological essay
- Publisher: Edes and Il Maestrale
- Publication date: 1976 and 2003
- Publication place: Italy (Sardinia)
- Media type: Print (hardcover)
- Pages: 311
- ISBN: 978-88-86109-69-7

Sa laurera (Peasant's labour in Sardinia) is an anthropological essay by Giulio Angioni, published by Edes in 1976 and by Il Mestrale in 2003.

Sa laurera (from Catalan "arar", "cultivar") is an accurate record of operations, seasonal phases, ways of working and vocabulary (with original illustrations) carried out by peasants in traditional Sardinia, before the great transformation in the second half of the twentieth century.

Sa laurera is to be considered along with other books by Giulio Angioni: Rapporti di produzione e cultura subalterna: contadini in Sardegna, Edes 1974; I pascoli erranti: antropologia del pastore in Sardegna, Liguori 1989; L'architettura popolare in Italia: Sardegna (with A. Sanna), Laterza 1988; Pane e formaggio e altre cose di Sardegna, Zonza 2002.
