= Sellerio Editore =

Italian publishing house

Sellerio Editore S.r.l.
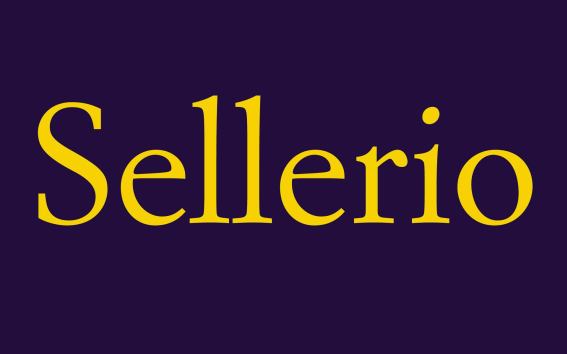
- Type: Società a responsabilità limitata
- Industry: Publishing
- Founded: 1969 (Palermo, Italy)
- Headquarters: Palermo, Italy
- Products: Books
- Services: Publishing of books
- Revenue: €12.2 million (2018)
- Website: sellerio.it

Sellerio Editore is an Italian publisher founded in 1969 in Palermo, by Elvira Giorgianni and her husband Enzo Sellerio, encouraged by the writer Leonardo Sciascia and the anthropologist Antonino Buttitta.

== History ==
After some titles published in the first collection, of suggestive name La civiltà perfezionata (The improved civilization), the publisher gained visibility with the publication in 1978 of Leonardo Sciascia's L'affaire Moro (The case Aldo Moro). From then on the number of collections grows, starting with La memoria (The memory), today practically a symbol of the italian publisher.

Among the writers who have collaborated with the publishing house: Gesualdo Bufalino, launched in 1981, winner of the Campiello Prize and Strega Prize and Andrea Camilleri ("father" of Montalbano).

From 1983 onwards Elvira Sellerio started to dedicate herself only to narrative and essay publications while Enzo Sellerio started to take care of art and photography publications. Among the collections that have gradually been constituted are also specialized series, such as La città antica (The ancient city), from classical culture, and the Sicilian Library of History and Literature (Sicilian Library of history and letteratura).

By 2020 the Sellerio catalog has more than three thousand titles.

After the death of Elvira Sellerio in 2010 the publisher continues to be under the direction of the founder Enzo Sellerio, together with his son Antonio and Olivia Sellerio, in addition to the researcher Salvatore Silvano Nigro.

== Italian writers ==
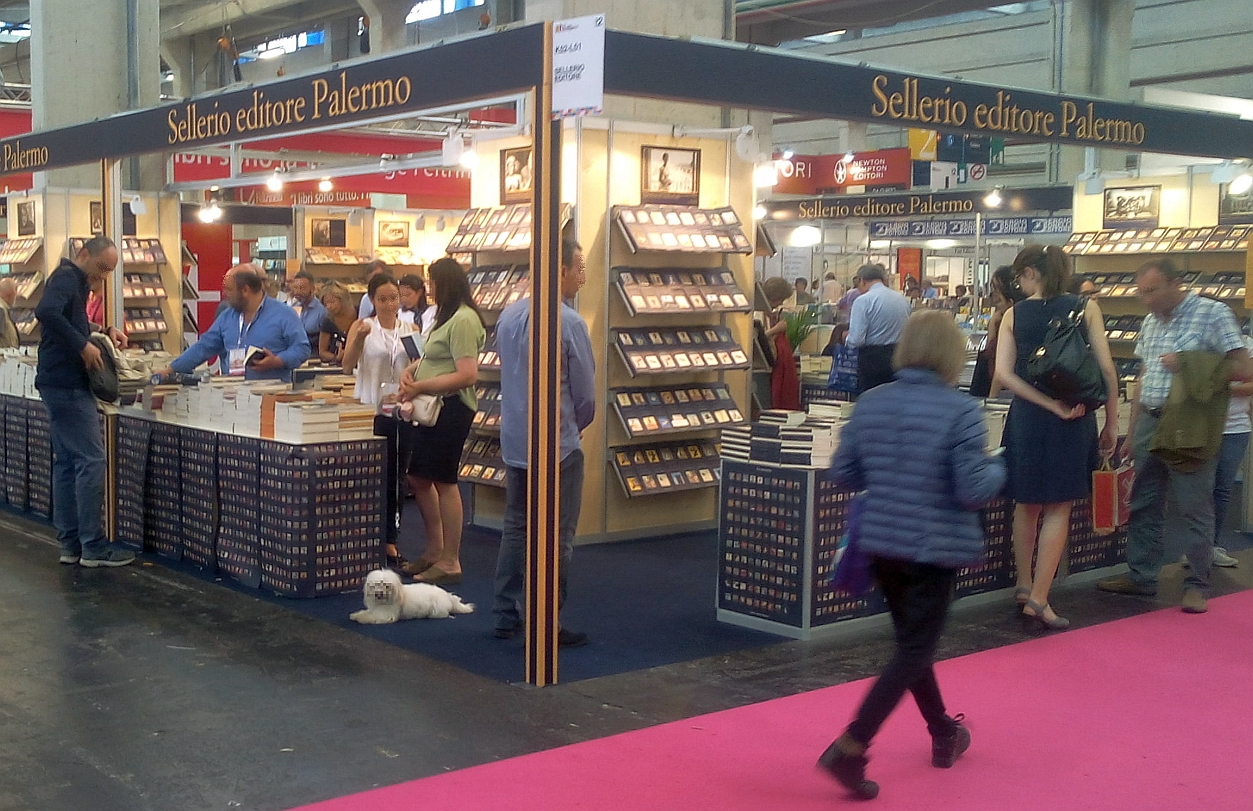
The Sellerio stand at the Salone del libro in 2017.

- Luisa Adorno
- Sebastiano Aglianò
- Giulio Angioni
- Maria Attanasio
- Sergio Atzeni
- Gesualdo Bufalino
- Davide Camarrone
- Andrea Camilleri
- Luciano Canfora
- Gianrico Carofiglio
- Vincenzo Consolo
- Ugo Cornia
- Augusto De Angelis
- Marco Ferrari
- Pietro Grossi
- Carlo Lucarelli
- Marco Malvaldi
- Antonio Manzini
- Lorenza Mazzetti
- Giovanni Merenda
- Maria Messina
- Andrea Molesini
- Angelo Morino
- Laura Pariani
- Santo Piazzese
- Alessandro Robecchi
- Francesco Recami
- Federico Maria Sardelli
- Gaetano Savatteri
- Furio Scarpelli
- Giorgio Scerbanenco
- Leonardo Sciascia
- Adriano Sofri
- Fabio Stassi
- Antonio Tabucchi
- Turi Vasile
- Giosuè Calaciura

== Authors translated into Italian ==
- Héctor Bianciotti
- Roberto Bolaño
- Sergej Donatovič Dovlatov
- Margaret Doody
- Alicia Giménez Bartlett
- Friedrich Glauser
- Geoffrey Holiday Hall
- Nathaniel Hawthorne
- Dominique Manotti
- Manuel Vázquez Montalbán
- Ben Pastor
- Vincent Schiavelli
- Maj Sjöwall
- Per Wahlöö
- Anthony Trollope
- José Maria Eça de Queirós

== Book series ==
- La memoria
- La rosa dei venti
- Il contesto
- Il divano
- Alle 8 di sera
- Nuovo prisma
- La nuova diagonale
- Galleria
- Le indagini di Montalbano
- Biblioteca siciliana di storia e letteratura
- Corti
- Il castello
- Il gioco delle parti. Romanzi giudiziari
- Il mare
- La diagonale
- Le parole e le cose
- Tutto e subito
- Fine secolo
- Quaderni della Biblioteca siciliana di storia e letteratura
- L'Italia
- La città antica
- Teatro
- Nuovo Museo
- L'isola
- La civiltà perfezionata
- Fantascienza
- Prisma
- Museo
- La pietra vissuta
- Le favole mistiche
- Fuori collana
- App
- Narrativa per la scuola
- La memoria illustrata
- I cristalli
- I cristallini
- Varia
- Cataloghi
- Bel vedere
- Diorama
- L'occhio di vetro
- La Cuba

== Television series based on Sellerio books ==
- Inspector Montalbano – Le indagini di Montalbano
- The Young Montalbano – La memoria
