= Claude Calame =

Swiss mythographer (born 1943)

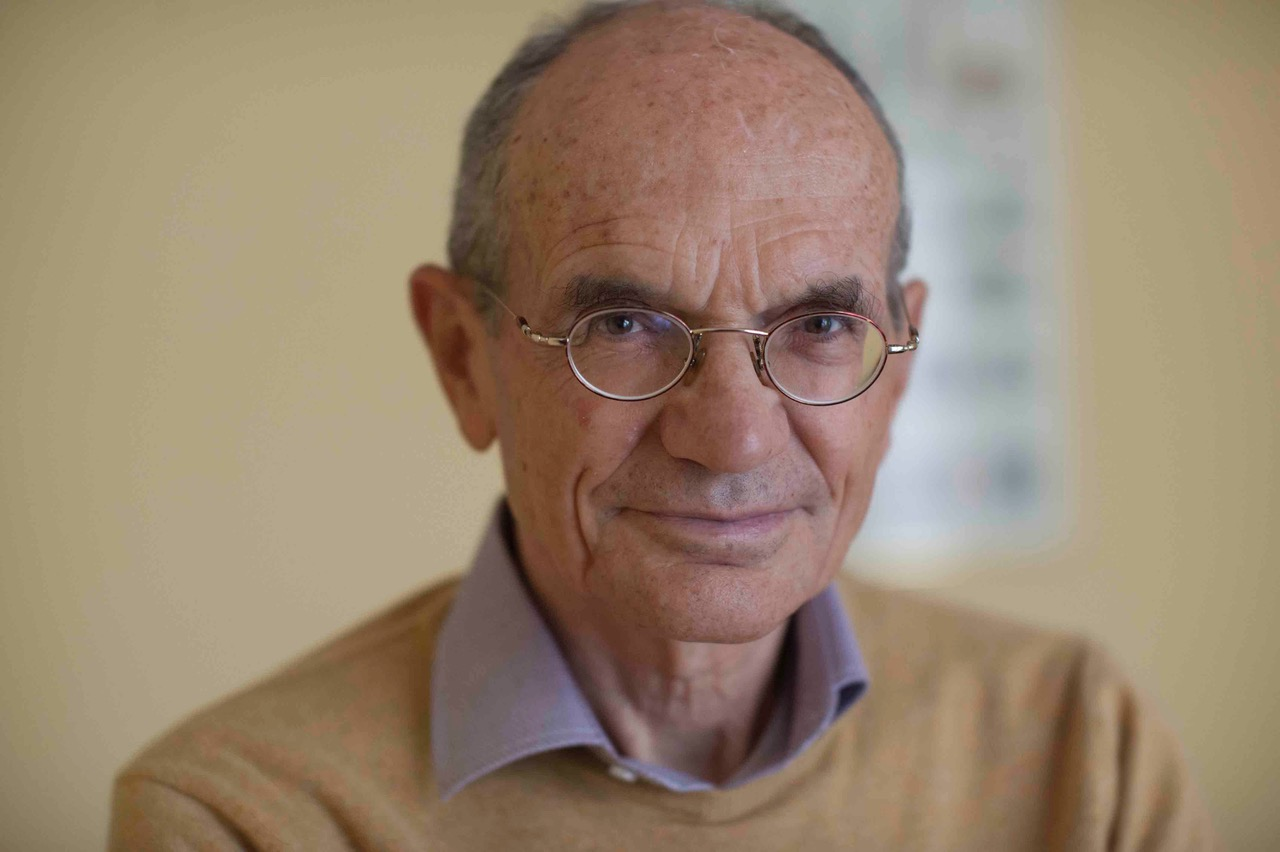
- Born: 1943 (age 82–83); Lausanne
- Citizenship: Swiss
- Occupations: Writer, Philologist, Scholar
- Writing career
- Genre: Classic
- Subject: Greek mythology
- Notable works: The Poetics of Eros in Ancient Greece (1999); In Myth and History in Ancient Greece: The Symbolic Creation of a Colony (2003)

Claude Calame (born 1943 in Lausanne) is a Swiss writer on Greek mythology and the structure of mythic narrative from the perspective of a Hellenist trained in semiotics and ethnology (ethnopoetics) as well as philology. He was a professor of Greek language and literature at the University of Lausanne and is now Director of Studies at the School for Advanced Studies in the Social Sciences, in Paris. He taught also at the Universities of Urbino and Siena in Italy, and at Yale University in the US.

== Academic career ==
Calame began his academic career teaching Greek language and literature at the Faculty of Arts of the University of Lausanne, where he also chaired the Interfaculty Department of History and Sciences of Religions. He has held teaching positions at the University of Urbino in Italy, Yale University in the United States, the Doctoral School in Human Sciences at the University of Siena, and the Collegio San Carlo of Modena. He is a member of the Accadmia delle scienze di Torino. In addition to his academic work in Europe and the United States, he conducted brief fieldwork in the Sepik region of Papua New Guinea, further shaping his comparative and anthropological methodologies.

== Research ==
Calame’s scholarship explores the poetic and symbolic dimensions of ancient Greek culture, particularly through the lens of ritual and performance.

His work emphasizes the pragmatic and enunciative aspects of poetic discourse in ancient Greece from Homeric epic to choral lyric and Attic tragedy arguing for a performative model of meaning rooted in cultural memory, social practice, and religious ritual. He describes this as a form of "anthropopoiesis", or the cultural shaping of human identity through ritualized song and myth.

His research integrates narratology, semiotics, and comparative anthropology, with a strong emphasis on the challenges of translating cultural and discursive practices across historical contexts.

== Scholarly work ==
Claude Calame’s scholarly work is marked by an interdisciplinary approach that blends classical philology, semiotics, historical anthropology, narratology, and discourse analysis.

His research investigates the performative and pragmatic functions of ancient Greek poetic language, particularly within ritual, religious, and educational contexts.

Calame has also engaged in a sustained dialogue with Michel Foucault’s History of Sexuality, critiquing its androcentric focus and its neglect of mythic narratives and forms of ritual poetry as far as Ancient Greece is concerned. Referring in particular to the poems of Sappho and to the various episodes and versions of the myth of Helen, Calame emphasizes how poetic narratives stage gender relations and moral values within pragmatic and ritual contexts.

Among his major publications, The Poetics of Eros in Ancient Greece (1999) presents a comprehensive study of the deity Eros, analyzing the discourse of desire in ancient poetry beyond the paradigm of dominance and submission. In Myth and History in Ancient Greece: The Symbolic Creation of a Colony (2003), he explores the use of myth in the legitimation of colonial foundations, showing how narrative structures and poetic performances contribute to historical identity.

His book Greek Mythology: Poetics, Pragmatics and Fiction (2009), originally published in French in 2000 and translated by Janet Lloyd, treats myth as poetic fiction with social and epistemological functions, bridging Aristotle’s poetics with contemporary semiotic theory.

Calame’s earlier work, The Craft of Poetic Speech in Ancient Greece (1995), investigates the linguistic and ritual dimensions of poetic performance in ancient civic and religious life. In Masks of Authority: Fiction and Pragmatics in Ancient Greek Poetics (2005), he examines how the fictional nature of poetic enunciation constructs institutional authority.

His most recent major study, Choral Tragedy. Greek Poetics and Musical Ritual (2024), offers an anthropological and ethnopoetic reading of Athenian drama, highlighting its choral dimension and its function within musical and civic ritual.

Through this extensive body of work, Calame has significantly shaped modern understanding of ancient Greek poetry as a form of cultural practice situated, performative, and fundamentally embedded in the social and ritual life of the polis.

He thinks that the anthropological approach of the institutional and cultural realizations of Ancient Greece brings us to be critical towards the different social, political and cultural challenges we are facing in the present period, submitted to the neoliberal and authoritarian ideology of globalized capitalism.

In this perspective in 2023, Calame published Humans and their Environment. Beyond the Nature/Culture Opposition which examines how ancient and modern discourses shape the relationship between humans and their environment. The book argues for moving beyond the traditional dichotomy of nature and culture, emphasizing ecological interdependence and the ethical dimensions of human technical actions: anthropopoiesis and ecopoiesis.

And in 2024, he published Déni d’humanité (Denial of Humanity, Paris, Éditions du Croquant), a critical essay analyzing the European Union's refugee policy, which he characterizes as an ethical and political scandal. In this work, Calame argues that most migrants and refugees are victims of wars, socio-economic crises, and environmental disasters many of which have roots in neo-colonial interventions and global inequalities for which European powers bear significant responsibility.

== Selected publications ==
- Calame, Claude; Calame, Claude; Calame, Claude (1997). Choruses of young women in ancient Greece: their morphology, religious role, and social function. Greek studies: interdisciplinary approaches. Lanham, Mld.: Rowman & Littlefield. ISBN 978-0-8226-3063-0.
- Calame, Claude; Orion, Janice (1995). The craft of poetic speech in ancient Greece. Myth and poetics. Ithaca: Cornell University Press. ISBN 978-0-8014-2743-5.
- Calame, Claude; Lloyd, Janet (1999). The Poetics of Eros in Ancient Greece. Princeton University Press. ISBN 978-0-691-15943-0. JSTOR j.ctt46n3z9.
- Calame, Claude (2018). Thésée et l'imaginaire athénien - Claude Calame - Éditions La Découverte. La Découverte. ISBN 9782707195272.
- Calame, Claude (1996). Mythe et histoire dans l'antiquité grecque: la création symbolique d'une colonie. Sciences humaines. Lausanne: Editions Payot. ISBN 978-2-601-03189-8.
- Calame, Claude; Lloyd, Janet; Calame, Claude (2009). Greek mythology: poetics, pragmatics and fiction. Cambridge: Cambridge Univ. Press. ISBN 978-0-521-88858-5.
- Calame, Claude (2010). Prométhée généticien: profits techniques et usages de métaphores. À présent. La Versanne] : [Paris: Encre marine ; Belles Lettres. ISBN 978-2-35088-022-8.
- Calame, Claude (2015). Qu'est-ce que la mythologie grecque ?. Folio. Paris: Gallimard. ISBN 978-2-07-044578-3.
- Calame, Claude (2024). Choral tragedy: Greek poetics and musical ritual. Classical scholarship in translation. Translated by Casato, Vanessa. Cambridge New York, NY Port Melbourne New Delhi Singepore: Cambridge University Press. ISBN 978-1-009-01442-7.
