= Sard, Lorestan =

Sard سرد
- Village
- Location within Iran
- Coordinates: 32°59′00″N 48°55′29″E
- Country: Iran
- Province: Lorestan
- County: Aligudarz
- Bakhsh: Zaz and Mahru
- Rural District: Mahru

Population (2006)
  - Total: 55
- Time zone: UTC+3:30 (IRST)
  - Summer (DST): UTC+4:30 (IRDT)

Sard (Persian: سرد, also known as Sard Kūl-e Rād) is a village in Mahru Rural District, Zaz and Mahru District, Aligudarz County, Lorestan Province, Iran. At the 2006 census, its population was 55, in 9 families.
