= Joseph Zatrillas Vico =

Poet, writer and politician

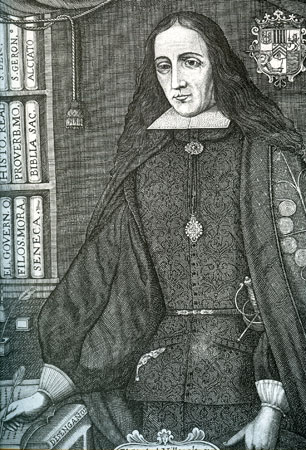
Joseph Zatrillas y Vico

Joseph Zatrillas Vico, (Cagliari – Sardinia, 21 August 1648 – France 1720) was a poet, writer, and politician. He was born to a noble Sardinian family when the kingdom of Sardinia was part of the Spanish crown.

From 1688 to 1698 he was in Parliament of the Kingdom of Sardinia, in 1701 was named "Marquis de Villaclara" by Philip V of Spain but in 1706, but during the succession dispute, he was accused of treason by the Spanish Crown and forced into exile in Toulon.

He is the author of two works: 'Poema heroico' (heroic poem) dedicated to Mexican poet sister Juana Inés de la Cruz and the novel 'Engaños y desengaños del profano amor'.

== Works ==
- Poema heroico al merecido a/plauso del el unico Oraculo de/las/Musas, glorioso assombro de los Ingenios, y/Ce/lebre Phenix de la Poesia, la Esclarecida y Ve/ne/rable Señora, Suor Juana Ines de la Cruz Religiosa Professa en el Monasterio de San Geronimo de la Imperial Ciudad de Mexico, Barcelona, 1696
- Engaños y desengaños del amor profano, Napoles, 1687–88, duos tomos

== Bibliography ==
- (in Italian) G. C. Marras, Un poema sardo-ispano per suor Juana Inès de la Cruz, in AA. VV., G. C. Marras, (a cura di), Lingue, segni, identità nella Sardegna moderna, Rome, 2000 ISBN 978-88-430-1495-8
- (in Italian) L. Spanu, Monografia di Giuseppe Zatrilla, Cagliari, 1992
