= Giorgio Todde =

Italian writer (1951–2020)

- Born: 17 September 1951; Cagliari, Italy
- Died: 29 July 2020 (aged 68); Cagliari, Italy
- Occupation: Writer

Giorgio Todde (17 September 1951 – 29 July 2020) was an Italian writer of crime novels.

== Biography ==
Todde started his career as a surgeon and ophthalmologist in Cagliari. He participated in the Sardinian Literary Spring and influence of 19th-century Sardinia. Published in 2002, Lo stalo delle anime, his first novel, is a historical thriller set in 1893 which features the doctor Efisio Marini. Marini was a historical character who really existed and invented a method of petrifying bodies. Marini was a recurrence in Todde's works, as he was featured in Paura e carne, E quale amor non-cambia, and L’estremo delle cose. Todde also created another crime investigator named Manlio Ferfuzio, who appeared in La matta bestialità.

Giorgio Todde died on 29 July 2020, in Cagliari at the age of 68.

== Novels ==
- Lo stato delle anime (2002)
- La matta bestialità (2002)
- Paura e carne (2003)
- L'occhiata letale (2004)
- Ei (2004)
- E quale amor non-cambia (2005)
- Al caffè del silenzio (2007)
- L'estremo delle cose (2007)
- Dieci gocce (2009)
- Il noce. Scritti sull'isola rinnegata (2010)
- Le Indigani dell’imbalsamatore (2011)
- Lettera ultima (2013)
