= Mondher Kilani =

- Born: January 18, 1948 (age 78); Gafsa, Tunisia
- Awards: François Hauser Prize

Academic background
- Education: School for Advanced Studies in the Social Sciences; University of Lausanne

Academic work
- Discipline: anthropology sociology
- Institutions: University of Lausanne
- Notable works: Lausanne Manifesto: Toward a Non-Hegemonic Anthropology

Mondher Kilani (born January 18, 1948) is a Swiss-Tunisian anthropologist and honorary professor at the University of Lausanne.

== Life ==
Mondher Kilani was born on January 18, 1948, in Gafsa, Tunisia. He completed all of his schooling there before leaving his homeland for political reasons.

After obtaining an advanced studies diploma from the School for Advanced Studies in the Social Sciences in Paris in 1977, Mondher Kilani earned a doctorate in anthropology and sociology from the University of Lausanne in 1983. Between 1989 and 1990, he was an associate researcher in the Department of Anthropology at the University of California in Berkeley.

Mondher Kilani was appointed assistant professor at the University of Lausanne in 1985, and then became a full professor in 1991. He served as dean of the Faculty of Social and Political Sciences from 1998 to 2000 and headed the Institute of Anthropology and Sociology from 2001 to 2009, as well as the Laboratory of Cultural and Social Anthropology from 2009 onward. He retired in 2013 and was named an honorary professor of the University of Lausanne that same year.

He is a member of the Académie tunisienne des sciences, des lettres et des arts «Beit al-Hikma» since 2013.

In 2011, Mondher Kilani and other academics published the Lausanne Manifesto: Toward a Non-Hegemonic Anthropology, whose aim was to de-Westernize anthropology and open it up to a multi-centered perspective. The manifesto led to the creation of the online dictionary Anthropen in 2014, whose objective is to provide up-to-date, open-access knowledge in the field of cultural studies. To date, the dictionary has published more than 300 entries. It has also prompted reflection on the challenges of scholarly publishing in an environment dominated by major international publishing groups.

Mondher Kilani participated as a co-author in the performance Concours européen de la chanson philosophique (European Contest of the Philosophical Song), set to music and staged by the Claire de Ribeaupierre & Massimo Furlan company, which toured Europe between 2019 and 2020. Between 2022 and 2024, he co-wrote and performed in the play Au Milieu des terres, produced by the GdRA company. The play focuses on the Mediterranean Sea, exploring it through its biodiversity and geological history, as well as through its historical and cultural diversity. The production combines text, music, singing, and dance, and was presented in Switzerland, France, and Morocco.

== Awards ==
- 1983: François Hauser Prize from the Faculty of Social and Political Sciences at the University of Lausanne for his doctoral thesis in anthropology.

== Publications ==
=== Works ===
- Méditerranée. Récits du milieu des terres, Malvezie, Éditions Dépaysage, 2024, 99 p. ISBN 978-2-902039-54-8
- Comment l'esprit des femmes vient aux hommes et autres sujets remarquables (in French). Vevey: Éditions de l'Aire. 2021. p. 329. ISBN 978-2-88956-187-2
- Du goût de l'autre. Fragments d'un discours cannibale (in French). Paris: Éditions du Seuil. 2018. p. 384. (ISBN 978-2-02-134002-0)
- Tunisie. Carnets d'une révolution (in French). Paris: Pétra. 2014. p. 321. ISBN 978-2-84743-093-6.
- Pour un universalisme critique. Essai d'anthropologie du contemporain (in French). Paris: La Découverte. 2014. p. 350. ISBN 978-2-7071-7774-2
- Anthropologie. Du local au global (in French). Paris: Armand Colin. 2012. p. 400. ISBN 978-2-200-27821-2.
- Guerre et sacrifice. La violence extrême (in French). Paris: Presses universitaires de France. 2006. p. 140. (EAN 9782130556350)
- L'universalisme américain et les banlieues de l'humanité (in French). Lausanne: Payot. 2002. p. 103. ISBN 2-601-03304-5.
- Kilani, Mondher; Waziri, M. (2000). Gomba Hausa. Dynamique du changement dans un village sahélien du Niger (in French). Lausanne: Payot. p. 180. ISBN 2-601-03254-5
- L'invention de l'Autre. Essais sur le discours anthropologique (in French). Lausanne: Payot. 1992. p. 319. ISBN 2-601-03267-7.
- La construction de la mémoire. Le lignage et la sainteté dans l'oasis d'El Ksar (in French). Genève: Labor et Fides. 1992. p. 342. ISBN 2-8309-0642-X
- Introduction à l'anthropologie (in French). Lausanne: Payot. 1989. p. 368. ISBN 2-601-03046-1.
- Les cultes du cargo mélanésiens. Mythe et rationalité en anthropologie (in French). Lausanne: Éditions d'en bas. 1983. p. 205. ISBN 2-8290-0042-0

=== Works in collaboration ===
- Sogetto, persona e fabbricazzione dell’identità. Casi antropologici e concetti filosofici, avec S. Barberani, S. Borutti, C. Calame, C. Mattalucci, L.Vanzago, Milano, Mimesis, 2015, 162 pages.
- Manifeste de Lausanne. Pour une anthropologie non hégémonique, avec F. Saillant et F. Graezer Bideau (dir.), Montréal, Liber, 2011, 142 pages.
- Histoires de vie, témoignages, autobiographies de terrain. Formes d’énonciation et de textualisation, avec Gabriella D’Agostino et Stefano Montès (dir.), Berlin, LIT Verlag, 2010, 289 pages.
- Figures de l’humain. Les représentations de l’anthropologie. Paris, Éditions de l'EHESS, avec F. Affergan, S. Borutti, C. Calame, U. Fabietti et F. Remotti, 2003, 355 pages.
- L’imbroglio ethnique en quatorze mots clés, avec R. Gallissot et A. Rivera, Lausanne, Payot, 2000, 250 pages.
- La fabrication de l’humain dans les cultures et en anthropologie, avec C. Calame (dir.), Lausanne, Payot, 1999, 165 pages.
- Islam et changement social (dir.), Lausanne, Payot, 1998, 348 pages.
- Universalisme et relativisme. Un débat d’actualité, avec G. Berthoud, P. Centlivres et C. Giordano (dir.), Fribourg, Presses Universitaires de Fribourg, 1993, 187 pages.
- Le discours anthropologique. Description, narration, savoir, Paris, Méridiens-Klincksieck, avec J.‑M. Adam, M.‑J. Borel, C. Calame, 1990, 306 pages.
