= Giulio Angioni =

Italian writer and anthropologist

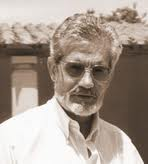
- Angioni in 2010
- Born: 28 October 1939; Guasila, Sardinia, Kingdom of Italy
- Died: 12 January 2017 (aged 77); Settimo San Pietro, Sardinia, Italy
- Occupations: Novelist, essayist
- Writing career
- Notable works: Le fiamme di Toledo; Assandira

Giulio Angioni (28 October 1939 – 12 January 2017) was an Italian writer and anthropologist.

== Biography ==
Angioni was a leading Italian anthropologist, professor at the University of Cagliari and fellow of St Antony's College of the University of Oxford. He is the author of about twenty books of fiction and a dozen volumes of essays in anthropology.

In his anthropological essays (especially in Fare, dire, sentire: l’identico e il diverso nelle culture, 2011), Angioni places the variety of forms of the human life in a dimension of maximum amplitude of time and space, starting from the anthropopoietic value of doing, saying, thinking and feeling as interrelated dimensions (although usually separate and hierarchical) of human 'nature', which here is understood as characterized by culture, i.e. the human ability of continuous learning. In particular Angioni criticizes two western clichés: the superiority of speech as a solely human feature, and the separateness of the aesthetic dimension from the rest of life.

Best known as a writer, Angioni is considered, along with Sergio Atzeni and Salvatore Mannuzzu, to have been one of the initiators of a so-called Sardinian Literary Spring, the Sardinian narrative of today in the European arena (with the work of authors such as Salvatore Niffoi, Alberto Capitta, Giorgio Todde, Michela Murgia and many others), which followed the works of individual prominent figures such as Grazia Deledda, Emilio Lussu, Giuseppe Dessì, Gavino Ledda, Salvatore Satta.

The best novels of Angioni are considered to be Le fiamme di Toledo (Flames of Toledo), Assandira, Doppio cielo (Double sky), L'oro di Fraus (The gold of Fraus). His poetic works (Tempus in 2008, Oremari in 2011) in Sardinian language and Italian came later in his career.

== Literary works ==
- L'oro di Fraus (Editori Riuniti 1988, Il Maestrale 2000)
- Il sale sulla ferita (Marsilio 1990, Il Maestrale 2010), finalist at the Premio Viareggio 1990
- Una ignota compagnia (Feltrinelli 1992, Il Maestrale 2007), finalist at the Premio Viareggio 1992
- La casa della palma (Avagliano 2002)
- Millant'anni (Il Maestrale 2002, 2009)
- Il mare intorno (Sellerio 2003)
- Assandira (Sellerio 2004)
- Alba dei giorni bui (Il Maestrale 2005, 2009), Premio Dessi 2005
- Le fiamme di Toledo (Sellerio 2006), Premio Corrado Alvaro 2006, Premio Mondello 2006
- La pelle intera (Il Maestrale 2007)
- Afa (Sellerio 2008)
- Gabbiani sul Carso (Sellerio 2010)
- Doppio cielo (Il Maestrale 2010)
- Sulla faccia della terra (2015)

== Essays ==
- Ethnic Groups, in Journal of the Europeanists:
- Tre saggi sull'antropologia dell'età coloniale, Flaccovio 1973
- Sa Laurera: Il lavoro contadino in Sardegna, Edes 1976 e Il Maestrale 2005:
- Il sapere della mano: saggi di antroplogia del lavoro, Sellerio 1986
- Pane e formaggio e altre cose di Sardegna, Zonza 2000
- Fare dire sentire. L'identico e il diverso nelle culture, Il Maestrale 2011
- Doing, thinking, saying, in Nature knowledge, Berghahn Books 2004
- On Agro-Pastoral Space in Sardinia, in Fabietti & Salzman (eds.), The Anthropology of Tribal and Peasant Pastoral Societies. Social Cohesion and Fragmentation, 343–350, Como-Pavia, Ibis 1996.

== Miscellaneous ==
- Tempus (CUEC 2008, 2012 audiobook, unabridged, by Giulio Angioni)
- Il dito alzato (Sellerio 2012)
- Oremari (Il Maestrale 2013)

== Bibliography ==
- Abate et al., Cartas de logu: scrittori sardi allo specchio, CUEC 2007.
- A. M. Amendola, L'isola che sorprende. La narrativa sarda in italiano (1974–2006), Cagliari, CUEC 200, 160–179.
- Vinigi L. Grottanelli, Ethnology and/or cultural anthropology in Italy: traditions and development, in "Current Anthropology", XVIII (1977), 593–614.
- E. Hall, Greek tragedy and the politics of subjectivity in recent fiction, "Classical Receptions Journal", 1 (1), 23–42, Oxford University Press, 2009.
- C. Lavinio, Narrare un'isola. Lingua e stile di scrittori sardi, Roma, Bulzoni, 1991, 151–171.
- F. Manai, Cosa succede a Fraus? Sardegna e mondo nel racconto di Giulio Angioni, Cagliari, CUEC, 2006.
- M. Marras, Ecrivains insulaires et auto-représentation, "Europaea", VI, 1–2 (2000), 17–77.
- A. Ottavi, Les romanciers italiens contemporains, Paris, Hachette, 1992, 142–145.
- L. Schröder, Sardinienbilder. Kontinuitäten und Innovationen in der sardischen Literatur und Publizistik der Nachkriegszeit, Bern, Peter Lang, 2000.
- B. Wagner, Sardinien, Insel im Dialog. Texte, Diskurse, Filme, Tübingen, Francke Verlag 2008.
- F. Bachis, A. M. Pusceddu (eds), Cose da prendere sul serio. Le antropologie di Giulio Angioni, Nuoro, Il Maestrale, 2015.

== See also ==
- Sardinian Literary Spring
- Assandira
- Sa Laurera
