= Salvatore Mannuzzu =

Italian writer (1930–2019)

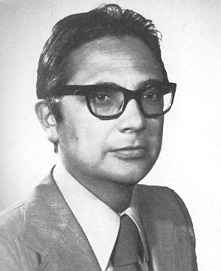
Salvatore Mannuzzu

Salvatore Mannuzzu (7 March 1930 – 10 September 2019) was an Italian writer, politician, and magistrate.

== Life ==
Mannuzzu was born in Pitigliano. He was a magistrate until 1976 and a member of the Italian Parliament until 1987. He is considered, with Giulio Angioni and Sergio Atzeni, to have been one of the initiators of the so-called Sardinian Literary Nouvelle Vague, or Sardinian Literary Spring, the Sardinian narrative in Europe, which followed the work of figures such as Grazia Deledda, Emilio Lussu, Giuseppe Dessì, Gavino Ledda, and Salvatore Satta.

Mannuzzu's most successful novel is Procedura (1988. Einaudi), winner of Italy's Viareggio Prize in 1989. It is a detective story where the nameless narrator is an investigative judge who has to discover Valerio Garau's killer. Garau is an attorney from Sassari in Sardinia, who is poisoned to death while having coffee with his lover. The story unfolds over two years, 1978 and 1979, during a critical period for Italy, marked by a wave of terrorism. In 2000 the director Antonello Grimaldi made the film Un delitto impossibile from this novel, which is also considered (with the coeval L'oro di Fraus by Giulio Angioni), the origin of a genre of Sardinian detective stories (giallo sardo).

== Works ==
- Procedura (novel) 1988
- Un morso di formica (novel) 1989
- La figlia perduta (short stories) 1992
- Le ceneri del Montiferro (novel) 1994
- II terzo suono (novel) 1995
- Corpus (poems) 1997
- Il catalogo (novel) 2000
- Alice (novel) 2001
- Le fate dell'inverno (novel) 2004
- La ragazza perduta (novel) 2011
- Snuff o l'arte di morire (novel) 2013
