= Francesco Remotti =

Francesco Remotti (born 6 June 1943 in Pozzolo Formigaro) is an Italian anthropologist. He is a lecturer and heads the Department of Anthropology at the University of Turin.

== Works ==
- Noi, primitivi. Lo specchio dell’antropologia (Torino 1990)
- Luoghi e corpi (Torino 1993)
- Contro l’identità (Roma-Bari 1996)
- Prima lezione di antropologia (Roma-Bari 2000)
- Centri di potere. Capitali e città nell’Africa precoloniale (Torino 2005)
- L'ossessione identitaria (Roma-Bari 2010)
- Cultura. Dalla complessità all'impoverimento (Roma-Bari 2011)
- Fare umanità. I drammi dell'antropo-poiesi (Roma-Bari 2013)
- Per un'antropologia inattuale (Milano 2014)
- Somiglianze. Una via per la convivenza (Bari-Roma 2019
- (ed.) Sull'identità (Milano 2021)
