= Marcello Fois =

Italian writer

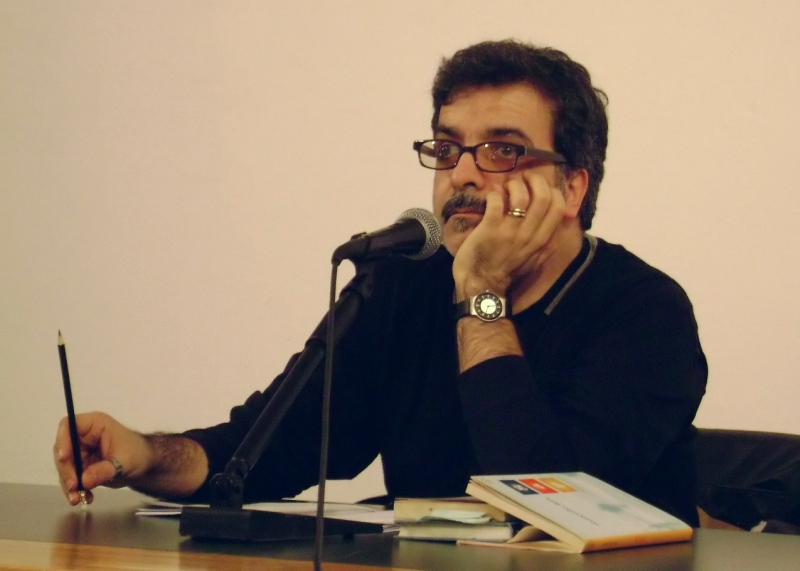

Marcello Fois (born 20 January 1960) is an Italian writer. He was born in Nuoro in Sardinia and studied at the University of Bologna. His first novel Ferro Recente was published in 1989. A prolific author, he has also written scripts for radio, TV, film and theatre. He has won numerous prizes, including:

- 1992 – Premio Italo Calvino for Picta
- 1997 – Premio Dessì for Nulla
- 1998 – Premio Scerbanenco for Sempre caro
- 2002 – Premio Fedeli for Dura madre
- 2007 – Premio Lama e trama
- 2007 – Premio Super Grinzane Cavour for Memoria del vuoto
- 2007 – Premio Volponi for Memoria del vuoto
- 2007 – Premio Alassio Centolibri - Un Autore per l'Europa for Memoria del vuoto
- 2026 – Campiello Prize for L'immensa distrazione

Fois is considered to be a leading proponent of the "New Sardinian Literature" movement.

== Selected works ==
- Sempre caro, 1998 – The Advocate (trans. Patrick Creagh) 2003
- Memoria del vuoto, 2006 – Memory of the Abyss (trans. Patrick Creagh) 2012
- Stirpe, 2009 – Bloodlines (trans. Silvester Mazzarella) 2014
- Nel tempo di mezzo, 2012 – The Time in Between (trans. Silvester Mazzarella) 2018
- Luce perfetta, 2015 – Perfect Light (trans. Silvester Mazzarella) 2020
- Del dirsi addio, 2017 - Valse Triste (trans. Richard Dixon) 2021
