= Sergio Atzeni =

Italian writer

Sergio Atzeni (14 October 1952 in Capoterra – 6 September 1995 in Carloforte) was a Sardinian writer.

== Life and career ==
Born in Capoterra, southern Sardinia, Atzeni lived in Orgosolo during his childhood until he moved to Cagliari where, as a journalist, he worked for some of the most important Sardinian newspapers. He also became a member of the Italian Communist Party, but later left the party, being disillusioned with politics. In 1986, he left Sardinia and travelled across Europe, but in the last part of his life he settled in Turin where he wrote his most important novels, including Il figlio di Bakunìn (Bakunin's Son), Passavamo sulla terra leggeri and Il quinto passo è l'addio. In 1995, he died in Carloforte while swimming in the sea during a holiday back in Sardinia.

All of Atzeni's works are set in Sardinia and were written in Italian. He experimented with different techniques and styles across his novels. Most notably, he used a very original language that fused elegant literary Italian and the "patter" used by the working-class in Cagliari and Sardinia, where many words and sayings are borrowed from the Sardinian language. In this way, Atzeni reproduces the immediacy of the spoken language in his novels. In some of his novels (e.g. Il quinto passo è l'addio and Bellas mariposas) he also used techniques akin to the "magic realism" style of many Southern American authors, where fantastic elements appear in the realistic setting.

Sergio Atzeni is considered, with Giulio Angioni and Salvatore Mannuzzu, one of the initiators of the so-called Sardinian Literary Spring, the Sardinian narrative of today in the European arena, which followed the work of individual prominent figures such as Grazia Deledda, Emilio Lussu, Giuseppe Dessì, Gavino Ledda, Salvatore Satta. Some of his novels have been translated into French, but only one, Bakunin's Son, has been translated into English.

Atzeni died by drowning in the Mediterranean Sea off the coast of San Pietro Island on 6 September 1995.

== Bibliography ==
- Aray Dimoniu (1984)

A short tale inspired by Sardinian traditional tales of demons and magic.

- L'Apologo del giudice bandito (1986) (Apologue of the Bandit Judge)

Set in the year 1492 in Cagliari. Starting from an imaginary trial of the Spanish rulers of Sardinia against the locusts that were spreading famine in Sardinia, several characters are introduced, including the Spanish viceroy, Spanish soldiers and aristocrats, humble Sardinian peasants and drunkards, and finally the Sardinian chief (a "Judge" according to the Sardinian medieval tradition) that gives the name to the novel.

- Il figlio di Bakunin (1991) (Bakunin's Son)

A son tries to find out more about his father: every person interviewed by the son speaks in first person and tells a story about the son's father. The son discovers his father was from a bourgeois family, then became a miner in the 1930s, and a political activist and member of parliament after the war. In this way, the book spans the dramatic changes between the beginning of the 20th century and the 1950s in Sardinia, as experienced and told by the different characters in the book. This book is available in English by Italica Press

- Il quinto passo è l'addio (1995) (The Fifth Step is a Farewell).

This novel is probably the most autobiographical of Atzeni's novels. It tells the story of a man who while on a ferryboat, leaving Sardinia for good, remembers and revokes his past experiences in Cagliari, including an unhappy love story and several frustrations and humiliations caused by the corruption and small-mindedness of politicians and employers.

- Passavamo sulla terra leggeri (1996) (Lightly We Passed on Earth )

This novel was published after Atzeni's death, but Atzeni had submitted it to the publisher before his death. The narrator of the book is asked to preserve the memory of Sardinian history by an old acquaintance and so is told the history of Sardinia, from the mythical origins to the defeat of the independent kingdom of Arborea and the final conquest of Sardinia by the Spaniards in the 15th Century.

- Bellas Mariposas (1996) (Beautiful Butterflies)

This was also published after Atzeni's death, but it was still a work in progress. It is a short story told in a first-person narrative by a young girl from a working-class neighbourhood of Cagliari. The language used borrows many phrases and words from the Sardinian dialect spoken in Cagliari, and even the title of the story itself is in Sardinian.

- Due colori esistono al mondo, il verde è il secondo (1997)

A collection of poetry

- Raccontar fole (1999)

An essay on the misleading representation of Sardinia given by historians and travellers in the 18th and 19th centuries.

- Racconti con colonna sonora (2002 )

A collection of short stories, mainly crime-fiction stories.

- Gli anni della grande peste (2003)

A collection of newspaper articles and short stories published in different magazines.

- I sogni della città bianca (2005)

A collection of short stories written in the early 1980s

- Scritti giornalistici (2005)

A collection of newspaper articles.
