= Salvatore Satta =

Italian jurist and writer

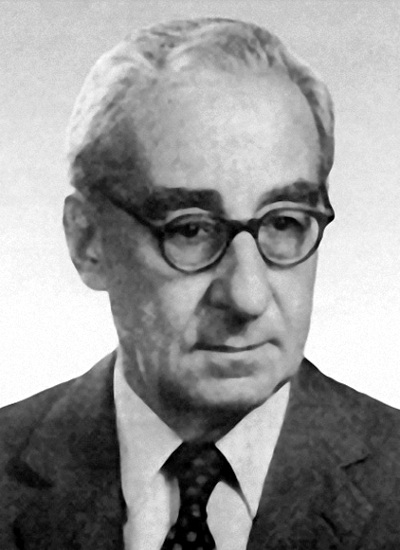
- Photograph of Salvatore Satta
- Born: Salvatore Satta; 9 August 1902; Nuoro, Sardinia, Italy
- Died: 19 April 1975 (aged 72); Rome, Italy
- Education: Liceo ginnasio statale Giorgio Asproni
- Alma mater: University of Sassari
- Occupations: Jurist, writer
- Spouse: Laura Boschian
- Writing career
- Language: Italian
- Notable work: The Day of Judgment

Salvatore Satta (9 August 1902 in Nuoro – 19 April 1975 in Rome) was an Italian jurist and writer. He is famous for the novel The Day of Judgment (orig. Italian: Il giorno del giudizio) (1975), and for several important studies on civil law.

== Biography ==
He was the youngest son of notary Salvatore Satta and Antonietta Galfrè, and relative of Sebastiano Satta. After attending the Liceo classico in Nuoro and Sassari, he graduated in law in 1924 at the University of Sassari. He is considered one of Italy's foremost jurists, in particular for his works on the Italian civil code after the Second World War, and one of the greatest Sardinian authors.

== Bibliography ==
- U. Nicolini, Leggendo il "De profundis" di Salvatore Satta, "Humanitas", IV, 1949.
- F. Martinazzoli, De profundis, "Studi sardi", IX, 1950.
- E. Pera Genzone, Salvatore Satta, "De profundis", "Filosofia", aprile 1981.
- F. Pappalardo La Rosa, Sulla veranda, anime messe a nudo, "L'Umanità", 21 July 1981.
- R. Morabito, La storia senza storia di Salvatore Satta, in Parola e scrittura, Roma, Bulzoni, 1984.
- N. De Giovanni, La scrittura sommersa-Itinerari su Salvatore Satta, Cagliari, Gia Editrice, 1984.
- G. Mameli, Scrittori sardi del Novecento, Cagliari, EdiSar, 1989.
- M. G. Longhi, Elogio del Giorno del giudizio: saggi di analisi testuale, s.l., Edizioni Mare, 1990.
- U. Collu (a cura di), Salvatore Satta giuristascrittore, Atti del Convegno internazionale di Studi "Salvatore Satta giuristascrittore", Nuoro 6–9 aprile 1989, Nuoro, Consorzio per la pubblica lettura "S. Satta", 1990.
- Giulio Angioni, Rileggendo da antropologo 'Il giorno del Giudizio', in U. Collu 1990 (vedi qui sopra), pp. 283–290.
- Cristina Lavinio, Il giorno del giudizio di Salvatore Satta, in Narrare un'isola. Lingua e stile di scrittori sardi, Roma, Bulzoni, 1991, pp. 111–120.
- Cristina Lavinio, L'(auto)ironia ossimorica di un "ridicolo dio", in Id. Narrare un'isola, Roma, Bulzoni, 1991, pp. 121–150.
- B. Bigi, L'autorità della lingua: per una nuova lettura dell'opera di Salvatore Satta, Ravenna, Longo 1994.
- V. Gazzola Stacchini, Come in un giudizio. Vita di Salvatore Satta, Roma, Donzelli, 2002.
- Giovanni Bianco, Crisi dello Stato e del diritto in Salvatore Satta, in Clio, 2003, n.4, pagg.703-715.
- B. Pischedda, "Ora che la terra li copre tutti": S. Satta, Il Giorno del giudzio, in La grande sera del mondo: romanzi apocalittici nell'Italia del benessere, Aragno, Torino 2004, pp. 29–83.
- B. Pischedda, Le agende di Satta, in Mettere giudizio. 25 occasioni di critica militante, Diabasis, Reggio Emilia 2006, pp. 29–33.
- Klaus Lüderssen: Die düstere Poesie des Paradoxen im Recht. Juristen sollten Literatur studieren; Kafka, der Dichter des „Prozesses“ hatte europäische Verwandte in Tadeusz Breza und Salvatore Satta. In: FAZ, Nr. 36 vom 11. Februar 2006, S. 45.
- Maria Schäfer: Studien zur modernen sardischen Literatur. Die Menschen- und Landschaftsdarstellung bei Grazia Deledda, Salvatore Satta, Giuseppe Dessi und Gavino Ledda. Dissertation, Universität Saarbrücken 1986.
- Antonio Delogu, Giuseppe Capograssi tra Salvatore Satta e Antonio Pigliaru in Antonio Delogu e Aldo Maria Morace, a cura di, Esperienza e verità, Il Mulino, 2009;
- Antonio Delogu, Le radici fenomenologico-capograssiane di Satta giurista-scrittore in Salvatore Satta giurista scrittore, Nuoro, Consorzio per la Lettura 'S. Satta', 1990;
- Antonio Delogu, Giudizio e pena in Salvatore Satta in U. Collu, a cura di, Salvatore Satta, oltre il giudizio. Il diritto, il romanzo, la vita, Donzelli, 2005;
- Antonio Delogu, Giustizia e pena in Salvatore Satta in Rivista Internazionale di Filosofia del Diritto, 2007, n.4.
- Cristina Lavinio, Ex ungue leonem. Stimoli didattici dal frammento al testo, in Il giorno del giudizio. Ambiti e modelli di lettura, a cura di M. Masala e V. Serra, Aipsa Edizioni, Cagliari, 2012, pp. 123–135.
- Giulio Angioni, Il luogo del giudizio, in Il dito alzato, Palermo, Sellerio, 2012, pp. 186–191.
- Francesco Casula, Letteratura e civiltà della Sardegna, vol.I, Grafica del Parteolla Editore, Dolianova, 2011, pagg.179–189.
- Simone Marsi, L’essere umano e il suo destino. Sulla «Veranda» di Salvatore Satta, in "Strumenti Critici", a. XXXIII n. 3, settembre-dicembre 2018, pp. 559–573
