= Gavino Ledda =

Italian author & scholar (born 1938)

- Born: 30 December 1938 (age 87); Siligo, Sassari, Sardinia, Italy
- Education: Degree in Linguistics
- Alma mater: Sapienza University of Rome
- Occupations: Writer; Poet
- Writing career
- Language: Sardinian, Italian
- Notable works: Padre padrone, 1975
- Notable awards: Premio Viareggo, 1975

Gavino Ledda (Sardinian: Gavinu 'e Ledda; born 30 December 1938) is an author and a scholar of the Italian language and of Sardinian. He is best known for his autobiographical work Padre Padrone (1975).

== Biography ==
=== Early life ===
Ledda was born in Siligo, in the Province of Sassari, Sardinia, into a poor family of shepherds. Gavino's father made him leave school at the age of six when he was only in the first year of his primary school education. Bursting into the classroom in the middle of a lesson, Ledda's father justified his position by saying that he needed the boy's help for his agricultural work, as Gavino was his eldest son. In scenes that feature in Padre padrone, he went on to say that school was a luxury that poor shepherds could not afford, and demanded that his son be handed over to him. Although primary education had been compulsory in Italy since the Casati Act of 1859, Ledda's father accused the authorities of wanting to make school compulsory while, according to him: "la povertà, quella è obbligatoria" ("poverty, that's compulsory") (quote from Padre padrone).

Having only attended school for a few weeks, Gavino could not yet read or write. His father, to all intents and purposes, had condemned him to illiteracy, in the same way that he had been treated by his own father, who had removed him from school in a similar fashion. Gavino's father promised him that he would be able to study when he was older, taking the elementary school leaving exams — usually taken at the end of five years of primary schooling — as an external candidate.

Ledda's father gradually introduced him to life as a herder, however, his father's teachings were always given with a certain amount of brutality and were often accompanied by beatings. Initially Ledda's father allowed him to live in the village of Siligo together with his mother and his siblings, but he was soon sent to live with the family steading in the isolated Baddevrùstana, in order that he could run it by himself, leaving his father to concentrate on his work in Siligo. Baddevrùstana is only a few kilometres from Siligo, but the only means of transport the family had was a mule, so the journey seemed long to the young Ledda.

Ledda, still a child, had difficulty getting used to living and working alone at Baddevrùstana, and the more intolerant and rebellious he became, the more violent his father's punishments were. On one occasion, for example, Ledda's father tied him behind the mule and dragged him from Siligo to Baddevrùstana. On another occasion, his father chased him with a spiny branch, with which he thrashed him so much that he deformed his son's face. After this punishment, Ledda's father became seriously concerned that he had irreparably damaged his son's health, and his eyes in particular. He took Gavino to Siligo and called a doctor who, despite the explanations put forward by Gavino's parents, realised how the young boy's face was really damaged. The doctor threatened to report Ledda's father if the incident ever reoccurred.

Ledda spent the rest of his childhood and adolescence working under his father in a state of substantial slavery and was often forced to endure excessive amounts of work and stress. During Gavino's adolescent years, his father decided to send the entire family to Baddevrùstana. Gavino's younger brothers also began to work like him.

=== Emancipation ===
Ledda's emancipation from his "padre padrone" (the title of his biographical work has been translated into English as "My Father, My Master") began towards the end of his adolescence when his father allowed him to take his elementary school exams as he had promised. Around the same period, his father's olive grove was destroyed by frost, and so Gavino and his brothers were denied the prospect of inheriting such valuable property.

Ledda began to develop a passion for learning and a dogged determination to free himself from his life as a poor, illiterate shepherd trapped in a backward environment. First, he planned to emigrate to the Netherlands, but this plan failed. In 1958, he joined the army, signing up for the recruit training programme. When he left Sardinia, he barely knew a word of standard Italian - when he did not know how to respond to the orders of a superior officer, he would get by with "Signorsì!" ("Yes, Sir!"). Working and studying day and night, with the help of an officer and of a fellow soldier, Ledda's level of Italian improved considerably. He took his middle school exams as an external candidate, and became a Sergeant Radio Operator at the communications school at Cecchignola, in Rome. In 1962, he left the army and returned to Sardinia to continue his studies.

The fact that Ledda left the army was frowned on by his father and by others in Siligo, who thought that he was overconfident and too ambitious for a boy of his social class, and that he was bound to end up broke. As a sergeant who had passed his middle school exams, he would already have been well respected and admired as a self-made man, but he was already thinking about taking his secondary school exams and then even a university education. Ledda's father argued with him several times, trying to dissuade him from taking his studies further. Nevertheless, he succeeded in passing his middle school exams in 1962. Despite this success, or perhaps because of it, the cruel attitude of the people of Siligo towards Ledda continued.

Eventually, Ledda defied his father openly, claiming his independence. He put across to his father, in no uncertain terms, his world vision, his ideals and his plans, and explained why he no longer wished to be subject to his father's oppression. Thanks to the Bacchelli Law, the Italian government later granted him a life annuity.

=== Studies ===
Ledda obtained the high school diploma in 1964. He then enrolled at the Sapienza University of Rome and in 1969 obtained a degree in Linguistics. In 1970 he was admitted to Accademia della Crusca with Giacomo Devoto and in 1971 he was nominated assistant professor in Cagliari, Sardinia.

== Works ==
- Padre padrone. L'educazione di un pastore (novel, 1975)
- Lingua di falce (novel, 1977)
- Le canne, amiche del mare (tale, 1978)
- Aurum tellus (poems,1991)
- I cimenti dell'agnello (tales and poems, 1995)

In April 1975, Feltrinelli published his masterpiece Padre Padrone (My Father, My Master) based on his own life and completed it in 1974. The book was awarded with the Premio Viareggio and was published in forty languages. Based on the book, in 1977 Paolo and Vittorio Taviani directed Padre padrone (also known as Father and Master) for Italian television, which won the Palme d'Or prize at the 1977 Cannes Film Festival.

Ledda continues to work as a writer publishing other books, novels, tales and poems. In 1984 he also wrote and directed a movie named Ybris.

== Bibliography ==
- Ernesto Ferrero, Il servo pastore all’Università, "La Stampa", 6 juin 1975;
- Tullio De Mauro, Due libri all’interno del linguaggio, «L’Ora», 6 juin 1975;
- Giulio Angioni, Il figlio di Abramo, in Il dito alzato, Palermo, Sellerio, 2012.
- Maria Schäfer: Studien zur modernen sardischen Literatur. Die Menschen- und Landschaftsdarstellung bei Grazia Deledda, Salvatore Satta, Giuseppe Dessi und Gavino Ledda. Dissertation, Universität Saarbrücken 1986;
- Dino Manca, Un caso letterario: Padre Padrone di Gavino Ledda, in D. MANCA, Il tempo e la memoria, Rome, Aracne, 2006, pp. 33–47;
- A. M. Amendola, L'isola che sorprende. La narrativa sarda in italiano (1974 - 2006), Cagliari, 2007 ISBN 88-8467-356-9.
