= Giuseppe Dessì =

Italian writer

Giuseppe Dessì (7 August 1909 – 6 July 1977) was an Italian novelist, short-story writer and playwright from Sardinia. His novel Paese d'ombre won the 1972 Strega Prize and was translated into English as The Forests of Norbio.

Dessì grew up in Villacidro in Sardinia but later moved to Rome.

== Works ==
- Il disertore, Milano: Feltrinelli, 1961. Translated by Virginia Hathaway Moriconi as The deserter, 1962.
- Paese d'ombre: Romanzo, Milan: A. Mondadori, 1972. Translated by Frances Frenaye as The forests of Norbio, New York: Harcourt Brace Jovanovich, 1975.
