= Dialectal variation in Catalan phonology =

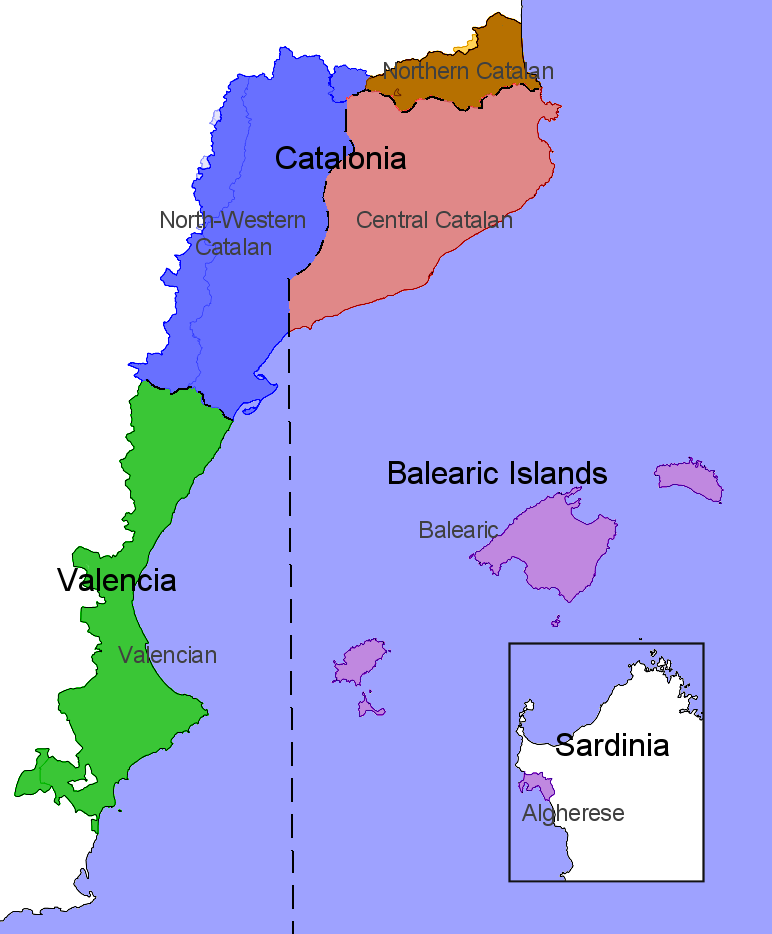
Dialectal Map of Catalan Eastern dialects: Northern Catalan Central Catalan Balearic and Algherese (Alguerese) Western dialects: North-Western Catalan Valencian

Catalan, a pluricentric language, presents a wide range of dialectal variation in its phonology.

The differences in the vocalic systems is the main criteria used to differentiate between the major dialects: Wheeler distinguishes two major dialect groups, western and eastern dialects. Eastern Catalan includes Northern Catalan, Central Catalan, Balearic, and Alguerese. Western dialects include Valencian and North-Western Catalan.

Regarding consonants, betacism, fortition, certain elisions, and fricative–affricate alternations are the most prominent differences between dialects.

== Vowels ==
=== Close vowels /i/ and /u/ ===
The degree of vowel openness is greater than in Spanish realizations and is similar across Central Catalan, Mallorcan, and Valencian. It appears that, consistent with the relatively open realization of mid vowels, the high vowels in Valencian, Mallorcan, and Menorcan are also slightly more open than in the rest of the linguistic domain. A comparison of data regarding vertical and horizontal lip opening for a speaker from Lleida and a Central Catalan speaker suggests that /i/ is somewhat more closed in the Lleida dialect. Meanwhile, /i/ in Northern Catalan is more open than in General Catalan. This observation aligns with the possibility that, given the reduced number of vowel phonemes in Northern Catalan, all vowels in this dialect are more "relaxed" and "imprecise" than their counterparts in other dialects.

In general, the high back vowel is more open in Catalan than in Spanish, and it exhibits a similar degree of openness in Central Catalan, Mallorcan, and Valencian. It appears that, consistent with the relatively open realization of mid vowels, high vowels are slightly more open in Valencian, Mallorcan, and Menorcan than in the rest of the linguistic domain. The realization of /u/ is somewhat closer in the Lleida dialect than in Central Catalan; on the other hand, the vowel is likely more open and centralized in Northern Catalan than in Central Catalan.

=== Close-mid vowels /e/ and /o/ ===
The realization of /e/ in Central Catalan exhibits less oral opening than the corresponding /e/ in Spanish. There are differences in vowel openness across the Catalan linguistic domain. On one hand, it has been observed that /e/ is higher in North-Western Catalan than in Central Catalan. Subsequently, it has been reported a smaller gap between the incisors and a greater horizontal separation of the lips during the production of /e/ in the Lleida dialect compared to Central Catalan; consistent with these observations, a very noticeable closing of the vowel has been noted in the Pallars dialect. On the other hand, /e/ appears less low in Central Catalan than in Mallorcan, Valencian, and Alguerese; it is possible that it is also particularly centralized and retracted in Alguerese. Linguistic Atlas of the Iberian Peninsula (ALPI) transcriptions support the existence of a more open /e/ in Valencian and Balearic than in Central and Northwestern Catalan, but they do not confirm the existence of a less open /e/ in North-Western Catalan compared to Central Catalan. Transcriptions from Diccionari català–valencià–balear (DCVB) indicate a particularly open quality of unstressed /e/ in El Comtat, La Safor, La Marina, and Baix Vinalopó. These differences in quality also apply in unstressed positions.

The realization of /o/ in Central Catalan exhibits less oral openness than the corresponding /o/ in Spanish. Similarly to the case of /e/, the /o/ of North-Western Catalan (Lleida dialect) appears closer than that of Central Catalan, although the ALPI does not record this difference. In turn, Mallorcan, Menorcan, and Valencian varieties show more open realizations of the vowel than Central and Northwestern Catalan. Added to these differences is the particularly close quality of the vowel in those transitional areas between the dialects of Catalonia and Roussillon that still maintain the opposition between /o/ and /ɔ/.

=== Mid central vowel /ə/ ===
The central mid vowel (both stressed and unstressed) is slightly closer and more rounded [ɵ] in Mallorcan than in Central Catalan. An intensification of this articulatory characteristic can perhaps be observed in the rounded realization of the stressed variant in towns such as Capdepera, Artà, and Son Servera, regardless of the context.

=== Open-mid vowels /ɛ/ and /ɔ/ ===
==== Open-mid front unrounded vowel /ɛ/ ====
There are three variants of /ɛ/ within the Catalan linguistic domain, based on the degree of oral aperture.

One variant is found in Central Catalan and the Lleida dialect, with a degree of openness greater than that of the most open variant of /e/ in Spanish; the realization in the Lleida dialect is slightly closer than the realization in Barcelona.

A second variant is closer than the previous one, found in Pallars and Alguerese.

A third variant is more open than in Central Catalan, and is found in the southern zones of North-Western Catalan, in Valencian—especially south of Camp de Llíria and l'Horta—and in Balearic Catalan (at least in the Mallorcan and Menorcan varieties). Data from the ALPI indicate that the Valencian realization tends to be slightly more open than that of the Ibizan (Eivissan), Menorcan, and Mallorcan varieties (the latter in the majority of towns). In some regions (Lower Aragon; La Canyada de Biar; Ports), the particularly open nature of the stressed /ɛ/ has fostered a phenomenon of bimatization—resulting in [e̯ɛ], [e̯æ], or [e̯a]—especially before opening consonants (implosive /r/ and /l/) and in vernacular words. A subsequent process of dissimilation between the two resulting elements generates the diphthongs [jɛ], [jæ], and [ja] (e.g., viard, pial for verd, pèl); indeed, in specific cases, the bimatized solution remains the exclusive form or alternates with [jV]-type diphthongs. The diphthongized realization has extended to unstressed positions in some areas (Lower Aragon, La Canyada de Biar).

==== Open-mid back rounded vowel /ɔ/ ====
There are three variants of /ɔ/ based on the degree of oral aperture.

A variant more open than the open variant of /o/ in Spanish, found in Central Catalan and Lleida Catalan.

A variant more closed than the previous one, found in North-Western Catalan and Algherese.

Another variant is more open than the Central Catalan one, and is found in Valencian and Balearic (especially in Mallorcan and Menorcan, more so than in Ibizan (Eivissan)). The very open realization of /ɔ/ in Valencian and Balearic fosters other realizations: [ɒ], [ɑ] (frequent in Artà, Campos, Son Servera, Felanitx, Llucmajor, Sineu, and the Valls del Vinalopó); and cases of diphthongization ([o̯ɔ] in La Sorollera). In Felanitx, the particularly open realization of /ɔ/ may have been favored by the fact that /a/ is produced there with a particularly palatal realization; this explanation could also apply to the pronunciation of /ɔ/ in other localities (Son Servera, Sineu, Campos). Also noteworthy is the particularly closed quality of the vowel in the transition zone between the northern dialects of Catalonia and Northern Catalan areas that still maintain the opposition between /ɔ/ and /o/.

=== Open vowel /a/ ===
There are four variants of /a/ across the linguistic domain:

One variant in found in Central Catalan, Lleida Catalan, and Algherese, which is more open and back (somewhat close to [ɑ]) than the General Spanish /a/.

A variant that is closer and more fronted ([ä] or [ɐ]) than the first variant, is found in Valencian and in North-Western Catalan—both the western sub-dialect (Ribagorçan); the lower Aragon border, and the southern sub-dialect.

A variant that is even closer and more fronted than [æ] or [a], depending on the locality, particularly in Mallorcan and Menorcan; conversely, the Ibizan (Eivissan) pronunciation appears to align more closely with the first variant of Central Catalan. Consistent with these articulatory descriptions, the spectrum of [a] in Mallorcan shows a lower F1 than that of the [a] found in Central Catalan.

A variant that is less open and more centralized than the /a/ of General Catalan, found in Northern Catalan in Roussillon. This realization is produced with less vertical and horizontal lip separation than the realization found in the other dialects.

The particularly close and fronted nature of the stressed /a/ has fostered instances of bimatization or diphthongization in certain areas: [e̯ɑ] and [e̯æ] in Son Servera; [jɛ] following a palatal consonant in Son Servera; and occasionally [jɛ], [jæ], and [ja] in fronting contexts in Lower Aragon. Conversely, various sociolinguistic factors have recently led to realizations of /a/ that are less fronted in certain Mallorcan centers—such as Son Servera, Felanitx, and perhaps even Palma—suggesting a possible ongoing process of change.

== Consonants ==
=== Sonorants ===
==== Nasals /m/, /n/, /ɲ/, /ŋ/ ====
/m/ presents different pronunciations depending on its position.

/m/ before plosive: in Mallorcan, Menorcan, and Alguerese exhibits regressive assimilation of place of articulation—a process that is also quite systematic in colloquial Valencian—whereas in transitional Northern–Central Catalan, does not appear to be regressive assimilation of place when the consonant cluster involves a nasal.

/m/ before nasal: the cluster /mn/ can become [nː] through a process of regressive assimilation in the southern part of the Valencian Community (e.g., columna 'column') and in southern Northwestern Catalan (e.g., co[n] no for com no 'of course'; Lower Aragon). The geminate cluster /mm/—when not occurring in a prefixed word—is often simplified in colloquial speech ([m] instead of [mː] in words like gemma 'gem' or súmmum 'height', 'peak'), likely due to the influence of Spanish. In Northern Catalan, by contrast, French words spelled with ⟨mm⟩ have been adopted with [mː] (e.g., Fr. programme).

/m/ before fricative and approximant: in Mallorcan, Menorcan, and Alguerese generally exhibits regressive assimilation of place; such assimilations are also quite common in colloquial Valencian. Consequently, the word-final cluster -ms becomes -ns. In colloquial speech, the medial intervocalic cluster /ms/ can become [ns] through regressive assimilation in many areas of the linguistic domain (e.g., *prensa instead of premsa 'press').

/m/ before rhotics: in word-internal position, pronunciations such as *sonriure (alongside somriure 'smile'; cf. Lower Aragon) have arisen through assimilation and/or Spanish influence.

/m/ before lateral: regressive assimilation of /ml/ to [nl] occurs in various dialects in colloquial speech (Lower Aragon). Assimilations of manner are less systematic: in Mallorcan, regressive assimilation of /ml/ to [lː] may occur, while in Alguerese, progressive assimilation of /ml/ to [n(ː)] takes place.

/m/ in postconsonantal position: the consonant /m/ retains its bilabial realization following any consonant. In the Alicante dialect, the word-final cluster -rm may simplify to -r due to the articulatory weakening of the second consonant (C2) in this context.

/n/ presents different pronunciations depending on its position.

/n/ before plosive: the process of regressive assimilation in optional cases is possibly more frequent than when C1 is an oral dental plosive.

/n/ before nasal: before /ɲ/, the palatalization of /n/ is obligatory throughout the entire linguistic domain, except, perhaps, in those territories where the high degree of palatal quality in /ɲ/ results in [ɲː] being the only possible realization. Optional assimilations are more frequent here than in the case of clusters consisting of an oral stop followed by a nasal stop; for instance, the contact between a prefix-final /n/ and a root-initial /m/ is invariably resolved as [mː] (e.g., immortal 'immortal', commiseració 'commiseration'), although [nm] pronunciations have been recorded in areas bordering the Aragonese-speaking region (e.g., *inmemorial 'immemorial' in Lower Aragon, *inmens 'huge' in Lower Cinca). The geminate cluster /nn/ that does not arise from prefixation (e.g., innovar 'innovate', connatural 'connatural') is often simplified in colloquial speech ([n] instead of [nː] in words like bienni 'biennial', tarannà 'mindset', Anna 'Anne'), likely due to the influence of Spanish.

/n/ before fricative: partial regressive assimilation of place before a palatal C2 is mandatory everywhere, except perhaps in those territories where the high degree of palatal quality of the palatal consonants makes C1 = [ɲ] the only possible outcome. In word-internal position, the realizations [nf] have been recorded with high frequency near the Aragonese domain (fanfarró 'boaster' in Lower Cinca; enfilar 'to threat', 'to string' in Llitera) and [nv] in the Alicante dialect (canvi or cànvit). Occasionally, the cluster with a labiodental C2 simplifies to just C2 (*acovidar < convidar 'to invite' in Tortosan; *botifló < botinfló 'fat person' in Mallorcan, Empordà). Simplification of the word-final -ns cluster may also occur—often due to frequent usage or analogy—resulting in -s: *us < uns 'some' in Alicante; *dos < doncs 'then' in Upper Empordà; *tes < tens 'you have' in Pallars; ges < gens 'nothing' in North Catalonia).

/n/ before approximant, in a heterosyllabic cluster: in this context, /nj/ is realized as [ɲi] throughout the linguistic domain, alongside [(i̯)j] in Mallorcan and—if the word is of frequent use—in other dialects (Valencian, Ibizan (Eivissan)); in a isosyllabic cluster: the realization of the consonant /n/ is less palatalized in this context than before a heterosyllabic C2 = [j]. Nevertheless, the evolution [nj] > [ɲ] has been quite systematic in varieties where palatal consonants are articulated with a high degree of palatalization. Most examples are found in the north of the Valencian region (senya 'noria', 'sakia'; monyato 'sweet potato' instead of sénia, moniato), in North-Western Catalan (*nyaler < nialer 'egg left for hens to lay it; Ribagorçan, *asberginya < albergínia 'aubergine'; in Pallars), and in Northern Catalan (panyer [Fr. panier], jardinyera [Fr. jardinière]). In the western domain, as well as in Northern and Alguerese, there are examples of palatalization in frequently used words involving contact ([ɲa] instead of *n'hi ha* 'there is', and even the corresponding infinitive nyaure, haver-hi). This process is quite common in other languages and can be characterized as follows: the palatalization of apico-alveolar consonants gives rise to a dorso-alveolopalatal articulation and primarily affects nasal consonants preceding [j].

/n/ before rhotics or laterals: partial regressive assimilation of place before a palatal lateral is obligatory, and it must be total ([ɲʎ]) in regions where palatal consonants are produced with a high degree of palatalization. Regarding the manner of articulation, clusters with a lateral C2 may be realized with a nasalized lateral C1. In specific dialects, the regressive assimilation /nl/ > [lː] (Mallorcan) and the progressive assimilations /nl/ > [n(ː)] and /nʎ/ > [ɲ(ː)] (Alguerese; *qui[ɲː]amp, quin llamp 'what a lightning bolt', in colloquial Valencian) are also optional; these assimilations tend to occur primarily when the second word is a high-frequency grammatical form (e.g., an article).

/n/ in postconsonantal position: in this position, /n/ remains apico-alveolar, except in some cases:

- After a dental stop, the articulation of /n/ is often dental; after /ɲ/, the consonant /n/ is typically produced with lamino-alveolar contact. Simplification of the /mn/ cluster to [m] is possible; thus, somniar ('to dream') becomes *somiar in colloquial speech throughout the linguistic domain.

/ɲ/ presents different pronunciations depending on its position.

/ɲ/ before plosive and nasal: in Mallorcan, the palatal nasal /ɲ/ (C1) undergoes depalatalization before a plosive consonant (C2); the result of this process is a consonant cluster consisting of [n] (C1a) and a following nasal consonant (C1b) assimilated to the place of articulation of the plosive consonant (C2). This same process occurs, to a greater or lesser extent, among speakers in areas where the consonant exhibits a low degree of palatalization—whether due to the influence of Spanish or other factors (such as in the Barcelona dialect). In Alguerese, /ɲ/ undergoes a depalatalization process resulting in a single consonant assimilated to the place of articulation of the following plosive (a phenomenon also found in parts of Central Catalan; e.g., *l'a[m] passat for l'any passat 'last year'). This dialectal distribution suggests that /ɲ/ is less palatal in Balearic and Alguerese than in other dialects within the linguistic domain.

/ɲ/ before fricative and approximant: in general (Central Catalan), /ɲ/ undergoes depalatalization before an alveolar fricative, consistent with the fricative's high degree of coarticulatory resistance. This process presumably does not occur in areas where /ɲ/ is produced with a high degree of palatalization.

/ɲ/ before liquid: analogous to what occurs before an alveolar fricative, regressive depalatalization of /ɲ/ may take place before [l] and [r], consistent with the high degree of coarticulatory resistance of both alveolar liquid consonants in Catalan (Central Catalan). This process likely does not occur in areas where /ɲ/ is produced with a high degree of palatalization. Regarding the manner of articulation, optional regressive assimilation of laterality occurs in certain zones of the linguistic domain (Mallorcan, Menorcan).

/ɲ/ in postconsonantal position: the consonant /ɲ/ is realized as dorso-alveolopalatal following any consonant.

The velar nasal stop realization ([ŋ]) is produced with a complete dorsal occlusion: in the velar zone before a back vowel, and in the mid-to-posterior palatal zone before a front vowel. The occlusion phase is shorter than for /m/ and /n/. The murmur spectrum exhibits: (a) a low F1 (around 250 Hz); (b) a high antiresonance (above 3000 Hz), inversely associated with the reduced volume of the oral cavity located behind the point of occlusion; and (c) F2 and F3 values at frequencies similar to those of /n/. The voiced occlusion is followed by a barely audible oral release, especially in absolute phrase-final position. The F2 and F3 vowel transitions are similar to those of /ɡ/.

==== Laterals /l/, /ʎ/ ====
There is varying degrees of l-velarization among dialects: /l/ is dark irrespective of position in Balearic and Central Catalan and might tend to vocalization in some cases. In Western varieties like Valencian, this dark l contrasts with a clear l (with [ɫ] ocurring in final position, before nasal or a stressed vowel, and [l] in the rest of cases). While in other dialects, like Alguerese or Northern Catalan, /l/ is never velarized in any instance.

Iodització: Delateralization of /ʎ/ (also known as iesme històric "historic yeísmo") in regular speech in most of Mallorcan, Northern Catalan and in the historic comarca of Vallès (Barcelona), Latin-derived words that had intervocalic /l/ + yod (-li-, -le-) or velar + /l/ (-cvl-, -gvl-) developed [j] (e.g., palla [ˈpajə] 'straw') from Latin palea), rather than /ʎ/ as in the majority of other regions. Accents with traditional ieisme use /ʎ/ only in words where this sound developed from Latin initial l- (as in lluna [ˈʎunə] 'moon') or intervocalic -ll- (as in ella [ˈeʎə] 'she').

==== Rhotics /r/, /ɾ/ ====
Elision of the final /ɾ/ in Eastern Catalan dialects. In Central Catalan, this always occurs in verbs (e.g., donar la mà [duˈnä ɫə ˈmä] 'to shake hands'), except when they are combined with a weak pronoun (e.g., donar-la [duˈnäɾ.ɫə] 'to shake it'). In nouns and adjectives, there are words in which Central Catalan retains the final /ɾ/ and others in which it is omitted. For example, it is retained in some monosyllables; (Note: Examples: bar, per, cor, car, or, mor, pur, tir, mar, par, bar (but not in por, flor and dur).) in some adjectives that sometimes become nouns; (Note: Examples: futur, familiar, militar, titular, particular, espectacular, escolar, superior, inferior, anterior, exterior, posterior, popular, espectacular, cel·lular, angular, similar (but not in pastor, jugador, actor, autor, treballador, espectador, doctor, defensor, seguidor, senyor, missatger, millor, pitjor, etc.).) in some nouns; (Note: Examples: amor, favor, honor, valor, vapor, humor, terror, motor, sabor, cigar, papir, safir, quefir, albir, emir, vampir, tumor (but not in color, dolor, olor, carrer, plaer, calor, paladar, etc.)) in some nouns derived from verbs; (Note: Examples: sospir, respir, atur, enyor, poder (but not in esmorzar, dinar, berenar, sopar, saber, benestar).) and in some new nouns and loanwords. (Note: Examples: radar, funicular (but not in televisor and ascensor).) In the word pudor the final /ɾ/ is pronounced when it means "modesty" (el pudor) and is elided when it means "stink" (la pudor). On the other hand, in Balearic Catalan, the elision of the final /ɾ/ in nouns and adjectives is much more common. In Valencian, the final /ɾ/ is usually retained in all types of words (although there are exceptions).

Generally, the /ɾ/ in prendre and other derived words (aprendre, comprendre) is not pronounced in any dialect.

=== Obstruents ===
==== Plosives ====
===== Voiced plosives /b/, /d/, /ɡ/ =====
Spirantization (weakening) of /b, d, g/ → [β, ð, ɣ]. In all Catalan dialects, as in the other peninsular languages and Gascon, the series of sonorous plosives are articulated as approximants in a series of contexts:

- In intervocalic position: aca[β]ar (acabar) 'to finish', la [ð]ona (la dona) 'the woman', la [ɣ]ata (la gata) 'the cat', [f.]. Regarding intervocalic [ð] (< /d/), it is well known that Valencian tends to elide it—primarily the [ð] in the suffix -ada and, to a more limited extent, in -ador: vegada > veg[ɑː] ('time, occasion'), menjada > menj[aː] ('eating, meal'), llaurador > llauraor ('plowman'), mocador > mocaor ('tissue'), etc. Other words where the [ð] may be omitted include, for example, ca([ð])ira ('chair'), serra([ð])ura ('saw cut', 'sawdust'), or ma([ð])ur ('mature'). In Southern Valencian (especially in the Camp d'Elx area and its surroundings), almost any intervocalic [ð] can be elided: Na([ð])al ('Christmas'), co([ð])ony ('quince'), ca([ð])ena ('chain'), etc.
- After /ɾ/, /s/, /z/, and */l/: el [β]es, el bes, 'the kiss', per[ð]ona, perdona, 'sorry', els [ɣ]ats, els gats, 'the cats' [pl.]. After /l/, the phoneme /d/ remains a plosive: Al[d]aia, not *Al[ð]aia ('Aldaia').

In a large part of the Valencian-speaking area, the phoneme /ɡ/ almost always appears with its approximant realization [ɣ] rather than the plosive [ɡ], even after a pause: gat > [ˈɣät]. The plosive articulation in these dialects appears only after a nasal: angoixa > [ɑŋˈgojʃɐ].

===== Voiceless plosives /p/, /t/, /k/ =====
Voicing of /p, t, k/ → [β/b, ð, ɣ]. In many Valencian dialects, the series of voiceless plosives are realized as voiced approximants in word-final position when followed by a word beginning with a vowel: ca[b] estret (cap estret 'narrow head'), to[ð] açò (tot açò 'all this'), po[ɣ] alt (poc alt 'not very tall'). This voicing occurs in parts of the Castelló dialect area (Vila-real, Castelló) and in the inland zone of the North-Southern dialect. This pattern of voicing is entirely legitimate and valid in Standard Valencian.

Elision of /t/ in the final clusters /lt/ and /nt/ → [l] and [n]: mol(t), pensan(t). This is a traditional phenomenon in all dialects of Catalonia, as well as in Northern Valencian and the Castelló dialect. Elision also occurs in inland areas of Southern Valencian. The loss of /t/—parallel to that of /p/ (as in camp 'field')—is a feature spreading across the Valencian regions. It is observed that the loss of plosives in this context is a recent development in border areas, particularly in the southern part of La Costera and the Plana de Castelló (Nules).

==== Stridents ====
===== Voiced sibilants /ʒ/, /z/, /d͡ʒ/, /d͡z/ =====
The realization [ʒ] is characteristic of Central, Balearic, and Northern Catalan. The exceptions outlined below must be noted. The genuine realization in the speech of the Camp de Tarragona region is [d͡ʒ]. This affricate variant likely also predominates in the Conca de Barberà and in other areas of the Eastern Catalan domain bordering North-Western Catalan. The affricate realization [d͡ʒ] (instead of [ʒ]) is frequent in Central Catalan (Barceloní) and Balearic, especially among young speakers, in emphatic pronunciation, and at the absolute beginning of a sentence. The fricative realization is quite systematic in Northern Catalan and Ibizan (Eivissan) Catalan. In this case, the affrication cannot be attributed to the influence of Spanish (which lacks voiced affricates) but rather to an indigenous tendency toward consonantal strengthening in the most appropriate contexts. The realization [d͡ʒ] is characteristic of North-Western, Alguerese, and Valencian Catalan. Exceptions must be made for those locations where /ʒ/ exhibits fricative realizations ([ʒ]; see the following paragraph) or [tʃ]. In Northwestern Catalan, [ʒ] is the most authentic pronunciation in the Lleida area, Lower Aragon, Noguera, and Terra Alta; it is also quite widespread—alongside [d͡ʒ]—in Pallars, Andorra, Alt Urgell, the Matarranya basin, and other regions. In emphatic pronunciation, the aforementioned areas typically exhibit the affricate articulation. Northern Valencian (Ports, the Maestrat area and basin, Alcalatén, and northern Plana Alta; Guirau, 1979) predominantly records the realization [d͡ʒ], although it sometimes alternates with [ʒ]. On the other hand, colloquial Valencian shows a tendency toward the de-palatalization and loss of friction of the affricate. The geographical distribution of [ʒ] and [d͡ʒ] (/ʒ/) largely coincides with that of [ʃ] and [t͡ʃ] (/ʃ/). Consequently, the diachronic and synchronic factors that drove this distribution must be quite similar for both the voiced and voiceless counterparts. Alguerese has remained faithful to the realization found in medieval Catalan. The [t͡ʃ] realization is characteristic of the apitxat domain. In Northwestern Catalan, the [t͡ʃ] realization is found in the extreme western area of Lower Aragon (La Ginebrosa, La Torre Velilla, La Codonyera, Valljunquera, La Fresneda), Fraga, Maella, La Llitera (Tamarit, Sant Esteve, Peralta), Baixa Ribagorça, and villages in Alta Ribagorça. As explained below, in this latter region, there is no overlap between the localities that devoice /ʒ/ and those that devoice /z/: /ʒ/ is devoiced ([t͡ʃ]) in Benasc, Vilaller, Bonansa, Castelló de Sos, Les Paüls, Castanesa, Pont de Suert, Sopeira, Ribera de Cornudella, and Espés (Areny and the Boí Valley distinguish between [t͡ʃ] and [d͡ʒ]); /z/ is devoiced ([s]) in the northeastern villages of Benasc, Castelló de Sos, Espés, Les Paüls, and Bissaürri (Vilaller, Bonansa, Castanesa, Pont de Suert, Sopeira, Ribera de Cornudella, Areny, and the Boí Valley distinguish between /s/ and /z/). In Valencian, the apitxat area encompasses the entirety of Camp de Morvedre, Camp de Túria, and Horta de València. In the southern and northwestern reaches of the Plana Baixa, Almenara, Onda, Tales, Suera, Aín, Veo, and Betxí also exhibit apitxament (devoicing of the voiced palatal affricate and the voiced alveolar fricative); in this zone, the devoicing of the [d͡ʒ] sound likely dates to the present century and encompasses locations (north of Almenara) where the contrast between /s/ and /z/ still exists. In the northwestern Ribera Baixa, Albalat, Almussafes, and Sollana devoice the palatal affricate and /z/; further south within the same region, there is progressive devoicing of [dʒ] (and, to a lesser extent, of /z/) in Polinyà and Corbera. In the Ribera Alta, the voiced palatal affricate and the voiced alveolar fricative undergo devoicing everywhere, except in Alfarb and Catadau (in the north), Algemesí (in the southeast), and Antella, Gavarda, Carcaixent, and more southerly towns (in the south); however, in some of these latter towns, a process of progressive devoicing of the affricate (though not of /z/) has been observed (the Alcalans valley—Alfarb, Catadau, Llombai; Algemesí). Finally, the affricate is also devoiced in some areas of the Valencian Community located further away from the central districts: Gandia (Safor), where /z/ also becomes [s]; Petrer (Valls del Vinalopó), among young speakers, who also devoice /z/ due to the influence of Spanish; the Carxe Highlands, east of the Vinalopó Valleys, where /z/ appears to remain voiced; and Forcall (Ports) and Vilafranca del Maestrat (Alt Maestrat), where /z/ also does not undergo apitxament (devoicing). The data reported in this section suggest that the phenomenon of apitxament in Catalan-speaking areas occurs through two processes: A simultaneous apitxament process affecting both the voiced palatal affricate and the voiced alveolar fricative. In these circumstances, the double change is attributable to the influence of Spanish pronunciation. It occurs in towns bordering Spanish-speaking territories (Petrer) and among speakers in both urban centers (Barcelona) and rural areas (La Safor).

A successive apitxament process affecting both consonants—that is, the prior devoicing of the voiced palatal affricate followed by the subsequent devoicing of the voiced alveolar fricative. This change is recent and occurs primarily in towns bordering the apitxat region and in other parts of the Valencian-speaking area. In this case, the geographical extent of areas devoicing the palatal affricate exceeds that of areas exhibiting apitxament of the alveolar fricative. This is likely an indigenous process, although some argue for a Spanish or Aragonese origin for the change. In the absence of relevant research, it must be assumed that the factors motivating the change do not coincide with those that drove the devoicing of post-tonic /dʒ/ in other dialectal zones, given that the affricate is produced with a simple stop in the entire—or the vast majority of the—apitxat domain (Valencian apitxat). Rather, it seems necessary to associate the devoicing process with the high degree of palatalization of the palatal consonants and with the considerable articulatory demands involved in forming the occlusion and/or constriction during the production of affricate and/or fricative consonants. It is possible that production mechanisms of this type motivated an increase in intraoral pressure and the cessation of vocal cord vibration. According to this hypothesis, the devoicing of palatal and alveolar affricates would have begun with the stop element in areas where plosives are particularly "tense," subsequently spreading to the following fricative phase; the validity of this explanation appears to be supported by the fact that alveolar fricatives do not always undergo devoicing in the same locations where the corresponding affricates do.

The total loss of friction in initial [ʒ] has fostered a [j] realization in certain frequently used lexical forms. The variant [j]o (instead of [ʒ]o 'I') is characteristic, above all, of the southern regions of Catalonia (including Camp de Tarragona, La Segarra, and Les Garrigues), as well as Valencian, Alguerese, and Ibizan (Eivissan) varieties. The variant [j]a (instead of [ʒ]a 'already') exhibits a similar geographical distribution. A tendency to de-fricativize initial [ʒ] into [j] should also be noted in modern Mallorcan ([j]aume instead of [ʒ]aume 'Jaume', among young speakers).

Final /d͡ʒ/ is realized as [tʃ] in General Catalan (e.g., bo[tʃ] 'crazy'). However, the realization is [i] in Pallaresan, as well as in Ribagorçan, Lliteran, and Maellan (e.g., roi 'red', mai 'May', gai 'jay' for roig, maig, gaig). In Northern Catalan, the [i] realization is characteristic of certain etymological groups (e.g., fui 'he/she flees', rai 'ray') but not others (e.g., maig 'May', boig 'crazy'). Furthermore, certain verb forms (e.g., haig 'I have', vaig 'I go', faig 'I do', veig 'I see') have simplified the affricate to [i] across much of the linguistic domain (Northern Catalan, North-Western Catalan, Central Catalan, Southern Valencian), likely originating from realizations of word-final [tʃ] before a word-initial consonant.

===== Voiceless sibilants /ʃ/, /s/, /t͡ʃ/, /t͡s/ =====
The realization [ʃ] is characteristic of Central Catalan, Balearic, and Northern Catalan. The following exceptions must be noted. In the southern regions of the Central dialectal domain, the realization is [t͡ʃ] instead of [ʃ]. Thus, [t͡ʃ] is general in almost all towns in the Camp de Tarragona region, although some words exhibit [ʃ]/[əi̯ʃ] (e.g., xafogor 'sweltering heat'). The affricate realization is also likely quite widespread in parts of the Conca region (the ALPI transcribes xinxa 'bedbug' with [t͡ʃ] in Vimbodí) and in other districts bordering the North-Western dialectal domain. In many of these territories, the affricate solution is likely in decline in favor of [ʃ], due to prestige factors. In Central Catalan and Balearic (though not in Northern Catalan or Ibizan (Eivissan)), there is an alternation between [ʃ] (especially in colloquial speech) and [t͡ʃ] (especially in emphatic speech and at the absolute beginning of a sentence). Furthermore, the realization [ʃ] at the absolute beginning of a word or sentence has been replaced by [t͡ʃ] among young speakers in urban areas; this change is likely attributable to the influence of Spanish, it has primarily affected words with a Spanish equivalent) or to an indigenous tendency toward the affrication of palatal fricatives in appropriate contexts.

The realization [t͡ʃ] is characteristic of North-Western Catalan, Alguerese, and Valencian. Exceptions must be noted here as well. In North-Western Catalan, some words are pronounced with [ʃ] in specific geographical areas; This is the case with xàfec 'downpour', xollar 'to shear', etc., in the Pallars dialect, and xinxa 'bedbug' in localities within Alt Urgell (ALPI). The fact that the examples of [ʃ] come from Pyrenean villages aligns with the observation that palatal consonants in that area exhibit a lower degree of palatalization than in the central-southern territories of the Northwestern dialect. In Valencian, there are areas where [tʃ] is not the predominant realization. The genuine realization is [ei̯s] in Castelló de la Plana (due to the interpretation of the palatal consonant as an alveolar one) and [(ai̯)ʃ] in Southern Valencian (with a realization of [i] in places where the approximant off-glide appears in an intervocalic position); the realization [tʃ] also appears in certain words across both geographical areas. This geographical distribution of realizations demonstrates, once again, the existence of phonetic similarities between the Alacantí and Central Catalan dialects. Throughout the Valencian dialectal domain, [ʃ] appears in a small number of words, many of which are not of Latin origin (xaloc 'south-east', 'sirocco', Xixona 'Xixona', Xàtiva 'Xàtiva', xarop 'syrup', xàrcia 'net', xeringa 'syringe', xeixa 'common wheat', Xúquer 'Xúquer', Xàbia 'Xàbia', xàvega 'trawler'). Algherese also features words with an initial [ʃ] (xarop 'syrup', xàvega 'trawler', xacal 'jackal', xaloc 'south-east', 'sirocco', xalet 'chalet') alongside a majority of forms with an initial affricate (xinxa 'bedbug', xapa 'plate', 'sheet', xicoira 'common chicory', xaveta 'cotter pin', 'split pin', xeringa 'syringe', xarrar 'to chat', xocolata 'chocolate').

The dialectal contrast between the affricate and fricative realizations stems from various factors. While the affricate realization was likely quite widespread in Old Catalan, the fricative variant is more recent and originated through a process of de-affrication; consequently, Western dialects have proven more conservative than Eastern ones. It is plausible that these dialectal differences are related to varying degrees of palatalization or articulatory "tension" across different speech varieties; following this line of reasoning, the affricate realization would have been preserved in dialects where the degree of palatalization of palatal consonants is high or where plosive affricates are produced with strong "tension." The process of affrication in Eastern dialects is recent and sociolinguistic in nature.

It is realized as [i̯ʃ] or [J], following the same geographical distribution noted for the intervocalic position. In Northern Catalan (excluding Upper Cerdanya), word-final post-tonic [i̯ʃ] becomes [i] in certain etymological groups; thus, we find *mate[i] 'same', *pe[i] 'fish', *fe[i] 'bundle', 'beam'; mateix, peix, feix), but bo[(i̯)ʃ] 'box tree', co[(i̯)ʃ] 'lame', 'wobbly', flu[(i̯)ʃ] 'loose', 'weak' (boix, coix, fluix). It is plausible that this evolution originated from the contact between a word-final [(i̯)ʃ] and the initial consonant of the following word. However, one cannot overlook the possibility that—analogous to other evolutionary developments—this change might be explained by the weakening of a palatal consonant with a low degree of palatalization.

Central Valencian words like mig ('half') and lleig ('ugly') have been transcribed with [t͡s] rather than the expected [t͡ʃ], and Southern Valencian /t͡ʃ/ "has been reported to undergo depalatalization without merging with [t͡s]", as in passets ('small steps') vs. passeig ('stroll', 'avenue').

In Northern Valencia and Southern Catalonia /s/ has merged with realizations of /ʃ/ after a high front vocoid; e.g. terrissa [teˈriʃɐ] ('pottery'), insistisc [ɪnsɪʃˈtiʃk] ('I insist') vs. pixar [pɪˈʃä(ɾ)] ('to pee'), deixar [de(j)ˈʃä(ɾ)] ('to leave', 'to let'). In these varieties /ʃ/ is not found after other voiced consonants, and merges with /t͡ʃ/ after consonants; e.g. punxa [ˈpuɲt͡ʃɐ] ('thorn').

In some Valencian dialects (e.g., Northern Valencian), /s/ and /ʃ/ are auditorily similar such that neutralization may occur in the future. That is the case of Northern Valencian where /ʃ/ is pronounced [js̠] as in caixa ('box').

== See also ==
- Catalan phonology
  - Catalan vowel harmony
  - Stress and vowel reduction in Catalan

== Bibliography ==
- Recasens Vives, Daniel (1996) [1991], Fonètica descriptiva del català: assaig de caracterització de la pronúncia del vocalisme i el consonantisme català al segle XX, Biblioteca Filològica (in Catalan), vol. 21 (2nd ed.), Barcelona, Spain: Institut d'Estudis Catalans, ISBN 978-84-7283-312-8
- Recasens Vives, Daniel; Espinosa, Aina (2005), "Articulatory, positional and coarticulatory characteristics for clear /l/ and dark /l/: evidence from two Catalan dialects" (PDF), Journal of the International Phonetic Association, 35 (1): 1–25, doi:10.1017/S0025100305001878, S2CID 14140079
- Recasens Vives, Daniel; Espinosa, Aina (2007), "An Electropalatographic and Acoustic Study of Affricates and Fricatives in Two Catalan Dialects" (PDF), Journal of the International Phonetic Association, 37 (2): 143–172, doi:10.1017/S0025100306002829, S2CID 14275190
- Saborit Vilar, Josep (2009), Millorem la pronúncia [Let's improve the pronunciation], Recerca (in Valencian), vol. 11, Acadèmia Valenciana de la Llengua
- Wheeler, Max W.; Yates, Alan; Dols Salas, Nicolau (1999), Catalan: A Comprehensive Grammar, Routledge Comprehensive Grammars, London: Routledge, doi:10.4324/9780203028506, ISBN 978-0-415-10342-8
- Wheeler, Max W. (2005), The Phonology of Catalan, The Phonology of the World's Languages, Oxford, UK: Oxford University Press, ISBN 978-0-19-925814-7
