= Stress and vowel reduction in Catalan =

Catalan phonology differentiates between stressed and unstressed syllables. In unstressed position, vowels are usually and systematically reduced in all dialects.

== Stress ==
Catalan contrasts stressed and unstressed syllables. Stress most often occurs on any of the last three syllables of a word (e.g., brúixola [ˈbɾu(j)ʃulə] (C) / [ˈbɾu(j)ʃolɐ] (NW) 'compass'; càstig [ˈkästik] (C / NW) 'punishment'; pallús [pəˈʎus] (C) / [pɐˈʎus] (NW) 'fool').

In Catalan, word stress follows predictable default rules based on a word's ending, and written accent marks are used when a word breaks those patterns. Depending on where the emphasis falls, Catalan words fall into three main groups:

- Agudes (Oxytones): The stress falls on the last syllable. An accent is written on an aguda if it ends in a vowel, a vowel + ⟨s⟩, -en, or -in (e.g., avió 'airplane', després 'after'). Otherwise, no accent is written volar 'to fly').
- Planes (Paroxytones): The stress falls on the second-to-last syllable (penultimate). An accent is written on a plana if it does not end in a vowel, a vowel + ⟨s⟩, -en, or -in (e.g., plàstic 'plastic', gràfic 'graphic'). Otherwise, no accent is written (e.g., casa 'house').
- Esdrúixoles (Proparoxytones): The stress falls on the third-to-last syllable or earlier. Esdrúixoles always carry an accent mark (e.g., àguila 'eagle', pólvora 'gun powder').

Minimal pairs

Minimal pairs where stress change the meaning:

- fàbrica 'factory'
- fabrica 'he/she makes'
- fabricà 'he/she made'

Accent marks and vowel quality

In Catalan, accent marks also indicate whether a mid-vowel is open or closed:

- Acute accents (é, ó) indicate a closed-mid sound (/e, o/): església 'church' and fórmula 'formula'.
- Grave accents (è, ò) indicate an open-mid sound (/ɛ, ɔ/): ciència 'science' and lògica 'logic'.

Further contrast in vowel quality is found in monosyllabic words with diacritical accent and without (examples in Eastern Catalan):

- mà /ˈma/ ('hand') vs. ma /mə/ ('my', [f.])
- sé /ˈse/ ('I know') vs. se /sə/ ('itself')
- pèl /ˈpɛl/ ('hair') vs. pel /pəl/ ('for the', [c.])
- món /ˈmon/ ('world') vs. mon /mun/ ('my', [m.])

=== Secondary stress ===
Compound words and adverbs formed with /ˈment/ may have a syllable with secondary stress (e.g., parallamps [ˌpäɾəˈʎam(p)s] (C) / [ˌpäɾɐˈʎam(p)s] (NW) 'lightning conductor', bonament [ˌbɔnəˈmen̪(t)] (C) / [ˌbɔnɐˈmen̪(t)] (NW) 'willingly') but every lexical word has just one syllable with main stress.

== Vowel reduction ==
Most dialects contrast at least seven stressed vowels (/a, ɛ, e, i, ɔ, o, u/), an exception is most Balearic dialects, which contrast eight (the formers, plus /ə/). In unstressed position, and depending on the dialect, vowels are reduced to the followings:

General Eastern Catalan
Term	IPA	Gloss
parla	ə (Note: In Barcelona, it can become near-open [ɐ].) (Note: In Algherese, it becomes open [a] (or it approaches near-open, [ɐ]).)	'speech'
rere	ə	'back'
lliri	i	'lily'
ferro	u	'iron'
mutu	u	'mutual'

Mallorcan Balearic [Eastern Catalan]
Term	IPA	Gloss
parla	ə	'speech'
rere	ə	'back'
lliri	i (Note: In Valencian and Balearic, unstressed /i/ and /u/ can be pronounced as [ɪ] and [ʊ], respectively.)	'lily'
ferro	o (Note: In Mallorcan, pretonic /o/ merges with /u/ in words that contain a close tonic vowel.) (Note: In the local Sóller dialect, unstressed /o/ is normally realized as [u] (or [ʊ]), like in the rest of Eastern dialects.)	'iron'
mutu	u	'mutual'

General Western Catalan
Term	IPA	Gloss
parla	a (Note: In Valencian and North-Western Catalan, unstressed /a/ approaches [ɐ], although it is not especially much different from stress /a/.)	'speech'
rere	e	'back'
lliri	i	'lily'
ferro	o	'iron'
mutu	u	'mutual'

Notes:

In Eastern Catalan, vowels in unstressed position reduce to three: /a/, /e/, /ɛ/ → [ə] (also phonetically [ɐ] in Barcelona); /o/, /ɔ/ → [u], and /i/ and /u/ remain unchanged. So the unstressed vowel inventory in Eastern Catalan is essentially [ə, i, u]. However, there are some dialectal differences: Algherese merges /a/, /e/ and /ɛ/ with /a/; and in most areas of Mallorca, [o] can appear in unstressed position (that is, /o/ and /ɔ/ are usually reduced to [o]). (The unstressed phones [ɪ] and [ʊ] can also be found in the Balearic dialects instead of [i] and [u]).

- Unstressed [ə]:
  - It may be elided in contact with rhotics (e.g., barana [bəˈɾänə] → [ˈbɾänə] 'railing', taronja [təˈɾɔɲʒə] → [ˈtɾɔɲʒə] 'orange', veritat [bəɾiˈtat] → [bɾiˈtat] 'true', però [pəˈɾɔ] → [ˈpɾɔ] 'but'), this is partially reflected in the orthography: cargol (Standard Catalan) vs. caragol (Standard Valencian) ('snail'). It is also observed in three combinations with the preposition per (usually meaning 'for', 'by', 'per'): per això [pəɾ əˈʃɔ] → [pəɾˈʃɔ] ('because of this'), per aquí [pəɾ əˈki] → [pəɾˈki] ('around here') and per allà [pəɾ əˈʎa] → [pəɾˈʎa] ('around there'). This also occurs in per a ('for'), which in speech can be reduced to per ([pəɾ ə] → [pəɾ]), which can cause ambiguity.
  - [ə] can also be omitted in rapid speech in the verb anar [əˈnä] → [ˈnä] ('to go'); e.g., vols anar? [ˈbɔɫz‿əˈnä] → [ˌbɔɫzˈnä] ('do you want to go?'), in the word adeu [əˈðew] → [ˈdew] ('goodbye') and in contact with other vowels (e.g., quina hora és? [ˈkinə ˈɔɾə ˈes] → [ˌkin‿ˈɔɾə ˈes] 'what time is it?', el que hem dit [əɫ kə ˈɛm ˈdit] → [əɫ ˈkɛm ˈdit] 'what we have said').
- Unstressed /i/ (stays mostly unchanged):
  - In some Eastern Catalan accents unstressed /i/ is pronounced as a semivowel ([j]) before after another vowel with the digraph ⟨ix⟩: caixa [ˈkajʃə], this is akin to many Western Catalan dialects. In Standard Eastern Catalan it is silent ([ˈkaʃə]).
- Unstressed /u/ (stays mostly unchanged):
  - It may be elided in the expression si us plau → [sisˈpɫɑw] ('please').
- Unstressed /a/, /e/ and /o/ appear only in some words (often due to vowel harmony, see Central Catalan vowel harmony), especially in learned terms from other languages (e.g., allegro [ɑɫˈɫeɣɾo] 'allegro', oceans [useˈäns] 'oceans', ego [ˈeɣo] 'ego') and in the unstressed diphthong /ow/ [ow], which varies with [əw] in informal speech (e.g., mouré [mowˈɾe] or [məwˈɾe] 'I will move'). In other cases, they merge with [ə] and [u] (Wheeler (2005:61–72)).

Other cases:

- Stressed /e/ may rarely undergo univerbation if accompanied by another word and be pronounced as a single oxytone word, causing the reduction of /e/ to [ə] in Eastern dialects (e.g., és clar [ˈes ˈkɫɑ] → [əsˈkɫɑ] 'of course').
- Similar cases occur with stressed /o/ being reduced to [u] (e.g., més o menys [ˈmez‿o ˈmɛɲʃ] → [ˈmez‿u ˈmɛɲʃ] 'more or less').
- In Balearic and some Central Catalan accents, unstressed initial [o] can diphthongize to [əw], similar to RP go /ɡəʊ/; e.g., olor [əwˈɫo]) 'smell' (n.). This is regarded as non-standard.

In Western Catalan (which includes Valencian and North-Western Catalan), vowels in unstressed position reduce to five: /e/, /ɛ/ → [e]; /o/, /ɔ/ → [o]; /a/ (except in some cases), /i/, /u/ remain unchanged, those vowels are [a, e, i, o, u] (the phone [ɐ] is now more frequent in Western dialects, and the phones [ɪ], [ʊ] can be found instead of [i], [u] in southern varieties, like Valencian). In many Western dialects reduced vowels tend to merge into different realizations in some cases, sometimes unpredictably (the following examples are in Valencian):

- Unstressed /a/:
  - It is usually close to [ɐ] (without assimilation).
    - In some Western accents [ə] may occur.
  - Post-tonic final unstressed /a/ becomes [ɛ] and/or [ɔ] (phonetically lower and/or centralized) when preceded by a syllable with stressed /ɛ/ and/or /ɔ/; e.g., tela /ˈtɛla/ → [ˈtɛ̞lɛ̞̈] 'cloth', 'fabric'; hora /ˈɔɾa/ → [ˈɔ̞ɾɔ̞̈] 'hour'. For further detail see Valencian vowel harmony.
    - In a wider sense, vowel assimilations can occur in further instances (that is all or most instances of final unstressed /а/, regardless of the preceding sounds and involving palatalisation and/or velarisation): xica [ˈt͡ʃikɛ̞̈] or [ˈt͡ʃikɔ̞̈] ('girl'). This is considered non-standard.
    - A characteristic feature of the pronunciation of some North-Western speakers is the pronunciation of the unstressed final /a/ as [ɛ], regardless of the preceding sounds; e.g., Lleida [ˈʎejðɛ] ('Lleida'), pronounced [ˈʎejðɐ] (or broader [ˈʎejða]) in General Western Catalan and [ˈʎejðə] in Eastern Catalan.
  - It is accepted in Valencian the pronunciation of the suffix -ista as [-iste] in the masculine form, thus artista 'artist' (m.) is pronounced [äɾˈtiste].
- Unstressed /e/:
  - It may merge with /a/ before a nasal or sibilant consonant (e.g., entens [ɐn̪ˈtens] 'you understand', escoltar [ɐskoɫ̪ˈtäɾ] 'to listen'), in some environments before any consonant (e.g., terròs [tɐˈrɔ̞s] 'clod (of earth)', 'lump'), and, sometimes, in monosyllabic clitics.
  - It may merge into /i/ when in contact with palatal consonants (e.g., senyor [sɪˈɲo(ɾ)] 'lord'). Rarely initial es- can become [ɪs-]; e.g., estiu [ɪsˈtiw] ('summer'), and it may alternate with the more frequently sequence [ɐs-]: [ɐsˈtiw]. In Standard Valencian, /e/ → /i/ ([ɪ]) is only accepted in terms with the suffix -ixement: naixement [nɐjʃɪˈmen̪t] ('birth').
- Unstressed /i/ (stays mostly unchanged).
- Unstressed /o/:
  - It may merge with /u/ before a bilabial consonant (e.g., cobert [kʊˈbɛ̞ɾt] 'covered', 'cutlery'), before a stressed syllable with a high vowel (e.g., sospira [sʊsˈpiɾɐ] 'he/she sighs'). Furthermore, in some rare cases, it can also be reduced in contact with palatals (e.g., Josep [d͡ʒʊˈzɛ̞p] 'Joseph'), and, sometimes in some local dialects, in monosyllabic clitics.
  - Note in some colloquial speeches (similar to Eastern Catalan dialects) initial unstressed /o/ can diphthongise to /aw/ [ɑw] (phonetically [ɐw]); e.g., olor [ɐwˈɫoɾ]) 'smell' (n.). This is regarded as non-standard.
- Unstressed /u/ (stays mostly unchanged).
- The phones /ɛ/ ([ɛ̞]) and /ɔ/ ([ɔ̞]):
  - Besides vowel harmony or vowel assimilation, unstressed /ɛ/ and /ɔ/ (i.e., phonetically lower and/or centralized) may be found sporadically in compounds like dèsset [ˈdɛ̞sɛ̞t] (V) 'seventeen' and dènou (or dèneu) [ˈdɛ̞nɔ̞w] (or [ˈdɛ̞nɛ̞w]) (V) 'nineteen'.

== See also ==
- Catalan phonology
  - Catalan vowel harmony
- Dialectal variation in Catalan phonology

== Bibliography ==
- Carbonell Costa, Joan F.; Llisterri Boix, Joaquim (1992), "Catalan", Journal of the International Phonetic Association, 22 (1–2), International Phonetic Association & Cambridge University Press: 53–56, doi:10.1017/S0025100300004618, S2CID 249411809
- Carbonell Costa, Joan F.; Llisterri Boix, Joaquim (1999), "Catalan", Handbook of the International Phonetic Association: A Guide to the Usage of the International Phonetic Alphabet, Cambridge, UK: Cambridge University Press, pp. 61–65, ISBN 978-0-521-63751-0
- Recasens Vives, Daniel (1996) [1991], Fonètica descriptiva del català: assaig de caracterització de la pronúncia del vocalisme i el consonantisme català al segle XX, Biblioteca Filològica (in Catalan), vol. 21 (2nd ed.), Barcelona, Spain: Institut d'Estudis Catalans, ISBN 978-84-7283-312-8
- Wheeler, Max W. (2005), The Phonology of Catalan, The Phonology of the World's Languages, Oxford, UK: Oxford University Press, ISBN 978-0-19-925814-7
- Saborit Vilar, Josep (2009), Millorem la pronúncia [Let's improve the pronunciation], Recerca (in Valencian), vol. 11, Acadèmia Valenciana de la Llengua
