= Franca Masu =

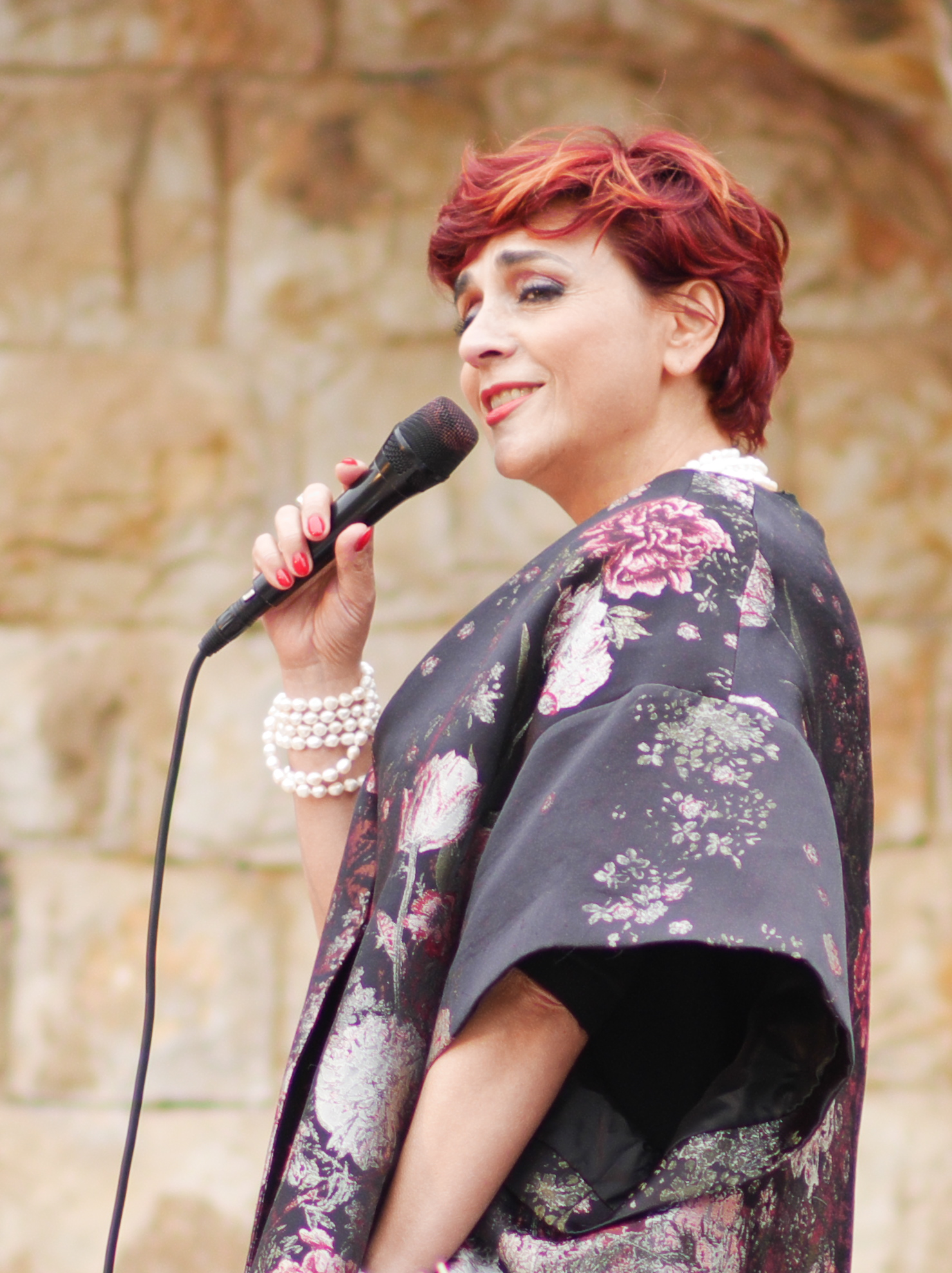
- Masu in concert in Benassal, Valencia (2018)

Background information
- Born: 23 May 1962 (age 64); Alghero, Sardinia, Italy
- Genres: World, jazz, fado
- Occupation: Singer-songwriter
- Instruments: Vocals
- Years active: 1990–present
- Label: Aramúsica
- Website: www.francamasu.com

Franca Masu (born 23 May 1962) is a singer songwriter often working in the Catalan Algherese dialect. At her debut Tony Scott declared her "one of Italy's top vocal talents". She is an occasional actress and poet, and her songs often incorporate the work of Algherese poets. She also sings in Portuguese and is a fine exponent of fado. She has released several CDs and has performed concerts in Italy and across Europe.

== Discography ==
- El meu viatge, Saint Rock, 2000
- Alguímia, Aramusica, 2003
- Aquamare, Aramusica-Felmay 2006
- Hoy como ayer, Aramusica, 2008
- 10 Anys, Aramusica, 2011
- Almablava, Aramusica, 2013
- Cordemar, WMusic, 2021
