= Catalan vowel harmony =

Phonological process

Catalan vowel harmony (also termed Valencian vowel harmony, especially when referring to Valencian) is a phonological process in which vowels assimilate (harmonize) to share certain distinctive features.

== Valencian ==
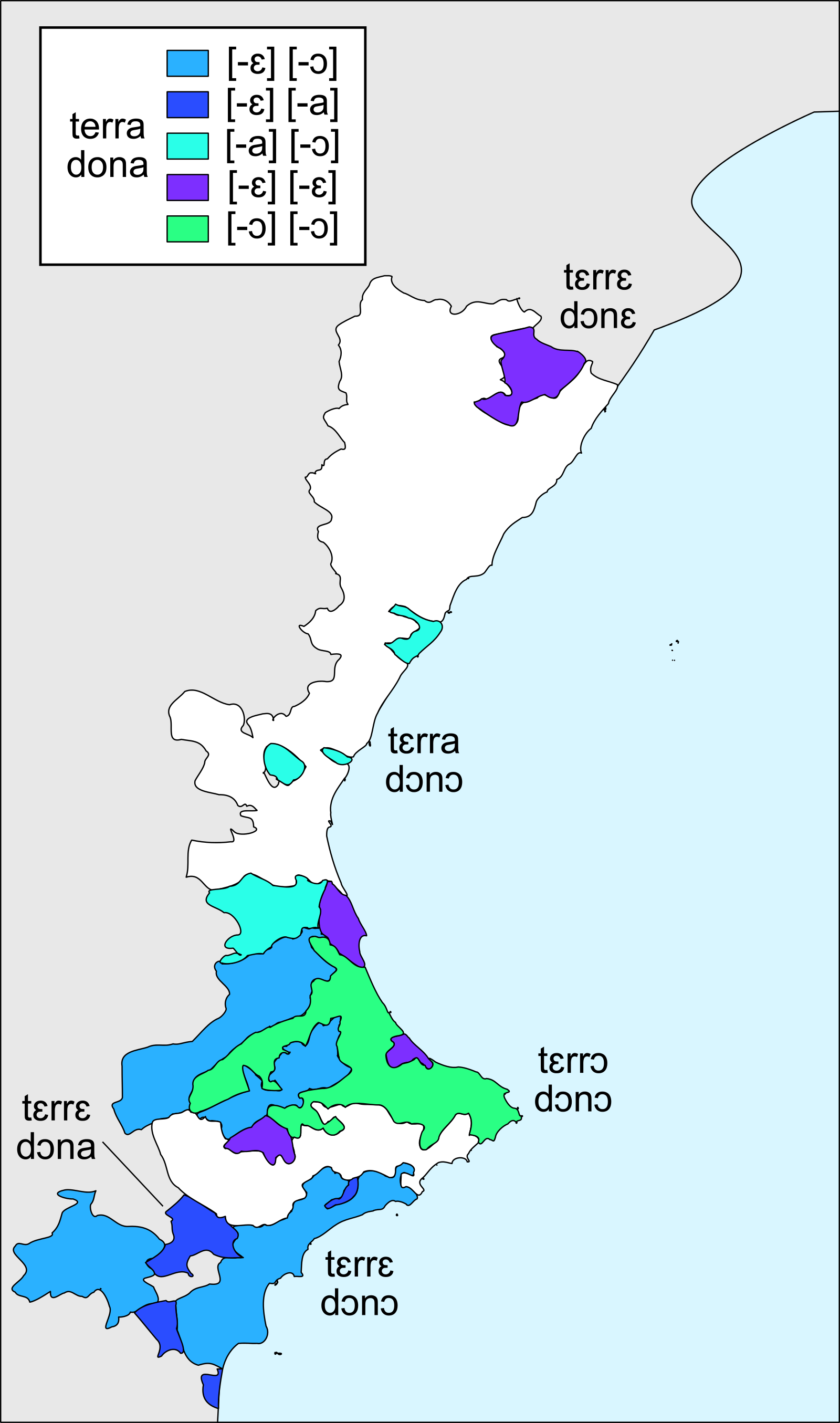
Presence of vowel harmony in Valencian.

The harmony of Valencian is a clear example of harmony conditioned by a strong element: in some Valencian dialects, word-final post-tonic /a/ becomes [ɛ] and [ɔ]—usually lower and/or somewhat centralized: [ɛ̞̈] ([æ]) and [ɔ̞̈] ([ɒ])—when the preceding syllable contains tonic open-mid (or more precisely "near-open") vowels /ɛ/ and /ɔ/; that is, /ɛ/ and /ɔ/ propagate the front and back features, respectively, to the final vowel /a/, as the examples. The articulatory features extend from a phonologically privileged position—the stressed syllable—to a weak position—an unstressed syllable—a perceptual asymmetry emphasized by the fact that the harmony trigger belongs to the radical while the assimilated segment is normally an inflectional affix.

a)
Example	IPA	Translation
terra	[ˈtɛrɛ]	'Earth', 'land'
tela	[ˈtɛlɛ]	'cloth', 'fabric'
pela	[ˈpɛlɛ]	'he/she peels'
perla	[ˈpɛɾlɛ]	'pearl'

b)
Example	IPA	Translation
cosa	[ˈkɔzɔ]	'thing'
mora	[ˈmɔɾɔ]	'Moor' (f.)
tova	[ˈtɔvɔ]	'soft' (f.)
vora	[ˈvɔɾɔ]	'edge', 'shore'

In the most widespread system of harmony, both open-mid vowels cause assimilation; in other systems, distributed over the harmonic territory quite randomly, only one of the vowels triggers the change. For example, in Cullera only the front vowel causes assimilation, while in Borriana the back vowel is the only one that allows harmony. However, in both the broadest and the narrowest versions, and even in the sporadic cases of two-way harmony that are presented here, the pattern of strong → weak extension remains constant.

General Valencian is a variety in which the extension of features is limited to the main metric foot: in plain words, the final post-tonic, which is part of the main foot, is affected by harmony a); on the other hand, in proparoxytone words (esdrúixoles) the final does not belong to the main foot and is, therefore, beyond the scope of assimilation b). In Valencian from the south of Alicante, the harmony affects an intermediate layer between the main metrical foot and the clitic group: the prosodic word (PPr) (cfr. Montoya (1989), Segura (1996), Beltran (2008)).

Harmony in General Valencian:

a)
Example	IPA	Translation
afecta	[ɐˈfɛktɛ]	'affects'
granota	[ɡɾɐˈnɔtɔ]	'frog'

b)
Example	IPA	Translation
mèdica	[ˈmɛðɪkɐ]	'medic' (f.)
ròtula	[ˈrɔtʊlɐ]	'kneecap'

Harmony from Southern Valencian (Alicante):

a)
Example	IPA	Translation
afecta	[ɛˈfɛktɛ]	'affects'
granota	[ɡɾɔˈnɔtɔ]	'frog'

While harmonic patterns affecting just the final post-tonic /a/ within the morphological word domain are often attested in Southern Valencian varieties, recent phonetic evidence (Herrero (2022)) shows that the harmonic domain is not uniformly restricted to morphological boundaries. This new empirical evidence reveals that harmony may extend beyond the lexical word in specific prosodic configurations, challenging traditional descriptions and motivating a re-examination of the factors that regulate its scope. In particular, vowel harmony is also found when oxytone verbs are followed by the enclitic /la/, as in perd-la /ˈpɛɾd.la/ → [ˈpɛɾlɛ] 'lose it' (f.), cou-la /ˈkɔw.la/ → [ˈkɔwlɔ] 'cook it' (f.), where harmony reaches the clitic vowel. However, two asymmetries arise when sequences of a verb plus a clitic are involved. First, while assimilation is nearly categorical in canonical word-internal contexts (e.g., tela, cosa), only 75–85% of oxytone + clitic tokens display harmony. Second, in paroxytone verbs followed by the same enclitic /la/, assimilation consistently targets the post-tonic vowel of the verb but (usually) never extends to the clitic: serra-la /ˈsɛra.la/ → [ˈsɛrɛla] 'saw it' (f.), toca-la /ˈtɔka.la/ → [ˈtɔkɔla] 'touch it' (f.).

== Mallorcan ==
In the harmonic phenomenon just described, articulatory features spread from left to right. However, there is no shortage of assimilations in which the features spread to the left of the prominent position. This occurs in Mallorcan when pretonic /o/ is closed to [u] in words that contain a close tonic vowel; e.g., c[u]nill, c[u]sí, c[u]mú (cf. Veny Clar (1982)). The change involves the extension of the height feature again in the direction dictated by the strong → weak saliency relationship.

== Tortosan ==
Similar closures to Mallorcan vowel harmony are documented in various Western languages and dialects; among these, Tortosan stands out, where the phenomenon, quite variable and often limited to the elderly, presents the peculiarity that height does not only propagate from tonic vowels, but can also do so from unstressed ones (cfr. Morales). In general terms, and in accordance with the data collected by Morales (in prep.), a pretonic mid vowel may become close under the influence of a close vowel with the same point of articulation—palatal or labial—in a following syllable; in this way, vowel sequences of the type e...i and o...u become i...i a) and u...u b), respectively. The assimilation of mid vowels to a high vowel of a different point of articulation is possible, but in the sequence e...u it is reduced to some words c), and in the sequence o...i it is usually limited to fossilized cases, so that the disharmonious alternatives in d) reflect only copied pronunciations of the orthography.

a)
Example	IPA	Translation
melic	[miˈlik]	'belly button'
delicat	[diliˈkat]	'delicate'

b)
Example	IPA	Translation
absolut	[apsuˈlut]	'absolute'
bromur	[bɾuˈmuɾ]	'bromide'

c)
Example	IPA	Translation
betum	[biˈtum]	'betumen'
menut	[miˈnut]	'small'

d)
Example	IPA	Translation
avorrir	[aβuˈriɾ]	'to bore'
botiga	[buˈtiɣa]	'shop'

Of the phenomena presented above, the most common and systematic is the change e...i → i...i. As in the examples, /e/ becomes [i] when it precedes a stressed /i/ or unstressed /i/. Closure can even affect a series of two pretonic vowels. Assimilation never affects stressed vowels and there is also no harmony when /e/ and /i/ do not occupy adjacent syllables.

With certain restrictions, the phenomenon can modify the final vowel of the first element of a compound and proclitic elements such as numerals or unstressed pronouns. In the last case, when the vowel of the pronoun is not strictly adjacent to the syllable that triggers the harmony, there is no assimilation; according to Morales (in prep.), the lack of spread is related to the fact that groups of pronouns generate a secondary accent, which would protect the original quality of the vowel.

Morales also reports some examples of rightward (regressive) assimilation between weak elements; that is, cases where an unstressed sequence i...e becomes i...i. Harmony to the right is documented only between vowels that are in pretonic position; therefore, the inflectional elements and the post-tonic vowels belonging to the radical are excluded from the change.

== Central Catalan ==
In the harmony of Valencian, Mallorcan and, mostly, Tortosan, the features extend from a strong element to a weak element. In the other possible model, on the other hand, the features are spread in the reverse direction, that is, from positions that are not prominent to positions that are stronger from the perceptual point of view. The trigger for change is in this case a weak element (cf. Walker (2005)). Central Catalan provides an example of harmony—with considerable geographical and idiolectal variation—conditioned by segments located in weak positions. In this dialect, stressed mid vowels in words from other languages tend to be adapted as open mids, as in the paroxytones in example a), with regular reduction in the unstressed syllable, that is, with the vowels [ə], [i] and [u] in this position. Borrowings also have the peculiarity that they tend to block the neutralization of the unstressed middle vowels e and o, which are realized as [e] and [o], respectively. In principle, these two trends should not be mutually exclusive; however, if the post-tonic sound is close-mid, the tonic mids are usually also realized as close, as shown by the plain words in example b), in which the levelling between the two vowels is almost universal. Therefore, the quality of the most prominent vowel is determined by the features of the following vowel, since the appearance of close-mid vowels in tonic position depends on the presence of vowels of the same pitch in the post-tonic syllable.

a)
Example	IPA	Translation
Creta	[ˈkɾɛtə]	'Crete'
euro	[ˈɛwɾu]	'Euro'
Betty	[ˈbɛti]	'Betty'
Rodes	[ˈrɔðəs]	'Rhodes'
poli	[ˈpɔli]	'cop'
gnosi	[ˈnɔzi]	'gnosis'

b)
Example	IPA	Translation
Lesbos	[ˈlezβos]	'Lesbos'
euro	[ˈewɾo]	'Euro'
Bette	[ˈbete]	'Bette'
Rodos	[ˈroðos]	'Rodos'
polo	[ˈpolo]	'polo'
Cnossos	[ˈnosos]	'Knossos'

In proparoxytones there is greater variability. In the variety analyzed by Cabré Castellví (2009) esdrúixol words (i.e., words with stressed on the antepenultimate syllable) are generally subject to the same restrictions and the presence of a close mid in post-tonic position implies the presence of close mids in tonic position a); the syllabic adjacency between the two vowels is key to harmony, since words like Sòcrates [ˈsɔkɾətes] or Hèrcules [ˈɛrkules] are usually presented without assimilation despite the presence of an unreduced post-tonic e. In the variety described by Bonet Alsina, Lloret-Romanyach & Mascaró Altimiras (2007), on the other hand, post-tonic vowels do not condition the realization of the tonic vowel in esdrúixols b). On the other hand, and in accordance with the interpretation of the aforementioned authors, the adaptation of tonic vowels as open mids is compatible in all varieties with the appearance of unreduced mid vowels in pre-tonic syllables.

a)
Example	IPA	Translation
Jespersen	[ˈʒespeɾsen]	'Jespersen'
Penèlope	[peˈnelope]	'Penelope'
Hölderlin	[ˈxoldeɾlin]	'Hölderlin'

b)
Example	IPA	Translation
Jespersen	[ˈʒɛspeɾsen]	'Jespersen'
Penèlope	[peˈnɛlope]	'Penelope'
Sòfocles	[ˈsɔfokles]	'Sophocles'

Other harmony examples in Central Catalan:

Example	IPA
Everest	[eβeˈɾɛst]
Interpol	[inteɾˈpɔl]

Example	IPA
OPEC	[oˈpɛk]
Repsol	[repˈsɔl]

Example	IPA
Flaubert	[floˈβɛɾt]
Montessori	[monteˈsɔɾi]

== See also ==
- Catalan phonology
  - Stress and vowel reduction in Catalan
- Dialectal variation in Catalan phonology

== Bibliography ==
- Beltran, Vicent (2008), El parlar de les Valls del Vinalopó i del Carxe, Petrer, Alicante: Centre d'Estudis Locals del Vinalopó
- Bonet Alsina, Eulàlia; Lloret-Romanyach, Maria-Rosa; Mascaró Altimiras, Joan (2007), Domain and directionality in Catalan ATR harmony
- Cabré Castellví, Maria Teresa (2009), "Vowel reduction and vowel harmony in Eastern Catalan loanword phonology", in Vigário, Marina; Frota, Sónia; Freitas, M. João (eds.), Phonetics and Phonology: Interactions and interrelations, Current Issues in Linguistic Theory, vol. 306, John Benjamins, pp. 267–286, doi:10.1075/cilt.306.13cab, ISBN 978-90-272-4822-0
- Herrero, Ricard (2022), Variació i estabilitat en el sistema vocàlic del valencià: anàlisi acústica de l'harmonia vocàlica (in Valencian), Valencia: Universitat de València
- Jiménez, Jesús; Lloret-Romanyach, Maria-Rosa (2009), Harmonia vocàlica: Paràmetres i variació (PDF) (in Catalan)
- Montoya, Brauli (1989), La interferència lingüística al sud valencià (in Valencian), Valencia: Generalitat Valenciana
- Morales, Alfonso, Height Harmony in Tortosí Catalan, Washington D.C.: Georgetown University
- Segura, Carles (1996), Estudi lingüístic del parlar d'Alacant (in Valencian), Alicante: Institut d'Estudis Juan Gil-Albert, Generalitat Valenciana
- Veny Clar, Joan (1982) [1978], Els parlars catalans. (Síntesi de dialectologia catalana) (in Catalan), Palma, Spain: Editorial Moll
- Walker, Rachel (2005), Weak Triggers in Vowel Harmony, Natural Language and Linguistic Theory, vol. 23, pp. 917–989
