= Rafael Sari =

Rafael Sari (1904 in Alghero – 1978) was a popular Sardinian poet and writer in Catalan. He worked as a school teacher and archivist of Alghero. From 1929 onwards he regularly published, in newspapers and magazines in Alghero in the Algherese dialect of Catalan, articles and poems - several of which won literary awards. His poetry is of an intimate nature and his compositions are often put to music. He was also founder and first secretary of the Cultural Centre for Alghero, along with Rafael Catardi - which now runs the annual literary prize in Alghero which bears his name.

== Bibliography ==
- Rima, memòria, poesia ... with Domènec Guansé and Miquel Palau, Editex, 1958.
- Ciutat mia: (Pà di casa), Edizioni Della Torre, 1984.
- Ombra i sol: poemes de l'Alguer - 1980.
