= Maria Chessa Lai =

Italian poet

Cover of Sea of Mine/ La Mia Mar 2005

Maria Chessa Lai (15 February 1922 in Monti – 7 February 2012 in Alghero) was an Italian poet writing in the Catalan Algherese dialect. She was three times winner of the Premio Ozieri awarded annually for the best new poetry written in a Sardinian minority language. As a bilingual poet she published her poems simultaneously in Algherese and Italian. The majority of her work was collected together and published in the volume La Mia Mar in 2005. Sixty nine of her poems translated into english were published in 2021, in a bilingual Catalan/English edition, under the title: Collected Poems/ Recull de poesies de l'Alguer—including this extract from the poem called Marçanella Helichrysum Golden Sun

... Within its flowers
the reflection of clear light.
And when in the quiet of those hours
the flower that bloomed then desists
upon the path at the rim
of the crumbling abyss
it yet persists intenser in strength
within its aromatic existence.
[Collected Poems 2021]

Chessa Lai was the mother of the journalist, academic, and writer Pasquale Chessa.

== Bibliography ==
- La Mia Mar, Edes, Sassari, 2005
- Collected Poems/ Recull de poesies de l'Alguer 2021 ISBN 978-88-99504-41-0 Deposited with the National Poetry Library UK.
