= Voiced bilabial plosive =

Consonantal sound represented by ⟨b⟩ in IPA

b
- IPA number: 102

Audio sample
- source · help

Encoding
- Entity (decimal): &#98;
- Unicode (hex): U+0062
- X-SAMPA: b
- Braille: ⠃ (braille pattern dots-12)
Image

A voiced bilabial plosive or stop is a type of consonantal sound used in many spoken languages. It is familiar to English-speakers as the "b" sound in "obey". The symbol in the International Phonetic Alphabet that represents this sound is ⟨b⟩.

== Features ==
Sagittal section of a voiced bilabial plosive

Features of a voiced bilabial stop:

- Its manner of articulation is occlusive, which means it is produced by obstructing airflow in the vocal tract. Since the consonant is also oral, with no nasal outlet, it is a plosive.
- Its place of articulation is bilabial, which means it is articulated with both lips.
- Its phonation is voiced, which means the vocal cords vibrate during the articulation.
- It is an oral consonant, which means that air is not allowed to escape through the nose.
- Because the sound is not produced with airflow over the tongue, the median–lateral dichotomy does not apply.
- Its airstream mechanism is pulmonic, which means it is articulated by pushing air only with the intercostal muscles and abdominal muscles, as in most speech sounds.

== Occurrence ==
Occurrence of [b] in several languages
Language		Word	IPA	Meaning	Notes
Adyghe		бгъу / bġ°	[bʁʷə]	'nine'	
Albanian		bletë	['bletə]	'bee'	
Arabic	Standard	باب / bāb	[baːb]	'door'	See Arabic phonology
Assyrian		ܒܒܐ baba	[baːba]	'father'	
Armenian	Eastern	բարի/bari	[bɑˈɾi]	'kind'	
Basque		bero	[beɾo]	'hot'	
Bengali		বলো / balo	[bɔlo]	'say!'	Contrasts with aspirated form. See Bengali phonology
Breton		bara	[baɾa]	'bread'	
Catalan	Most dialects	bell	[ˈbeʎ]	'beautiful'	See Catalan phonology
Catalan	Many dialects	vell	[ˈbeʎ]	'old'	Betacism (found in Northern, North-Western and Central Catalan and in Central Valencian).
Chechen		борз / borz	[borz]	'wolf'	
Czech		bublina	[ˈbublɪna]	'bubble'	See Czech phonology
Danish	Standard	løber	[ˈløːbɐ]	'runner'	Only partially voiced; possible allophone of /b/ in the intervocalic position. More often voiceless [p]. See Danish phonology
Dutch		boer	[buːr]	'farmer'	See Dutch phonology
English		aback	[əˈbæk]	'aback'	See English phonology
Esperanto		batalo	[baˈtalo]	'war'	See Esperanto phonology
Filipino		buto	[buto]	'bone'	
French		boue	[bu]	'mud'	See French phonology
Georgian		ბავშვი / bavšvi	[ˈbavʃvi]	'child'	
German		aber	[ˈäːbɐ]	'but'	See Standard German phonology
Greek		μπόχα / bócha	[ˈbo̞xa]	'reek'	See Modern Greek phonology
Gujarati		બક્રી / bakri	[bəkri]	'goat'	See Gujarati phonology
Hebrew		בית / báyit	[bajit]	'house'	See Modern Hebrew phonology
Hindustani	Hindi	बाल / bāl	[bäːl]	'hair'	Contrasts with aspirated version /bʱ/. See Hindi-Urdu phonology
Hindustani	Urdu	بال / bāl	[bäːl]	'hair'	Contrasts with aspirated version /bʱ/. See Hindi-Urdu phonology
Hungarian		baba	[ˈbɒbɒ]	'baby'	See Hungarian phonology
Italian		bile	[ˈbile]	'rage'	See Italian phonology
Japanese		番 / ban	[baɴ]	'(one's) turn'	See Japanese phonology
Kabardian		бгъуы/bg"uy	[bʁʷə]	'nine'	
Korean		지붕 / jibung	[t͡ɕibuŋ]	'roof'	See Korean phonology
Kurdish	Northern	bav	[bɑːv]	'father'	See Kurdish phonology
Kurdish	Central	باوک/bâwk	[bɑːwk]	'father'	See Kurdish phonology
Kurdish	Southern	باوگ/bâwig	[bɑːwɨg]	'father'	See Kurdish phonology
Luxembourgish		geblosen	[ɡ̊əˈbloːzən]	'blown'	More often voiceless [p]. See Luxembourgish phonology
Macedonian		убав/ubav	[ˈubav]	'beautiful'	See Macedonian phonology
Malay		baru	[bäru]	'new'	
Malayalam		ബലം/balam	[bɐlɐm]	'strength'	See Malayalam phonology
Maltese		għatba	[aːtˈba]	'threshold'	
Marathi		बटाटा / baṭāṭā	[bəˈʈaːʈaː]	'potato'	See Marathi phonology
Nepali		बाटो / bāṭo	[bäʈo]	'path'	See Nepali phonology
Norwegian		bål	[ˈbɔːl]	'bonfire'	See Norwegian phonology
Odia		ବାର/barô	[bärɔ]	'twelve'	Contrasts with aspirated form.
Persian		خوب/ xub	[xub]	'good'	See Persian phonology
Pirahã		pibaóí	[ˈpìbàóí̯]	'parent'	
Polish		bas	[bäs]	'bass'	See Polish phonology
Portuguese		bato	[ˈbatu]	'I strike'	See Portuguese phonology
Punjabi		ਬਿੱਲੀ/billī	[bɪlːi]	'cat'	
Romanian		bou	[bow]	'bull'	See Romanian phonology.
Russian		рыба / ryba	[ˈrɨbə]	'fish'	Contrasts with palatalized form. See Russian phonology
Serbo-Croatian		биће / biće	[bǐːt͡ɕě]	'being'	See Serbo-Croatian phonology
Slovak		byť	[bi̞c]	'to be'	
Slovene		biti	[ˈbìːt̪í]	'to be'	
Southern Min		閩 / ban	[ban]	'Fujian province'	Only in colloquial speech.
Spanish		invertir	[ĩmbe̞ɾˈt̪iɾ]	'to invest'	See Spanish phonology
Swedish		bra	[ˈbɾɑː]	'good'	May be an approximant in casual speech. See Swedish phonology
Telugu		బడి	[badi]	'school'	Contrasts with aspirated form. Aspirated form is articulated as breathy consonant.
Thai		บำบัด / bam-bàt	[bam.bat̚]	'therapy'	See Thai phonology
Turkish		bulut	[buˈɫut̪]	'cloud'	See Turkish phonology
Tyap		bai	[bai]	'to come'	
Ukrainian		брат / brat	[brɑt̪]	'brother'	See Ukrainian phonology
Welsh		mab	[mɑːb]	'son'	See Welsh phonology
West Frisian		bak	[bak]	'tray'	
Wu		皮 / bi	[bi]	'skin'	
Xiang		浮 / baw	[bau]	'to float'	
Yi		ꁧ / bbo	[bo˧]	'mountain'	
Zapotec	Tilquiapan	bald	[bald]	'few'	

== See also ==
- Betacism
- List of phonetics topics

== Notes ==
Place →	Labial					Coronal										Dorsal					Laryngeal			
Manner ↓	Bilabial		Labiodental		Linguolabial		Dental		Alveolar		Postalveolar		Retroflex		(Alveolo-)palatal		Velar		Uvular		Pharyngeal/epiglottal		Glottal	
Nasal	m̥	m	ɱ̊	ɱ		n̼	n̪̊	n̪	n̥	n	n̠̊	n̠	ɳ̊	ɳ	ɲ̊	ɲ	ŋ̊	ŋ	ɴ̥	ɴ				
Plosive	p	b	p̪	b̪	t̼	d̼	t̪	d̪	t	d			ʈ	ɖ	c	ɟ	k	ɡ	q	ɢ	ʡ		ʔ	
Sibilant affricate							t̪s̪	d̪z̪	ts	dz	t̠ʃ	d̠ʒ	tʂ	dʐ	tɕ	dʑ								
Non-sibilant affricate	pɸ	bβ	p̪f	b̪v			t̪θ	d̪ð	tɹ̝̊	dɹ̝	t̠ɹ̠̊˔	d̠ɹ̠˔			cç	ɟʝ	kx	ɡɣ	qχ	ɢʁ	ʡʜ	ʡʢ	ʔh	
Sibilant fricative							s̪	z̪	s	z	ʃ	ʒ	ʂ	ʐ	ɕ	ʑ								
Non-sibilant fricative	ɸ	β	f	v	θ̼	ð̼	θ	ð	θ̠	ð̠	ɹ̠̊˔	ɹ̠˔	ɻ̊˔	ɻ˔	ç	ʝ	x	ɣ	χ	ʁ	ħ	ʕ	h	ɦ
Approximant		β̞		ʋ				ð̞		ɹ		ɹ̠		ɻ		j		ɰ						˷
Tap/flap		ⱱ̟		ⱱ					ɾ̥	ɾ			ɽ̊	ɽ						ɢ̆		ʡ̆		
Trill	ʙ̥	ʙ							r̥	r		r̠	ɽ̊r̥	ɽr					ʀ̥	ʀ	ʜ	ʢ		
Lateral affricate									tɬ	dɮ			tꞎ	d𝼅	c𝼆	ɟʎ̝	k𝼄	ɡʟ̝						
Lateral fricative							ɬ̪		ɬ	ɮ			ꞎ	𝼅	𝼆	ʎ̝	𝼄	ʟ̝						
Lateral approximant								l̪	l̥	l		l̠	ɭ̊	ɭ	ʎ̥	ʎ	ʟ̥	ʟ		ʟ̠				
Lateral tap/flap									ɺ̥	ɺ			𝼈̊	𝼈		ʎ̆		ʟ̆						

		BL	LD	D	A	PA	RF	P	V	U
Implosive	Voiced	ɓ			ɗ		ᶑ	ʄ	ɠ	ʛ
Implosive	Voiceless	ɓ̥			ɗ̥		ᶑ̊	ʄ̊	ɠ̊	ʛ̥
Ejective	Stop	pʼ			tʼ		ʈʼ	cʼ	kʼ	qʼ
Ejective	Affricate		p̪fʼ	tθʼ	tsʼ	tʃʼ	tʂʼ	tɕʼ	kxʼ	qχʼ
Ejective	Fricative	ɸʼ	fʼ	θʼ	sʼ	ʃʼ	ʂʼ	ɕʼ	xʼ	χʼ
Ejective	Lateral affricate				tɬʼ			c𝼆ʼ	k𝼄ʼ	q𝼄ʼ
Ejective	Lateral fricative				ɬʼ					
Click (top: velar; bottom: uvular)	Tenuis	kʘ qʘ		kǀ qǀ	kǃ qǃ		k𝼊 q𝼊	kǂ qǂ		
Click (top: velar; bottom: uvular)	Voiced	ɡʘ ɢʘ		ɡǀ ɢǀ	ɡǃ ɢǃ		ɡ𝼊 ɢ𝼊	ɡǂ ɢǂ		
Click (top: velar; bottom: uvular)	Nasal	ŋʘ ɴʘ		ŋǀ ɴǀ	ŋǃ ɴǃ		ŋ𝼊 ɴ𝼊	ŋǂ ɴǂ	ʞ	
Click (top: velar; bottom: uvular)	Tenuis lateral				kǁ qǁ					
Click (top: velar; bottom: uvular)	Voiced lateral				ɡǁ ɢǁ					
Click (top: velar; bottom: uvular)	Nasal lateral				ŋǁ ɴǁ					
