= Northern Catalan =

Dialect of Catalan spoken in Roussillon, France

- Roussillonese
- català septentrional rossellonès
- Native to: France
- Region: Northern Catalonia
- Ethnicity: Catalans
- Language family: Indo-European: Italic; Latino-Faliscan; Romance; Italo-Western; Western Romance; Gallo-Romance; Occitano-Romance; Catalan; Northern Catalan
- Early forms: Proto-Indo-European: Proto-Italic; Old Latin; Vulgar Latin; Proto-Romance; Old Occitan; Old Catalan
- Writing system: Catalan alphabet

Language codes
- ISO 639-3: –
- IETF: ca-FR
- The areas of French Oriental Pyrenees where Catalan is spoken in ■ orange.

Northern Catalan (Catalan: català septentrional), (Note: Catalan pronunciation: [kətəˈla səptəntɾiuˈnal]) also known as Roussillonese (rossellonès), (Note: Catalan pronunciation: [rusəʎuˈnɛs]) is a Catalan dialect mostly spoken in Northern Catalonia (roughly corresponding with the region of Roussillon), but also extending in the northeast part of Southern Catalonia in a transition zone with Central Catalan. All speakers of Catalan from North Catalonia are at least natively bilingual with French.

== Phonology ==
Vowels

Vowels of Northern Catalan
	Front	Central	Back
Close	i (y)		u
Mid	e (ø)	(ə)	o
Open	a		

Notes:

- Northern Catalan has five stressed vowels: /i, e, a, o, u/. In some local varieties /y, ø/ can also be found.
  - Like other Eastern Catalan dialects, unstressed /a/ and /e/ are realized as schwa [ə], and [u] substitutes unstressed /o/.
  - /e, ø, o/ are phonetically true-mid: [e̞, ø̞, o̞] (transcribed here without the diacritic).
- There are some instances of historic stressed /o/ that has changed to /u/: Canigó > Canigú.
- As in the Balearic dialects, final ⟨a⟩ [ə] is not pronounced in words ending with ia if the stress is before the penultimate syllable.

Consonants

Consonants of Northern Catalan
		Labial	Dental/ Alveolar	Palatal	Velar	Uvular
Nasal		m	n	ɲ	ŋ	
Plosive	voiceless	p	t	k		
Plosive	voiced	b	d	ɡ		
Affricate	voiceless		t͡s	t͡ʃ		
Affricate	voiced		d͡z	d͡ʒ		
Fricative	voiceless	f	s	ʃ		
Fricative	voiced		z	ʒ		ʁ
Approximant	median		j	w		ʁ
Approximant	lateral		l	ʎ		
Rhotics	trill					(ʀ)
Rhotics	tap					

Notes:
- In Northern Catalonia, a uvular approximant [ʁ] (or uvular trill [ʀ]) can be heard instead of the alveolar trill (and tap), e.g. córrer [ˈkuʁə] ~ [ˈkuʀə] ('to run').

== Morphology ==
Some subdialects keep the singular masculine definite article lo, as in North-Western Catalan and many varieties of Occitan.

Northern Catalan has a large body of words imported from French and Occitan. It also features some grammatical forms and structures that are typical of Occitan, such as the use of a lone post-verbal pas, rather than a lone preverbal no to express basic negation (Northern Catalan canti pas vs. Central Catalan no canto, 'I don't sing' or 'I'm not singing'); pas is also used in some other Catalan dialects for emphasis but always with no before the verb (Central Catalan no canto pas, 'I do not sing' or 'I am not singing').

== See also ==
- Catalan dialects and varieties
  - Alguerese
  - Balearic
  - Valencian
  - Central Catalan
