= Algherese dialect =

Catalan variant spoken in Alghero, Sardinia, Italy

Algherese
- Alguerese
- alguerés
- Native to: Italy
- Region: Alghero
- Native speakers: 20,000–30,000
- Language family: Indo-European: Italic; Latino-Faliscan; Latin; Romance; Italo-Western; Western Romance; Gallo-Iberian?; Gallo-Romance (Note: Some Iberian scholars may alternatively classify Catalan as Iberian Romance.); Occitano-Romance; Catalan; Eastern; Insular; Algherese
- Early forms: Old Occitan: Old Catalan
- Writing system: Catalan alphabet

Language codes
- ISO 639-3: –
- Glottolog: algh1238
- ELP: Algherese Catalan
- IETF: ca-IT
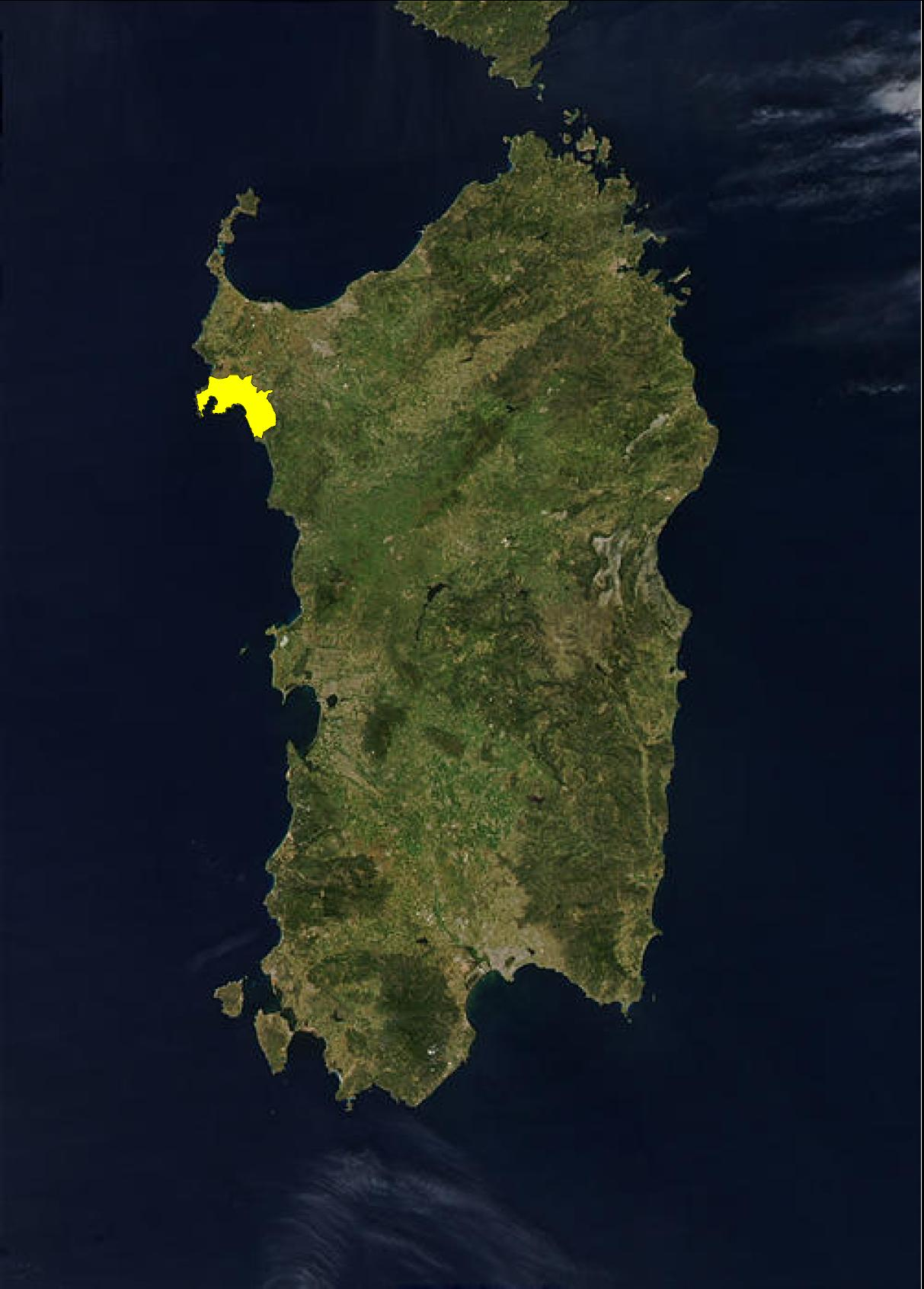
- A satellite photo of the island of Sardinia with the location of the Algherese-speaking area marked in yellow

- Algherese Catalan is classified as Definitely Endangered by the UNESCO Atlas of the World's Languages in Danger.

Algherese or Alguerese (autonym: alguerés) (Note: Pronunciation: [alɣaˈɾes]. Standard Catalan: alguerès [əlɣəˈɾɛs].) is the variety of Catalan spoken in the city of Alghero (L'Alguer in Catalan), in the northwest of Sardinia, Italy.

The dialect has its roots in 1372, when Catalan-speaking colonists were allowed to repopulate Alghero and expel the native population, after several revolts. Catalan was replaced as the official language by Spanish, then by Italian in the mid-18th century. Today the language has semi-official recognition alongside Italian.

Studies give an approximate number of 20,000 to 30,000 native speakers of the language worldwide. In communities where Algherese is spoken, Italian and Logudorese Sardinian are often used as well.

== History ==
Algherese is a regional dialect spoken by anywhere from 20,000 to 30,000 individuals, most of whom reside in the town of Alghero, located in the northwest of Sardinia. The language, though distinct, is initially derived from, and thus considered a variant of, the Catalan language. The origins of the language can be traced back to 1372, when Catalan invaders repopulated the city of Alghero after exiling the indigenous populations in Sardinia. It remained the only language of the city until 1495, when the Edict of Tarazona, which allowed speakers of other languages to return to the city. Despite the city's increasing Italianisation since Sardinia was handed over to the House of Savoy in 1720, the use of this Catalan dialect remained widespread until at least the 1970s.

=== Present status ===
As a result of the city's extensive Italianisation, Italian is now the predominant language in Alghero, being estimated by a 2004 survey to be first language of close to 60% of those surveyed. The use of the language in schools and media, to name a few, remains sparse. Teaching of the language in school is also rare. However, in an attempt to reverse the trend, the Regional Council of Sardinia officially recognised "Algherese Catalan" as a separate language in 1997, in order to promote its use and circulation. According to the 2004 survey, Algherese was used by approximately 14% of the population for daily interactions. The dialect is mostly a local language, often used to supplement Italian and/or Sardinian in relatively small circles.

The following figures were obtained from the Enquesta d'usos lingüístics a l'Alguer ("Survey of linguistic usage in Alghero", EULAL) of 2004 and the Els usos lingüístics a l'Alguer of 2015 (EULA 2015), both of which were studies conducted in the town of Alghero about the general use of Algherese in several media.

Language status
	2004	2015
Oral Comprehension	90.1% (Sardinian oral comprehension: 69.7%)	88.2%
Oral Expression	61.3% (Sardinian oral expression: 33.9%)	50.5%
Written Comprehension	46.6% (Sardinian written comprehension: 35.4%)	35.6%
Written Expression	13.6% (Sardinian written expression: 15.4%)	8.1%
First Language	22.4% (59.2% Italian)	17.5%
Habitual Language	13.9%	9.1%

=== Official recognition ===
In 1999, Catalan and Sardinian were among the twelve minority languages officially recognised as Italy's "historical linguistic minorities" by the Italian State under Law No. 482/1999. Prior to this, the Regional Council of Sardinia had passed the Regional Law No. 26 of 15 October 1997 which, aside from promoting the equality in dignity of the Sardinian language with the Italian language throughout the island, provided that the other languages of smaller scope be afforded the same treatment as the aforementioned languages, among which Catalan is cited, in the city of Alghero. The city council, for its part, promulgated its protection and standardisation in its city statute.

== Phonology ==
Vowels

Vowels of Older Algherese
	Front	Back
Close	i	u
Close-mid	e	o
Open-mid	ɛ	ɔ
Open	a	

Vowels of Modern Algherese
	Front	Back
Close	i	u
Mid	e	o
Open	a	

Notes:
- The close-mid and mid-close vowels /ɛ, e/ and /ɔ, o/ merge into mid vowels ([e̞] and [o̞], here transcribed without diacritics) in Modern Algherese.
- Coalescing of unstressed vowels /a/, /ɛ/ and /e/ to [ä ~ ɐ] (generally transcribed with /a/), similar to the rest of Eastern Catalan, which uses [ə] or even [ɐ]: aura [ˈɑwɾə] or [ˈɑwɾɐ] (Eastern Standard), [ˈɑwɾɐ] (Algherese) 'aura'.
- Unstressed /ɔ, o/ reduces to [ʊ] similar to most Eastern Catalan dialects.
- Unstressed /i/ reduces to [ɪ] similar to most dialects.

Consonants

Consonants of Algherese
		Labial	Dental/ Alveolar	Palatal	Velar
Nasal		m	n	ɲ	(ŋ)
Plosive	voiceless	p	t	k	
Plosive	voiced	b	d	ɡ	
Affricate	voiceless		t͡s	t͡ʃ	
Affricate	voiced		d͡z	d͡ʒ	
Fricative	voiceless	f	s	ʃ	
Fricative	voiced	v	z	ʒ	
Approximant	median		j	w	
Approximant	lateral		l	ʎ	
Rhotics	trill		r		
Rhotics	tap		r		

Notes:
- Algherese preserves /v/ as a distinct phoneme from /b/, like Balearic and most of Valencian: viu ('he/she lives') [ˈviw] (Algherese).
- Mutation of intervocalic /d/ and /l/ to [ɾ]: Barceloneta [bərsəlʊˈnɛtə] or [bɐrsɐlʊˈnɛtɐ] (Eastern Standard), [bɐlsɐɾʊˈne̞tɐ] (Algherese) 'Barcelonette'; and vila ('town') and vida ('life') are homophones in Algherese [ˈviɾɐ]. This phenomenon is known as rhotacism.
- Mutation of syllable final /r/ (or [ɾ]) to lateral [l], and the possible resulting group /r/ + consonant is further simplified to [l]: forn [ˈforn] (Eastern Standard), [ˈfo̞l] (Algherese) 'oven'. This phenomenon is known as lambdacism or lateralization.
- Depalatalisation of syllable final sonorants: lateral /ʎ/ to [l], nasal /ɲ/ to [n]: ball [ˈbaʎ] (Eastern Standard), [ˈbɑl] (Algherese) 'dance'; any [ˈaɲ] (Eastern Standard), [ˈän] (Algherese) 'year'.
- A cacuminal d is found in Sardinian loanwords (e.g., porqueddu [po̞lˈke̞ɖːʊ], Cat. porquet 'piglet').

== Morphology ==
- The simple past is replaced by the present perfect (present of haver "to have" + past participle), possibly by Italian influence.
- The imperfect past preserves etymological -v- in all conjugations: 1st -ava, 2nd -iva, 3rd -iva unlike modern Eastern and Western Standard Catalan, which use 1st -ava, 2nd -ia, 3rd -ia, a feature shared with the Ribagorçan dialect.
- Large-scale lexical borrowing and calques from Sardinian, Spanish and Italian: nearly half of the vocabulary is not from Catalan.

== Differences from Standard Catalan ==
The Algherese variant is Eastern Catalan, but it has many differences from Central Catalan, with some of the most obvious ones as follows:

=== Vocabulary ===
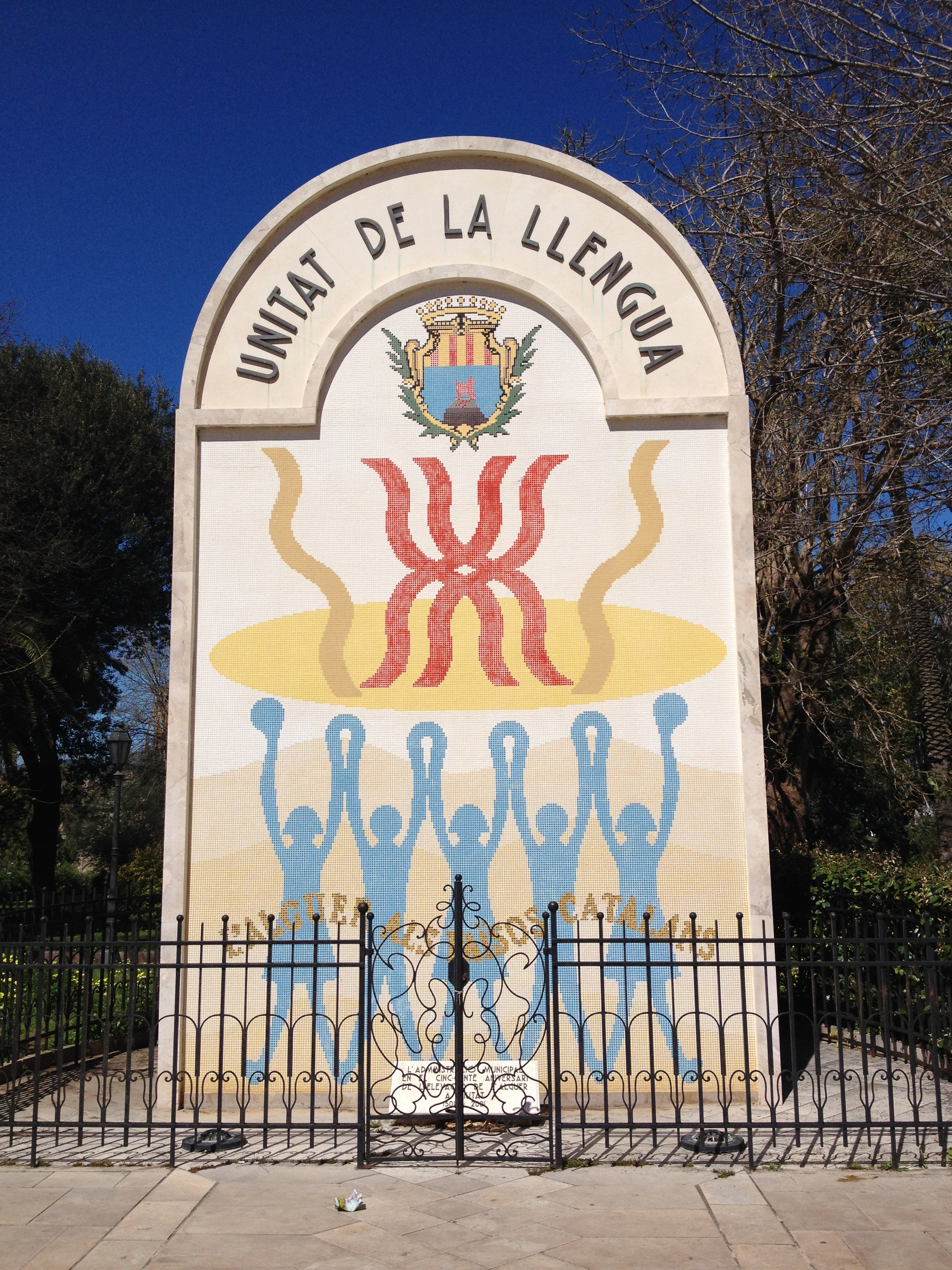
Monument to the unitat de la llengua in Alghero

The following abbreviations are used: m. (masculine), f. (feminine), pl. (plural), f. pl. (feminine plural), inf. (informal), f. (formal).

The following phrases were gathered from a Catalan translation set, but the common phrases in Algherese are similar:

English	Catalan	Algherese
Welcome	Benvingut (m.); Benvinguda (f.) Benvinguts (pl.); Benvingudes (f. pl.)	Benvingut (m.); Benvinguda (f.) Benvinguts (pl.); Benvingudes (f. pl.)
Hello	Hola	Txau
My name is ...	Em dic ...	Me aquirr ... Me dic ...
Where are you from?	D'on ets? (inf.) D'on és vostè? (f.)	De ont ses? (inf.) De ont és vostè? (f.)
Good morning	Bon dia	Bon dia

== Literature ==
Poster for the Premi Rafael Sari 2008

The Premi Rafael Sari, organised by the Obra Cultural de l'Alguer, is a series of prizes awarded in September each year to the best literary works of poetry and prose written in Algherese Catalan.

Notable poets include Rafael Sari, Pasquale Scanu and Maria Chessa Lai. There is also a long tradition of writing and performing songs in Algherese Catalan and the Premi Pino Piras is awarded for new songs written in the language. Notable singer-songwriters include Pino Piras and Franca Masu.

In 2015 Carla Valentino published an Algherese translation of Antoine de Saint-Exupéry's The Little Prince.

== See also ==
- Catalan dialects and varieties
  - Balearic
  - Central Catalan
  - Northern Catalan
  - Valencian

== Sources ==
- "Algherese Catalan". The Endangered Languages Project. 2017. Archived from the original on 9 February 2023.
- Argenter, Joan A. (2008). "L'Alguer (Alghero), a Catalan Linguistic Enclave in Sardinia". International Journal of the Sociology of Language (193/194). doi:10.1515/IJSL.2008.056. S2CID 145104205.
- Ballone, Francesc (2008). "L'Alguer and Alguerese Catalan". Corpus Oral de l'Algueres.
- Cabrera-Callis, Maria (2015). "Morphologically Conditioned Intervocalic Rhotacism in Algherese Catalan" (PDF). Grup d'Estudi de la Variació Dialectal. Servei de Tecnologia Lingüística. Universitat de Barcelona.
- Chessa, Enrico (2011). Another Case of Language Death? The Intergenerational Transmission of Catalan in Alghero (PDF) (PhD thesis). Queen Mary, University of London. Archived from the original (PDF) on 21 October 2013.
- Corbera Pou, Jaume (2000). Caracterització del lèxic alguerès. Palma (Balears): Universitat de les Illes Balears.
- Hammarstrom, Harald; Forkel, Robert; Haspelmath, Martin; Bank, Sebastian (2017). "Dialect: Algherese". Glottolog.
- Marongiu, Antonietta Maria (2007). Language Maintenance and Shift in Sardinia: A Case Study of Sardinian and Italian in Cagliari (PhD thesis). University of Illinois at Urbana-Champaign. hdl:2142/86151.
- Moseley, Christopher (2010). Atlas of the World's Languages in Danger (PDF). UNESCO. ISBN 978-92-3-104096-2.
- Perea, Maria-Pilar (2010). "The Dialect of Alghero: Continuity and Change" ( (PDF)). In Millar, Robert McColl (ed.). Marginal Dialects: Scotland, Ireland and Beyond. Aberdeen: Forum for Research on the Languages of Scotland and Ireland. pp. 131–149. ISBN 978-0-9566549-0-8. Archived from the original on 31 March 2023.
- Perea, Maria-Pilar; Sifre, Manel (2013). "Dialectal Variation in a Nineteenth-Century Catalan Grammar Corpus". Procedia - Social and Behavioral Sciences. 95: 409–417. doi:10.1016/j.sbspro.2013.10.663.
- Recasens Vives, Daniel (1996) [1991], Fonètica descriptiva del català: assaig de caracterització de la pronúncia del vocalisme i el consonantisme català al segle XX, Biblioteca Filològica (in Catalan), vol. 21 (2nd ed.), Barcelona. Spain: Institut d'Estudis Catalans, ISBN 978-84-7283-312-8
- Sanna, Josep (1988). Diccionari català de l'Alguer (1st ed.). L'Alguer: Fundació del II Congrés de la Llengua Catalana. ISBN 8471293919.
- Scala, Luca (2003). Català de l'Alguer. Criteris de llengua escrita (1st ed.). Barcelona: Publicacions de l'Abadia de Montserrat. ISBN 978-84-8415-463-1.
- Tufi, Stefania (2013). "Language Ideology and Language Maintenance: The Case of Sardinia". International Journal of the Sociology of Language (219): 145–160. doi:10.1515/ijsl-2013-0009. S2CID 143748495.
