= Central Catalan =

Dialect of Catalan spoken in eastern Catalonia

Central Catalan (Catalan: català central) (Note: Catalan pronunciation: [kətəˈla sənˈtɾal]) is an Eastern Catalan dialect spoken in the whole province of Barcelona, the eastern half of the province of Tarragona and most of the province of Girona, except for its northern part, where a transition to Northern Catalan begins.

This variety (when free of localisms from Barcelona, Tarragona or Girona) is perceived by most Catalans as the standard form in Catalonia. As such, it is the variety used in most written and audiovisual media, as well as in learning materials.

== Features ==
=== Phonology ===
Vowels

Vowels of Central Catalan
	Front	Central	Back
Close	i		u
Close-mid	e	(ə)	o
Open-mid	ɛ	(ə)	ɔ
Open	a		

Consonants

Consonants of Central Catalan
		Labial	Dental/ Alveolar	Palatal	Velar
Nasal		m	n	ɲ	ŋ
Plosive	voiceless	p	t	k	
Plosive	voiced	b	d	ɡ	
Affricate	voiceless		t͡s	t͡ʃ	
Affricate	voiced		d͡z	d͡ʒ	
Fricative	voiceless	f	s	ʃ	
Fricative	voiced		z	ʒ	
Approximant	median			j	w
Approximant	lateral		l	ʎ	
Tap			ɾ		
Trill			r		

== Subdialects ==
=== Empordanese Catalan ===
In the Empordà region of Catalonia there is a distinctive Empordanese subdialect. As evidenced in writings from the turn of the 19th century by authors such as Joaquim Ruyra, differences between Empordanese and Barcelonese were formerly more pronounced in such areas of usage as the salat definite article (which is still common in Balearic Catalan). In the books of Ruyra there are signs of a clear state of diglossia: the more cultured figures, including the narrator, use the standard Barcelona dialect, whilst the local fishermen employ their own dialect.

Some of the chief differences are:

- hai, fai, vai, etc. for haig, faig, vaig ('I have', 'I make', 'I go', etc.)
- mon, ton, son, etc. for el meu, el teu, el seu, etc. ('mine', 'yours', 'his', etc.) - these variations are not only restricted to the Empordanese Catalan, but are also in use, albeit not often, in Central Catalan and are generally understood by all Central Catalan speakers.
- con and contes for quan/quant and quantes ('when', 'which (m. sing., f. pl.))
- An inversion of the weak forms of the personal pronouns: me, te, se instead of em, et, es ('me', 'you', 'him').
- The use of a 3rd person subjunctive ending in u instead of i: llamp me matu for llamp em mati ('strike me down', lit. "lightning kill me").
- sebre for saber ('to know') with an irregular past participle (sapigut for sabut, 'known').

The Christian colonisation of the Balearics was primarily done with settlers from this region and so both dialects share several similarities, most obviously the use of the salat definite article (practically extinct in Empordanese but still common in Balearic varieties).

In addition, some synonyms are more preferred to their Standard Catalan equivalents, for example capir, capieixo, for entendre, entenc ('to understand', 'I understand') and testa for cap ('head') which share a closer similarity to modern Italian (capire, capisco / testa) than Standard Catalan.

== Text example ==
Excerpt from the Parable of the Prodigal Son extracted from the works of 19th-century linguist Manuel Milà i Fontanals, who wrote extensively about Catalan dialectal differences:

Central Catalan	English
Un home només tenia dos fills. El més jove va dir al seu pare: «Ja és hora que sigui el meu propi amo i que tingui cèntims [diners]; me n'he [me n'haig] d'anar a veure món. Partiu la vostra herència i doneu-me el que em toqui». «Ai, fill meu», va dir el pare, «com vulguis; ets un dolent i Déu et castigarà». I després va obrir un calaix, va partir la seva herència i va fer-ne [en va fer] dues parts. Al cap d'uns quants dies, el dolent se'n va anar del poble molt tibat i sense dir adéu a ningú. Va travessar molta terra ferma, molts boscs i molts rius, i va arribar a una gran ciutat on [a on] va gastar tots els cèntims.	There once was a man with two sons. The younger said to his father: "Now it's time that I follow my own master and that I have money: I have to go out and see the world. Divide your goods and give me that which is my share." "Oh, my son," said his father, "as you wish, you are a bad man and God will punish you." And afterwards he opened a small box, and divided everything he had into two parts. Some days later, the bad young man went away from the village very proudly and without saying goodbye to anyone. He travelled through many desolate lands, many woods and many rivers, and he arrived at a big city where he spent all his money.

== Bibliography ==
- Carbonell Costa, Joan F.; Llisterri Boix, Joaquim (1999), "Catalan", Handbook of the International Phonetic Association: A Guide to the Usage of the International Phonetic Alphabet, Cambridge, UK: Cambridge University Press, pp. 61–65, ISBN 978-0-521-63751-0
- Upper Empordanese Dictionary

== See also ==
- Catalan dialects and varieties
  - Algherese
  - Northern Catalan
  - Balearic
  - Valencian
