= Ridolfino Venuti =

Italian classical archeologist (1705–1763)

Ridolfino Venuti FRS
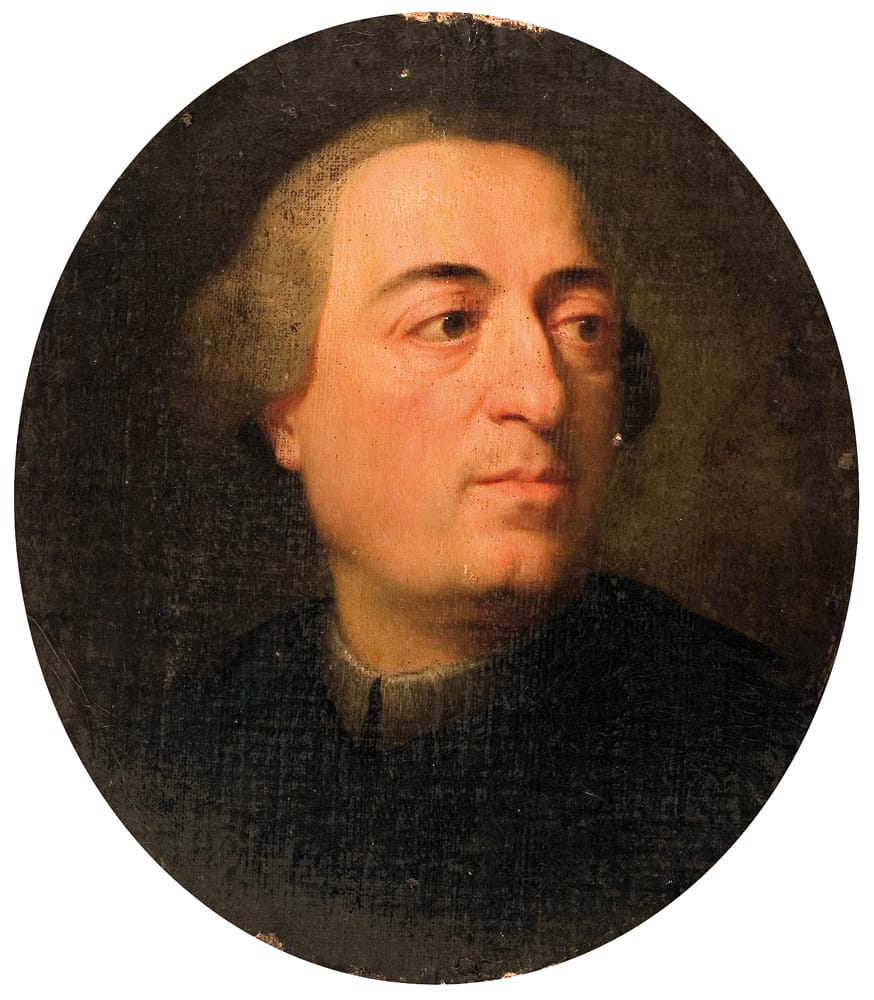
- Contemporary portrait of Ridolfino Venuti
- Born: November , 1705; Cortona, Grand Duchy of Tuscany
- Died: 30 March 1763 (aged 57); Rome, Papal States
- Occupations: Classical scholar, antiquarian and writer
- Parent(s): Giuseppe Venuti and Maria Francesca Venuti (née Baldelli)

Academic background
- Education: Cicognini National Boarding School
- Alma mater: Sapienza University of Rome

Academic work
- Discipline: Classical archaeology; Etruscology

Signature
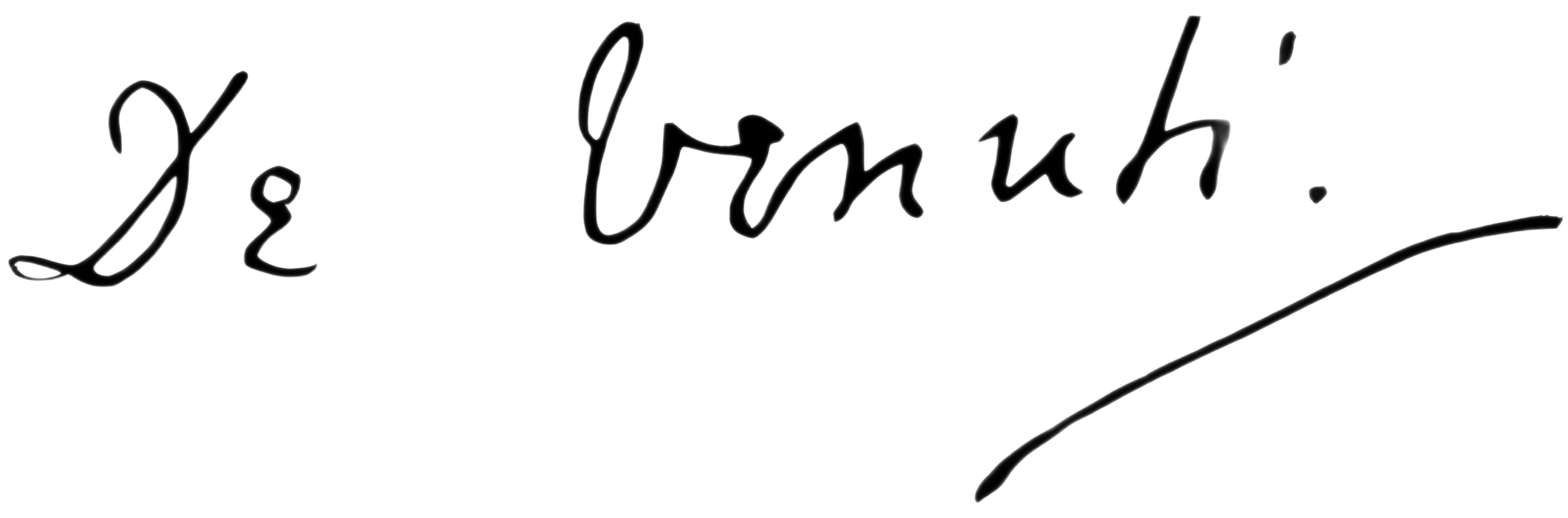

Ridolfino Venuti FRS (Cortona, 1705 – Rome, 1763) was an Italian classical scholar, antiquarian and writer.

== Early life and education ==
Ridolfino Venuti was born in Cortona in November 1705. Together with his brothers Filippo and Niccolò Marcello he was one of the founding fathers of the Etruscan Academy of Cortona. The Academy was a pioneering institution in Europe dedicated to the rediscovery and study of the Etruscan civilization, and included the establishment of a museum to house Etruscan artifacts.

== Career ==
Venuti took his doctorate in civil and canon law in Rome, where he joined the entourage of Cardinal Alessandro Albani; he also began to study Classical art. His Collectanea antiquitatum romanarum (folio, 1736) was the first fruit of his Roman sojourn and of his friendship with other scholars and antiquaries, such as Antonio Francesco Gori, whose pupil he declared himself to be. This work, a catalogue of the collection of Antonio Borioni, was divided into 100 descriptive tables listing the objects represented in 100 corresponding engravings.

Venuti next applied himself to the study of the medals in Cardinal Albani's collection; the resulting catalogue was published in 1739. Venuti pursued his interest in numismatics with a philologist’s passion and rigour, establishing the chronology of each subject and explaining its iconography. He went on to undertake a study of papal coins; about that time Pope Benedict XIV appointed him commissioner for the antiquities of Rome and custodian of the pontifical galleries.

In 1744 Venuti published Numismata romanorum pontificum, a revised and corrected version of an earlier catalogue by Filippo Bonanni; it was arranged chronologically and gave some information about the coiners. In 1750, together with Francesco Valesio and Antonio Francesco Gori, he published the Museum Cortonense, a richly engraved catalogue of the Etruscan archaeological treasures in the Etruscan Academy of Cortona. In 1757 he was elected a member of the Royal Society.

In the following years Venuti undertook the preparation of an extensive guidebook to Rome, published in 1766, and studied the antiquities possessed by the Mattei family in the Villa Celimontana (first volume, 1779). In 1762 his collection of vedute of Italy was published in London in three languages.

In 1763 he published Accurata, e succinta descrizione topografica delle antichità di Roma, an important treatise on the topography of ancient Rome, containing 96 engraved plates including 19 by Giovanni Battista Piranesi. Venuti died in Rome on 30 March 1763. The German scholar Johann Joachim Winckelmann succeeded him as prefect of the antiquities of Rome.

== Writings ==
- Collectanea antiquitatum romanarum (Rome, 1736)
- Numismata maximi moduli … ex museo Alexandri S.R.E. Card. Albani (Rome, 1739)
- Numismata romanorum pontificum (Rome, 1744)
- A Collection of Some of the Finest Prospects in Italy with Short Remarks on them (London, 1762) [text in Eng., Fr. and It.]
- Accurata e succinta descrizione topografica e istorica di Roma moderna (Rome, 1766)
- Monumenta vetera mattheiana, 1 (1779; completed and rev. Giovanni Cristofano Amaduzzi)

== Bibliography ==
- Ducati, Pericle (1937). "VENUTI, Ridolfino". Enciclopedia Italiana. Rome: Istituto dell'Enciclopedia Italiana.
- Monferini, Augusta (1983). "L'ambiente di Ridolfino Venuti". In A. Bettagno (ed.). Piranesi tra Venezia e l'Europa. Florence. pp. 35–44.
- Lorenzi, Giovanna De (1984). "Da Filippo Buonanni a Ridolfino Venuti: Alcune osservazioni sull'interesse per la medaglistica papale nella prima metà del '700". Annuario dell'Accademia Etrusca di Cortona. 21: 151–4.
- D. Gallo: ‘Ridolfino Venuti: Antiquario illuminato’, L’Accademia Etrusca (exh. cat., ed. P. Barocchi and D. Gallo; Cortona, Mus. Accad. Etrus., 1985), pp. 84–93.
- Bruschetti, Paolo (2020). "VENUTI, Ridolfino". Dizionario Biografico degli Italiani (in Italian). Vol. 98: Valeriani–Verra. Rome: Istituto dell'Enciclopedia Italiana. ISBN 978-88-12-00032-6.
