= Banti =

Banti is an Italian surname. It may refer to:

- Anna Banti (1895–1985), Italian writer
- Brigida Banti (1757–1806), Italian soprano
- Luisa Banti (1894–1978), Italian archaeologist
- Luca Banti (born 1974), Italian football referee
- Guido Banti (1852–1925), Italian physician
- Cristiano Banti (1824–1904), Italian painter
- Hervé Banti (born 1977), Monégasque-national Olympic triathlete
- Giorgio Banti (born 1949), Italian linguist

== See also ==
- Séamus McEnaney (born 1967/1968), Irish Gaelic football manager known as "Banty"
