= Mesumundu Archaeological Park =

Archaeological complex located in Sardinia

Coordinates: 40.3510°N 8.4447°E

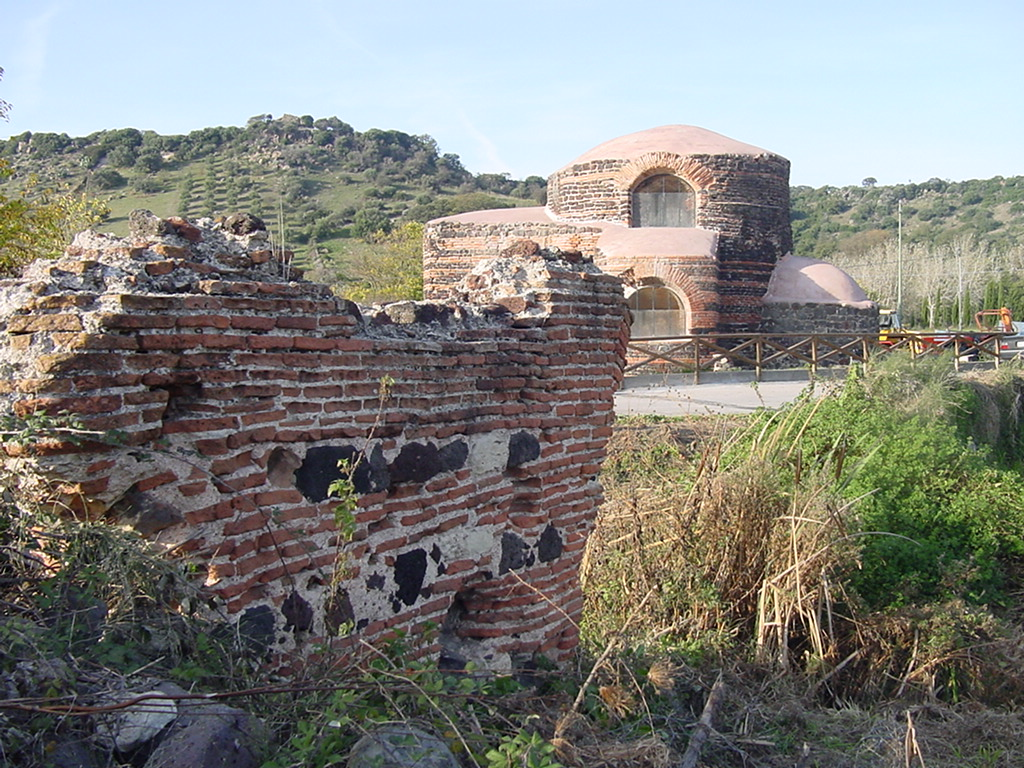
- Ruins at Mesumundu: the remains of the Roman aqueduct and the Mesumundu church in the background
- Interactive map of Mesumundu Archaeological Park
- Type: Village
- Periods: Nuragic civilization
- Cultures: Roman civilization
- Location: Siligo, Sardinia, Italy

Site notes
- Archaeologists: Guglielmo Maetzke, Marco Milanese

The Mesumundu Archaeological Park is an archaeological complex located in Siligo, in the province of Sassari, in Sardinia. Extending for over one hectare, it is located in an alluvial plain bordered by a series of basaltic plateaus, near an ancient path which, already existing in the protohistoric age, was rearranged in the Roman age; it is crossed by the Riu Mannu of Porto Torres.

== Description ==
In the area there are numerous traces belonging to a time span that goes from the pre-Nuragic to the medieval period: in particular the area is characterized by a large area of dispersion of finds of ceramic material, mainly from the Roman era. As for the buildings of the Roman period, part of which should have been Roman Baths, they are mainly made up of ruins, generally reduced to traces of walls and collapsed materials. Among these we note a fragment of the aqueduct that conveyed the thermal waters from the source of S'Abba Uddi into the building, which are at a distance of about 300 m from each other, and the remains of a furnace for the production of bricks. On the basis of the construction technique, the period of installation of the walls, was assumed to be the second or third century. But, after the findings in the area of some fragments of architectural cornices in local stone, a new phase of restructuring of the existing thermal building is also hypothesized, which could be placed between the end of the third and the beginning of the fourth century AD. In the area adjacent to the Church of Nostra Segnora de Mesumundu, there is a necropolis consisting of burials dating back to the 6th–7th century AD. The tombs were excavated under the direction of the archaeologist Guglielmo Maetzke between 1958 and 1965, on that occasion various jewels and weapons were found, which are kept at the Museo nazionale archeologico ed etnografico G. A. Sanna of Sassari.

== Excavations of the 2010s ==
From 2011 to 2018, in the context of the summer schools sponsored by the University of Sassari, 7 archaeological excavation campaigns were carried out in the area, under the direction of the archaeologist Marco Milanese.

In 2015, during the fifth excavation campaign, a late antiquity settlement phase was identified, which can be placed between the abandonment of the Roman baths (3rd A.D.) and the construction of the church (6th A.D.); a well, a long room near the church and the remains of a (...) late antiquity building, with two-floor phases in cocciopesto, located in a neighboring area, not in immediate contiguity with the Byzantine church. It could be the remains of a modest early Christian building, in relation to which numerous burials have been found, referable to a small rural community.

In 2016, during the sixth excavation campaign of the UNISS directed by M. Milanese, it was further confirmed that Mesumundu has been a rural village between the 5th and the 7th sec. A.D..

Furthermore, in 2018, during an excavation, a stretch of paved Roman road dating back to the imperial era was found, which represents one of the rare segments of the Roman road in Sardinia. Depending on the orientation this could be a deviation, a sort of junction, in the direction of Ardara (and therefore of Olbia), which detached from the main axis of the Roman road network of Sardinia, which connected (Carales) Cagliari and (Turris Lybisonis) Porto Torres.

== See also ==
- Nostra Segnora de Mesumundu
