= Etruscology =

Study of the ancient Etruscan civilization

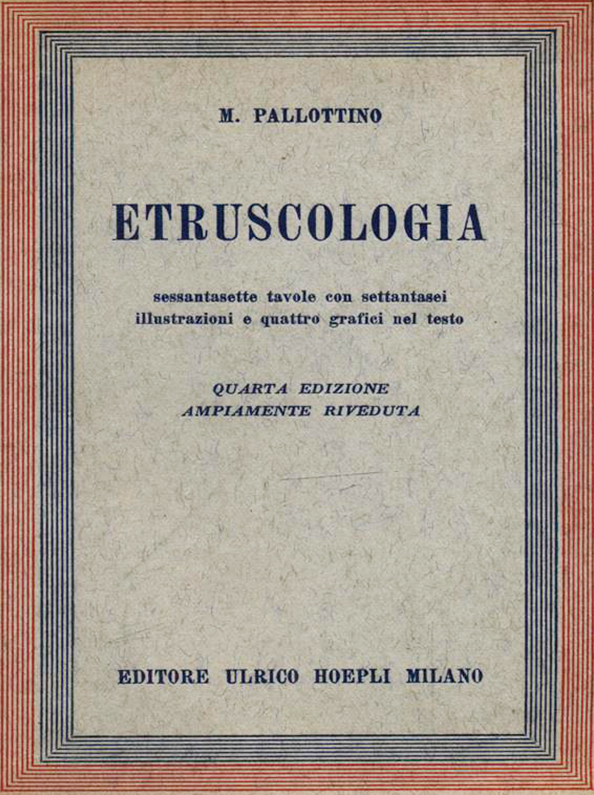
Cover of the 4th edition of "Etruscologia" by Massimo Pallottino

Etruscology is the study of the ancient civilization of the Etruscans in Italy (Etruria), which was incorporated into an expanding Roman Empire during the period of Rome's Middle Republic. Since the Etruscans were politically and culturally influential until the early Roman Republic, many Etruscologists are also scholars of the history, archaeology, and culture of Rome.

The premier scholarly journal of Etruscan Studies is Studi Etruschi. A recent addition to the scholarly literature is the American journal, Etruscan Studies: Journal of the Etruscan Foundation, which began publication on January 1, 1994, with two issues produced per annum. The journal Etruscan Studies adopted a new name in 2017, becoming Etruscan & Italic Studies: Journal of the Etruscan Foundation. A more informal organ is Etruscan News and the accompanying cyber-publication Etruscan News Online.

Thomas Dempster (1570–1625), Scottish scholar and historian, is perhaps the godfather of Etruscology. Under the patronage of Grand Duke Cosimo II of Etruria, Dempster researched and wrote De Etruria Regali Libri Septem (from Latin: The Seven Books of Royal Etruria). Dempster's work was published posthumously in 1723 by Filippo Buonarroti. De Etruria Regali sparked a renewed interest in Etruscan history that spread throughout Italy. Amgong the leading Etruscologist of the period are Mario Guarnacci, Antonio Francesco Gori, Giovanni Maria Lampredi, Giovanni Lami and Luigi Lanzi.

Prominent Etruscologists, past and present, include Pericle Ducati, Elizabeth Caroline Gray, Adile Ayda, Ranuccio Bianchi Bandinelli, Massimo Pallottino, Mauro Cristofani, Giovanni Colonna, Giulio Giglioli, Giovannangelo Camporeale, Jacques Heurgon, Dominique Briquel, Carlo De Simone, Helmut Rix, L. Bouke van der Meer, George Dennis, Guglielmo Maetzke, Nancy T. DeGrummond, Sybille Haynes, and Larissa Bonfante. Other scholars who focus more on the Etruscan influence on Rome include R. E. A. Palmer, John F. Hall, and H. H. Scullard.

Various organizations promote Etruscology. The Etruscan Foundation supports Etruscan scholarship in the United States and abroad. The foundation provides internships and fellowships, and publishes the journal Etruscan Studies. It also sponsors an annual lecture.
