= Bombing of Padua in World War II =

Bombing of Padua
- Part of World War II
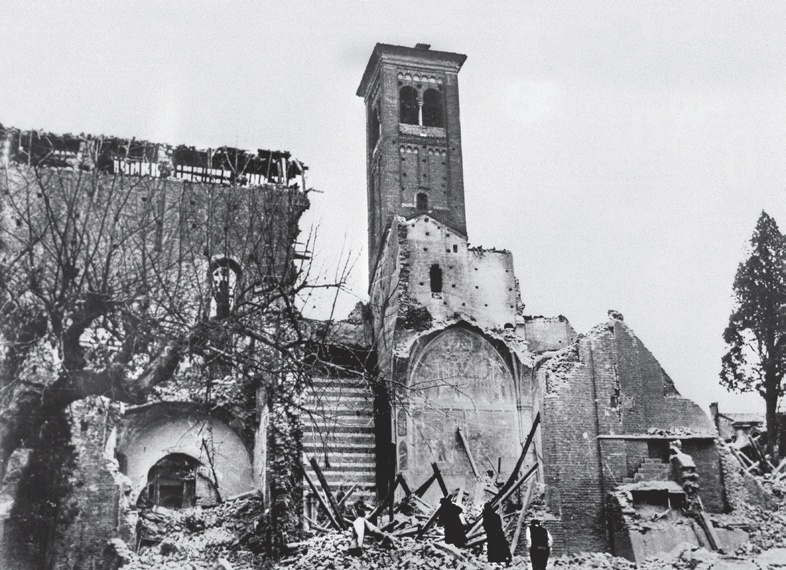
- Damage to the Church of the Eremitani
Date	December 1943 – April 1945
Location	Padua, Italy

Belligerents
United States; United Kingdom	Italian Social Republic

The bombing of Padua was a series of attacks by the United States Army Air Force and the Royal Air Force on the Italian city of Padua, Veneto, during World War II. These raids were aimed at disabling Padua's marshalling yard, but also resulted in heavy damage to the city and civilian casualties.

== Chronology of main air raids ==
=== 16 December 1943 ===
First air raid on Padua. In two attacks, the first one at ten in the morning and the second one at 1:00 P.M., seventy-two bombers of the 15th Air Force attacked the marshalling yard, but many of the 200 tons of bombs dropped in these attacks fell on the city, and especially on the Arcella district (hit by over 400 bombs); the Temple of Peace and the churches of San Carlo, Dimesse and Santissima Trinità suffered damage, as did the University and the Da Monte Sanatorium. A passenger train that had just arrived from Venice was hit by several bombs, causing dozens of victims. Another raid was carried out during the following night, hitting an air raid shelter near Porta Trento and causing further deaths. Altogether, these three raids caused three hundred victims, two-thirds of whom in the Arcella district.

=== 30 December 1943 ===
Second raid by seventy bombers of the 15th Air Force, targeting the marshalling yard. Part of the bombs fell on the city, hitting again the Arcella district, the Temple of Peace (where the remains of the fallen in World War I were scattered all over the church), the University, the main hospital and the old Paolotti jail. About three hundred people were killed.

=== 7 February 1944 ===
Night raid by 45 bombers of the Royal Air Force, which dropped 72 tons of bombs, targeting the marshalling yard; the bombs fell all over the city and caused about three hundred civilian deaths, two-thirds of which in an air raid shelter below the Impossibile Tower of the city walls, struck by a bomb.

=== 11 March 1944 ===
Raid by 111 Boeing B-17 bombers of the 15th Air Force, targeting the marshalling yard; over three hundred tons of bombs were dropped. The city was hit as well; among other buildings, the Church of the Eremitani was badly damaged, resulting in the near-total destruction of the frescoes of the Ovetari Chapel, one of the heaviest losses caused by the war to Italy’s cultural heritage. The church of San Benedetto Vecchio was partially destroyed; the military barracks of the Riviera Paleocapa were hit, with severe casualties among the military personnel quartered there, and damage was suffered by the Impero Cinema, the African Missions Institute, the hospital and the "La Salutare" nursing home. The Arcella district suffered once again heavy damage. Fighter planes of the Aeronautica Nazionale Repubblicana and the Luftwaffe shot down two bombers and seriously damaged another seven, while suffering the loss of four aircraft.

=== 22 March 1944 ===
Night raid by 82 bombers of the Royal Air Force, targeting the marshalling yard; the “Garden City” district was particularly hit hard. Among the badly damaged buildings were the Cathedral, the Monumental Cemetery, the church of San Giuseppe, the "Villa Frida" nursing home, the psychiatric hospital, the Belzoni Institute and the aqueduct; the Arcella district was by then almost completely razed (out of 8,500 inhabitants, only about fifty were still living there, the rest having fled).

=== 23 March 1944 ===
Night raid by 49 RAF bombers, once again targeting the marshalling yard. Bombs hit the Loggia del Consiglio, Palazzo della Ragione, Palazzo Liviano, Palazzo delle Debite, the church of the Cappuccini, the Scuola del Carmine (where several 15th century frescoes were lost), Piazza Petrarca, the Garden City, the Seminary, the Basilica of Saint Anthony.

=== 20 April 1944 ===
Raid by the 15th Air Force, targeting the marshalling yard. Many bombs fell on the city, especially the Terranegra district, causing 180 victims among the population (many of whom in a tavern where many had gathered after the air raid alarm, and on the banks of the Roncajette canal, where many inhabitants had sought shelter).

=== 14 May 1944 ===
Raid on the marshalling yard by a hundred B-17 bombers of the 15th Air Force, during the morning; about 500 bombs were dropped. The Church of the Cappuccini was almost completely destroyed; bombs also hit the school of the Voltbarozzo district, killing ten people, and the institute run by the nuns of Saint Francis of Sales.

=== 1 September 1944 ===
Air raid on the suburbs, Ponte di Brenta and Pontevigodarzere, targeting the road and railway bridges; a dozen homes were destroyed and an air raid shelter was hit as well, killing many of its occupants.

=== 22 February 1945 ===
Night raid by 69 RAF bombers, targeting the marshalling yard. The bomb hit the Bassanello and Arcella districts, and the area around Piazza Mazzini.

=== 24 February 1945 ===
Raid by the 15th Air Force, targeting the marshalling yard.

=== 2 March 1945 ===
Raid by the 15th Air Force, again targeting the marshalling yard.

=== 12 March 1945 ===
Night raid by sixty-nine bombers of the Royal Air Force, targeting the marshalling yard. Bombs hit Porta San Giovanni, the Public Gardens, the church of San Benedetto, the Temple of Peace, the Loggetta del Salone and many residential buildings.

Smaller-scale raids continued until 23 April 1945.

== Damage and casualties ==
The raids caused heavy damage to the city; 950 homes were completely destroyed, a further 1,400 were damaged. In the Arcella district, which suffered the heaviest damage, only 4% of all buildings survived; other badly damaged districts included Ponte di Brenta, Pontevigodarzere and Campo di Marte.

Cultural heritage suffered heavy damage; among historical buildings that suffered serious damage were the Cathedral, the Baptistery, the Basilica of Saint Anthony, the churches of the Eremitani, the Dimesse, San Benedetto Vecchio and the Cappuccini, Palazzo delle Debite, Palazzo della Ragione and Palazzo Liviano, the Loggia del Consiglio and the Scuola del Carmine. The greatest loss was that of Andrea Mantegna’s frescoes in the church of the Eremitani, considered by the Treccani Encyclopedia as "the greatest loss caused by the war in the field of visual arts".

Losses among the civilian population amounted to two thousands dead; the remains of 989 of them are now buried in the Temple of Peace, along with the fallen of World War I. The Arcella district alone suffered 400 deaths and 500 wounded.
