= Giovanni Becatti =

Italian classical art historian and archaeologist (1912–1973)

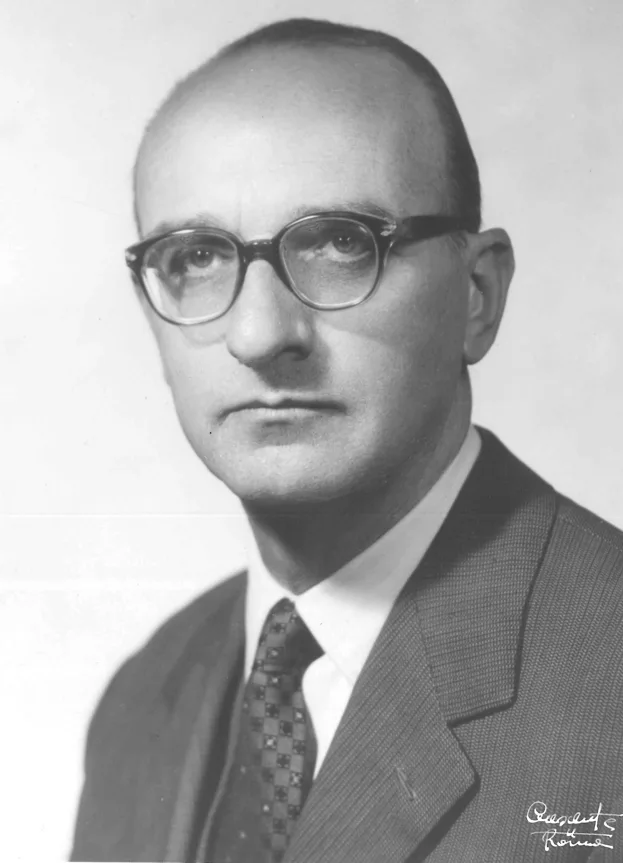
Giovanni Becatti

Giovanni Becatti (5 December 1912 – 10 April 1973) was an Italian Classical art historian and archaeologist.

Born at Siena, Becatti was educated at the University of Rome under Giulio Giglioli. Becatti was appointed to the Superintendency of Ostia in 1938. He was professor of Archeology and History of Classical Art at the University of Pisa (1941–1944) and at the University La Sapienza of Rome (1945–1946).

From 1947 to 1950, he was Director of the excavations of Ostia Antica. Then Becatti moved to chair the department at the University of Milan from 1952 to 1956, in Florence from 1957 to 1964 and the University of Rome from 1964 to his premature death in 1973.

Becatti continued to publish on and excavate Ostia throughout his career. He altered his publishing interests from Etruscan subjects to Ancient Greek and Roman Art.

He was the editor of the prestigious Enciclopedia dell’Arte Antica (1958–1966), with and after Bianchi Bandinelli. He was a visiting professor in the United States at Princeton University (1963–1964) and the University of Chicago (1969). He received the title of "Doctor Honoris Causa" from the University of Louvain (1969).

He was member of the Accademia Nazionale dei Lincei, of the Pontificia Accademia romana di Archeologia, of the Accademia della Arti del Disegno, of the Istituto di Studi etruschi e di Studi romani.

== Bibliography ==
- [collected articles:] Kosmos, studi sul mondo classico. Rome: Bretschneider, 1987
- L'arte dell'età classica. Florence: Sansoni, 1971, (English ed.: The Art of Ancient Greece and Rome: from the Rise of Greece to the Fall of Rome. London: Thames and Hudson, 1968
- L'arte romana. Milan: Garzanti, 1962
- La colonna coclide istoriata; problemi storici, iconografici, stilistici. Studi e materiali del Museo dell'Impero romano 6. Rome: Bretschneider, 1960
- Arte e gusto negli scrittori latini, 1946
- Il Maestro di Olimpia, 1943
- Meidias: un manierista antico. Florence: Sansoni,1947
- Oreficerie antiche dalle minoiche alle barbariche. Rome: Istituto poligrafico dello Stato, 1955
- Corpus vasorum antiquorum. Italia. Musei comunali umbri. Rome: Libreria dello Stato, 1940.
- Scavi di Ostia Antica:
  - I,Topografia,1954
  - II,Mitrei,1954
  - IV,Mosaici,1962
  - VI,Edificio con Opus Sectile fuori Porta Marina,1969
