= Luisa Banti =

Italian archaeologist and Etruscan scholar

- Born: July 13, 1894; Florence, Italy
- Died: February 17, 1978 (aged 83); Rome, Italy
- Education: University of Florence
- Known for: Etruscology

Luisa Banti (1894 – 1978) was an Italian archaeologist, art historian, and educator specializing in the Etruscan and Minoan civilizations. Her best known work is Il mondo degli Etruschi (The World of the Etruscans). First published in 1960 and translated into several languages, it influenced scholarly opinion for many years and became a classic text.

== Early life and education ==
Luisa Banti was born into a well-to-do family in Florence in 1894, the oldest of six children. Her father, Guido Banti, was a prominent physician and Professor of Pathology at the University of Florence. Having inherited her father's propensity for analytical research, she defied expectations for women of her day by enrolling in the University of Florence when she was in her thirties, to study philology and classical antiquity. She wrote her doctoral dissertation on the Luni site and her post-doctoral thesis on the cult of the dead in archaic Rome. Among her professors were Giacomo Devoto, who introduced her to Etruscology, and Luigi Pernier, who trained her in Etruscan archaeology.

== Career ==
Banti's earliest published research papers were on historical topography. In the 1930s she spent summers with the Italian Archaeological Mission at Crete, where she organized and wrote about artifacts discovered earlier at Festos and Haghia Triada. After publishing several articles on Minoan religion, she was appointed to the History of Religions Department at the University of Rome. In the 1940s she also served as editorial assistant for the journal Bolletino d'Arte, and wrote book reviews for Studi Etruschi and Athenaeum.

Banti chaired the Department of Archaeology and History of Greek and Roman Art at the University of Pavia from 1948 to 1950, and the Department of Etruscan Studies and Italic Archaeology at the University of Florence from 1950 to 1965. During this period, she also lectured at American universities, including Columbia and Princeton. From 1965 to 1972 she presided over L'Istituto di Studi Etruschi (the Institute for Etruscan Studies).

In 1960, Banti published the first edition of what would become her best known work, Il mondo degli Etruschi (The World of the Etruscans). A second edition was published in 1968, and the first English translation, The Etruscan Cities and Their Culture, was published by the University of California in 1973. Although primarily a technical archaeological report, the book provided the best overview of Etruscan art available at the time. It influenced scholarly opinion for many years and became a classic text.

Banti spent her final years at the American Academy in Rome studying the villa at Hagia Triada. She died in 1978, bequeathing her library of some 930 volumes to the University of Florence.

== Publications ==
Italian:

- "Culto dei morti nella Roma antichissima", Studi italiani di filologia classica, VII, 1929
- Luni, 1937
- I culti minoici e greci di Haghia Triada (Creta), 1941
- Il palazzo minoico di Festo, 1951
- "Problemi della pittura arcaica etrusca: la tomba dei Tori a Tarquinia" in Studi etruschi, vol. XXIV, 1955–1956
- Il mondo degli Etruschi, 1960
- F. Halbherr, E. Stefani, L. Banti, "Haghia Triada nel periodo tardo palaziale" in Annuario della Scuola archeologica italiana di Atene, LV [1977], p. 13.

English:

- The Etruscan Cities and Their Culture. Translated by Bizzari, Erika. University of California Press. 1973. ISBN 9780520019102.
