= Mauro Cristofani =

Italian linguist and researcher in Etruscan studies

Mauro Cristofani (1941 in Rome, Italy – 1997) was a linguist and researcher in Etruscan studies.

== Biography ==
Cristofani was a student of Massimo Pallottino and would himself teach at the University of Pisa, University of Siena and, his final post, at the University of Naples Federico II. He was a member of the Accademia Nazionale dei Lincei and was held in high regard as Pallottino's scholarly heir. During his thirty-year career, he dominated the fields of Etruscan archaeology and, especially, epigraphy. He directed the Istituto per l'Archeologia Etrusco-Italica of the Consiglio Nazionale delle Ricerche and was president of the Istituto Nazionale di Studi Etruschi ed Italici in Florence.

His fieldwork included investigations at Volterra, Populonia, and Cerveteri. In Italy, the Consiglio Nazionale delle Ricerche established the “Centro per l'archeologia etrusco-italica” in 1978, under the direction of Massimo Pallottino. In 1982, Cristofani (a student of Pallottino) became the director of the Center, which in 1990 became the Institute for Etruscan-Italic Archaeology.

In 2001 Cristofani's career was honoured by the presentation of 3 volumes that compiled articles he published between 1966 and 1997 under the title Scripta Selecta: trenta anni di studi archeologici sull'Italia preromana, edited by Antonio Giuliano, Salvatore Settis, and Fausto Zevi.

== Bibliography ==
- Le tombe da Monte Michele nel Museo archeologico di Firenze. (Florence, L.S. Olschki, 1969).
- ed. Atti del Colloquio sul tema Le ricerche epigrafiche e linguistiche sull’etrusco. Problemi, prospettive, programmi. (Firenze, 28-30 settembre 1969). (Firenze, L. S. Olschki, 1973).
- Statue-cinerario chiusine di età classica (Rome, 1975).
- ed. Caratteri dell’ellenismo nelle urne etrusche: atti dell’incontro di studi: Università di Siena, 28-30 aprile 1976 (Florence, 1977).
- Materiali per servire alla storia del Vaso François (Rome: Istituto poligrafico e zecca dello stato, 1981).
- L’arte degli etruschi: produzione e consumo (Turin, 1978).
- et al. Gli Etruschi in Maremma: popolamento e attività produttive (1981).
- La scoperta degli etruschi: archeologia e antiquaria nel ’700 (Rome: Consiglio nazionale delle ricerche, 1983).
- ed. Gli Etruschi: una nuova immagine (Florence: Giunti Martello, 1984).
- ed. Dizionario della civiltà etrusca (Florence: Giunti Martello, 1985).
- I bronzi degli Etruschi (Novara, 1985).
- ed. Il Commercio etrusco arcaico: atti dell’incontro di studio, 5-7 dicembre, 1983 (Rome: Consiglio nazionale delle ricerche, 1985).
- ed. Civiltà degli Etruschi (Milan: Electa, 1985).
- Saggi di storia etrusca arcaica (Rome: G. Bretschneider, 1987).
- ed. Etruria e Lazio arcaico : atti dell’incontro di studio, 10-11 novembre 1986 (Rome: Consiglio nazionale delle ricerche, 1987).
- Gli Etruschi del Mare (Milan, 1983; 2nd ed. 1989).
- ed. Caere series (Rome: Consiglio nazionale delle ricerche, 1988-)
- ed. Miscellanea ceretana (Rome: Consiglio nazionale delle ricerche, 1989).
- La Grande Roma dei Tarquini : Roma, Palazzo delle esposizioni, 12 giugno-30 settembre 1990 / catalogo della mostra a cura di Mauro Cristofani (Rome, 1990).
- Introduzione allo studio dell'etrusco (Florence, 1991).
- Cerveteri : tre itinerari archeologici (Rome, 1991).
- ed. Lo Scarico arcaico della vigna parrocchiale (Rome: Consiglio nazionale delle ricerche, 1992-).
- Miscellanea etrusco-italica 3 vol. (Rome, 1993-2003).
- Tabula Capuana: un calendario festivo di età arcaica (Florence, 1995).
- Etruschi e altre genti nell’Italia preromana: mobilità in età arcaica (Rome: G. Bretschneider, 1996).
- Due testi dell’Italia preromana (Rome, 1996).
- Scripta selecta: trenta anni di studi archeologici sull'Italia preromana 3 vol. (Pisa, 2001).
- Vigna parrocchiale : scavi 1983-1989: il santuario, la "residenza" e l’edificio ellittico; presentazione di Adriano Maggiani; testi di Vincenzo Bellelli et al. Caere; 4 (Rome: Consiglio nazionale delle ricerche, 2003).
