= Tarquitius Priscus =

Tarquitius Priscus (1st century BC or early 1st century AD) was a Roman writer of Etruscan heritage, known for works on the etrusca disciplina, the body of knowledge pertaining to Etruscan religion and cosmology.

== Identity ==
References from the time suggest that Tarquitius Priscus lived in the late Roman Republic or during the reign of Augustus, the first Roman emperor. He has been conjecturally identified as either the Gaius Tarquitius Priscus who served under Sertorius in the 80s BC, or a son or grandson of the Tarquitius Priscus who was his legate in 72 BC. The scholar Varro (116–27 BC) seems to have known him.

Inscriptions show a gens Tarquitia in the Etruscan areas of Caere and Veii. The gens name Tarquitius is related to Tarquinius, the name of the Etruscan kings of Rome.

== Works and influence ==
Tarquitius Priscus wrote at least two ostentaria, a form of arcane literature that collected, described, and interpreted signs (ostenta), including an ostentarium arborarium, a book on signs pertaining to trees, (Note: Macrobius, Saturnalia 3.20.3 (in Latin).) and an ostentarium Tuscum, which may have been translated from Etruscan. He translated, or perhaps transcribed, the prophecies of Vegoia, which were kept in the archives of the Palatine Apollo; one fragment of this work attributed to Tarquitius survives. Tarquitius has been regarded as the probable author of a conjectural bilingual Etrusco-Latin version of Etruscan writings that would have been in use by Latin authors ranging from Lucretius in the 1st century BC through Johannes Lydus (6th century AD) and perhaps Isidore of Seville (d. 636 AD).

Based on the two preserved fragments, Tarquitius appears to have written in prose, but because a clausula can be scanned as a trimeter at the end of one, verse composition is not impossible. Bormann proposed that Tarquitius wrote in verse forms such as senarii; Ovid mentions a Priscus and Catalepton 5 a Tarquitius in the company of verse writers.

Pliny names Tarquitius as a source for the second book of his Natural History and associates him with Aulus Caecina, who also wrote on Etruscan religion and who lived in the time of Julius Caesar. As one indication that his books were still being used in late antiquity, the haruspices consulted Tarquitius under the title De rebus divinis ("On Divine Matters") before the battle that proved fatal to the emperor Julian — because he failed to heed them, according to Ammianus Marcellinus. (Note: Ammianus Marcellinus 25.27: Ex Tarquitianis libris in titulo de rebus divinis.) Ammianus mentions comets as one topic in the works of Tarquitius.

Macrobius quotes Tarquitius twice, and these quotations are the only direct examples of his writings. (Note: Macrobius, 3.7.2: Purpureo aureove colore ovis ariesve si aspergetur, principi ordinis et generis summa cum felicitate largitatem auget, genus progeniem propagat in claritate laetioremque efficit.) In one instance, Macrobius elucidates a portent that Vergil includes in his "Golden Age" eclogue (Eclogue 4) by quoting the Ostentarium Tusco of Tarquitius: "if the fleece of a ram or a sheep is spattered with gold or purple, it portends good fortune to the leader."

== Sources ==
- Grummond, Nancy Thomson de (2006). "Introduction: The History of the Study of Etruscan Religion". The Religion of the Etruscans. University of Texas Press. pp. 1–8.
- Guittard, Charles (2012). "Etrusca Disciplina: How Was It Possible to Learn about Etruscan Religion in Ancient Rome?". In Tanaseanu-Döbler, Ilinca; Döbler, Marvin (eds.). Religious Education in Pre-Modern Europe. Brill. pp. 63–76.
- Hall, John F. (1996). "Etruscan Italy: A Rediscoverable History?". Etruscan Italy; Etruscan Influences on the Civilizations of Italy from Antiquity to the Modern Era. Brigham Young University. pp. 241–266.
- Linderski, Jerzy (1985). "The libri reconditi". Harvard Studies in Classical Philology. 89: 207–234. doi:10.2307/311276. JSTOR 311276.
- Macfarlane, Roger T. (1996). "Tyrrhena Regum Progenies: Etruscan Literary Figures from Horace to Ovid". In Hall, John F. (ed.). Etruscan Italy; Etruscan Influences on the Civilizations of Italy from Antiquity to the Modern Era. Brigham Young University. pp. 241–266.
- Turfa, Jean MacIntosh (2012). Divining the Etruscan World: The Brontoscopic Calendar and Religious Practice. Cambridge University Press.
