= Carlo Anti =

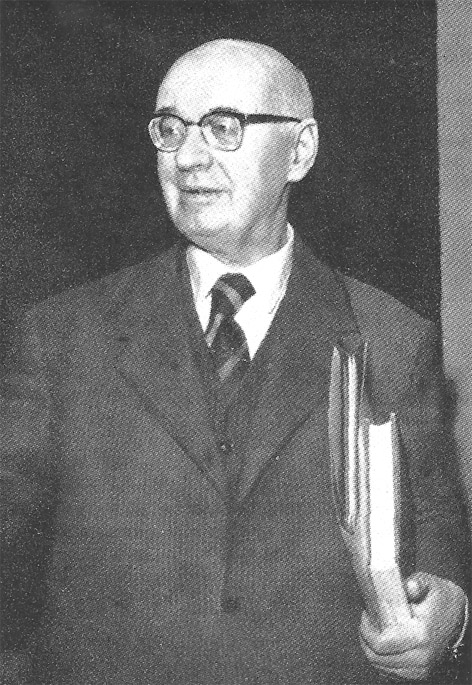
Carlo Anti

Carlo Anti (28 April 1889 – 9 June 1961) was an Italian archaeologist and an officer in the army in the First World War and until 1922.

== Archaeologist ==
Born in Villafranca di Verona, Anti studied at Verona and Bologna, where he graduated with Gherardo Ghirardini. Thereafter he transferred to Rome to study at the Italian Archaeological School and then to be an inspector at the Pigorini National Museum of Prehistory and Ethnography. During his years studying in Rome he married his wife, Clelia Vinciguerra, also a cum at the school. Among his teachers at this time, he remembered Emanuel Löwy, a great Austrian archaeologist active in Rome during those years, who supported him in developing his interest in the history of artists, already stimulated by his contact with the school of Monaco and opposed to the Art history founded by Johann Joachim Winckelmann.

In 1914 he travelled for the first time to Greece, where he had the opportunity to meet Italian and foreign scholars, including Luigi Pernier, Biagio Pace, Wilhelm Dörpfeld and Panagiotis Kavvadias.

In 1921 he was invited to Anatolia by Amedeo Maiuri and Roberto Paribeni with the task of exploring Lycia and Pamphylia, as part of vague Italian attempts to establish a presence in Turkey.

From 1922, his archaeological and scholarly activities were linked to the University of Padua. In the same year, he curated the exhibition of 33 African objects at the Pigorini Museum and the Ethnographic Museum of Florence for the 13th Venetian Biennial.

From 1925 to 1936 he performed the role of assistance to Luigi Pernier at the excavations of the Sanctuary of Apollo at Cyrene. At Cyrene, Anti was entrusted with the study of the material, while Pernier was responsible for the excavation. In 1930, the excavation of Umm el Breighat (ancient Tebtunis), in the Egyptian desert, followed.

During the period of his rectorate (1932-1938), Carlo Anti's activities in the archaeological field became fewer, but by 1943 he had returned to dedicating himself to study. Anti was subject to a purge and was removed from the university, but in the following year he returned to teaching, which he continued to do until he retired in 1959.

== Rector ==
Already a professor at the University of Padua, he was named Magnifico rettore (Rector) in 1932.

During the eleven years in which he held the position of Rector at the University of Padua, Anti dedicated himself to the renovation and modernisation of the university buildings and its research facilities, thanks to the investment of 45 million lire in 1932, to which a further 12 million was added in 1938, giving the academy "an organic and unified built environment." New buildings incorporated among the old ones, included the student house "Prince of Piedmont" (1935) and the Palazzo Liviano (1940), which is the location of the Faculty of Literature and Philosophy to this day. Carlo Anti's interest in the history and origins of the institution caused him to found a Library of the Rectorate as well.

He was replaced in the position of rector by Concetto Marchesi, in light of the changing political conditions in Italy. Although he was a political adversary of him, Marchesi did not fail to stress the importance of the scholarly work of Carlo Anti, regretting that he was for a time distracted by the obligations of administration, on the occasion of the award of the national prize of the Lincei for his volume, Teatri greci arcaici, in 1949.

== Fascist ==
In his autobiography, Norberto Bobbio called Carlo Anti "the rector, famous archaeologist, and complete and utter fascist". At the time, Bobbio was teaching Philosophy of law at the University of Padua.

Both the expensive building programme (1932-1938) of renovations to the academy which Anti carried out with great energy and his interest in the sporting activities of the youth were characteristic of the fascist period. According to Luigi Polacco, "it is necessary to recognise in Carlo Anti a certain naivete, when we find in the documents an account of misplaced trust given to these organisations and the kind of generous optimism with which he interpreted their work."

In favour of the racial laws of 1938, Anti made himself their implementer at the University of Padua, with the lapse of support for all Jewish teachers, in a letter "free... of the normal greetings.". At the same time, Anti commissioned the Jew, Massimo Campigli, for the frescoes of the Faculty of Literature, and appointed the Latinist Concetto Marchesi, noted politically as an anti-fascist, to a teaching position. Marchesi succeeded Anti in the position of Rector in 1943.

On 16 December 1943, he was nominated by the Council of Ministers of the Italian Social Republic to the Directorate General of the Arts, and appointed as the Director General. In this role, he dedicated himself to opposing the Nazi Party's deportation of Italian works of art to Germany.

== Works ==
One of his more important works was the volume Teatri greci arcaici (Archaic Greek Theatres) of 1947, for which he was awarded the national prize of the Lincei in 1949 despite the great controversy deriving from continuing political aversion to the Fascist period.

=== Other works ===
- Monumenti policletei (Monuments of Polykleitos), in «Monumenti antichi dei Lincei», XXVI (1921), col. 501 ss.
