= Nostra Segnora de Mesumundu =

Coordinates: 40.3510°N 8.4447°E

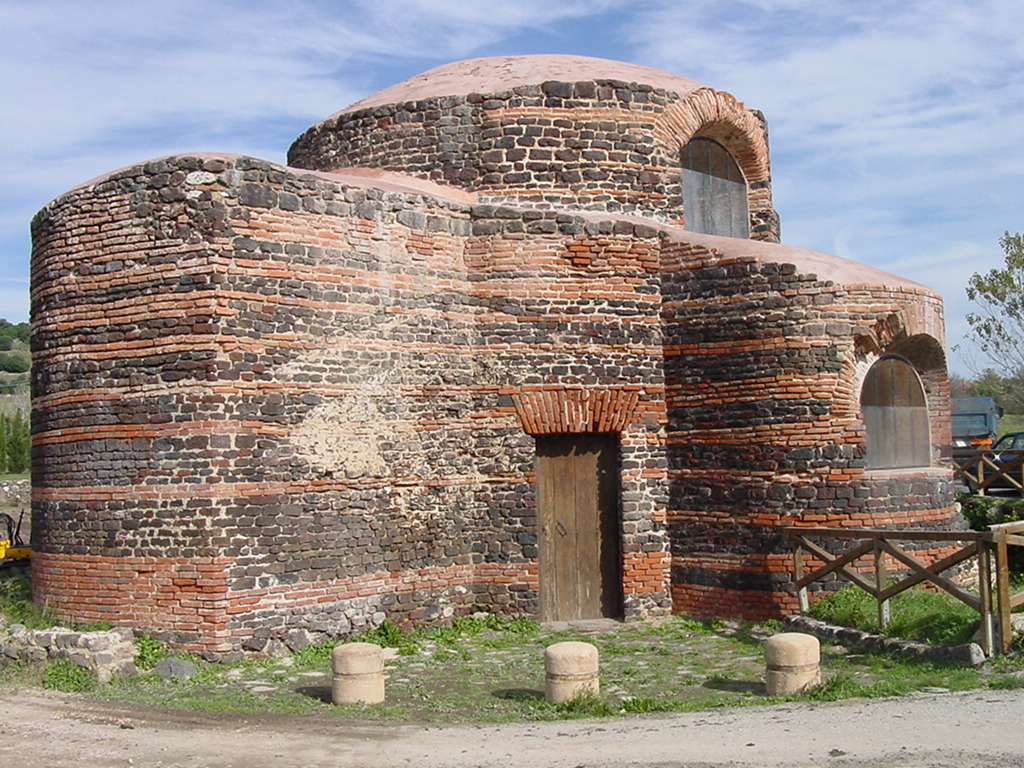
Nostra Segnora de Mesumundu

Nostra Segnora de Mesumundu ("Our Lady of Mesumundu") is a religious building in the territory of Siligo, Sardinia, Italy.

== History ==
Located in the archaeological complex with the same name, it was built in the 6th century, during the Byzantine domination of the island, over a pre-existing Roman structure (2nd century AD), which included a thermal plant. The Byzantines re-used part of the walls of the Roman building, as well as the aqueduct. The edifice could have been used as a baptistery. However, it is also possible that it was used for the purification of ill people through an immersion rite (in Greek language "αγίασμα" in English holy water).

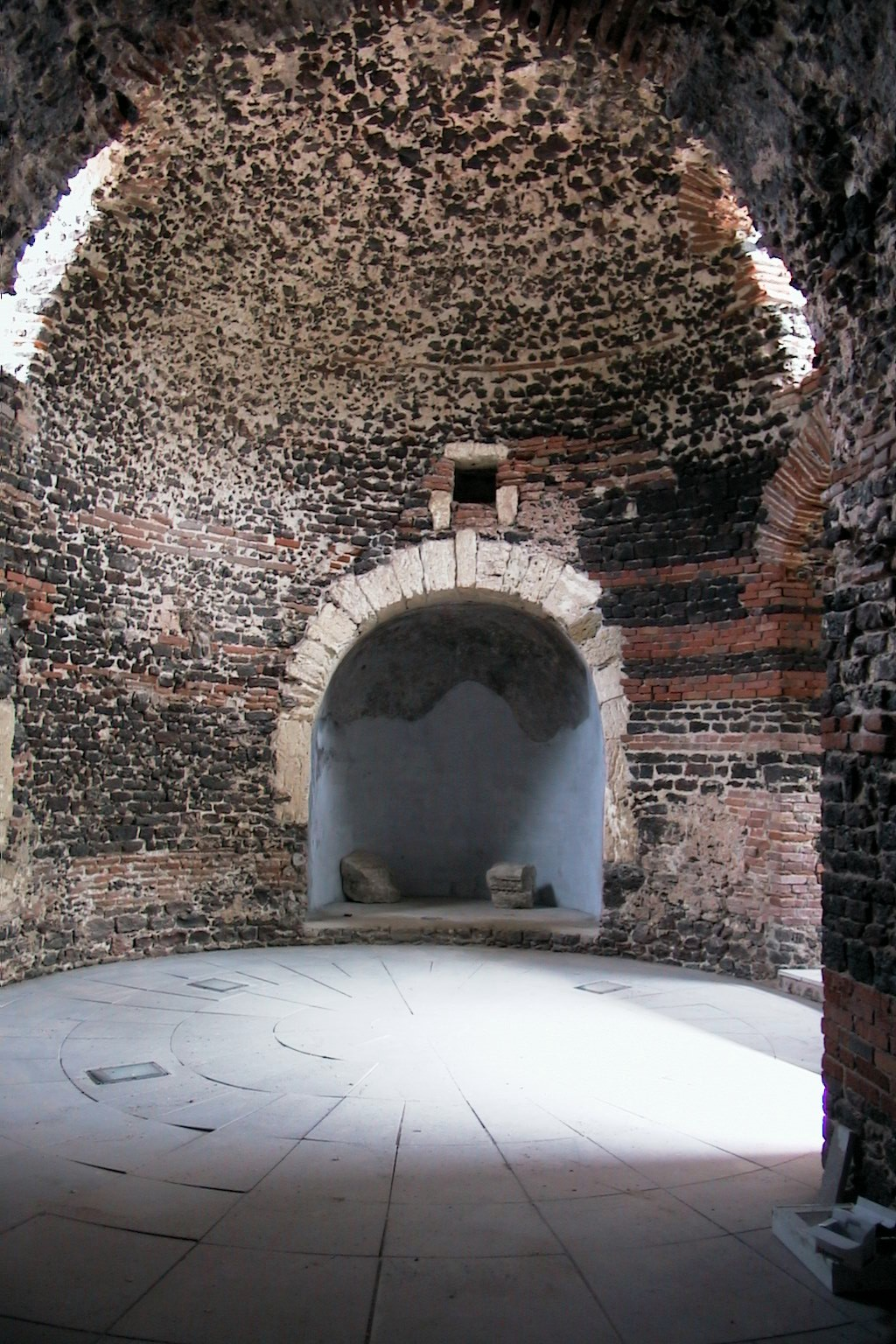
View of the interior

In 1063, the structure was donated by the Giudice (duke) Barisone I of Torres to the Abbey of Montecassino. When monks came from the Italian religious community they took possession of lands and goods and founded a monastery. The monks, moreover, to adapt the sacred building to the liturgy imposed by the catholic church following the East–West Schism, they added an apse and created a new entrance. For the work, they used materials from the nearby Roman ruins and the nuraghe Culzu.

On 24 June 1147 Gonario II of Torres, while on his way to the Holy Land to visit the Holy Sepulcher, he passed to Montecassino: on that occasion he issued, in favor of abbot Rainaldo di Collemezzo, a document confirming all the donations and concessions made to the monastery in the documents of his predecessors.

Towards the end of the 19th century and early 20th century the church was the object of interest by the architectural historian Dionigi Scano, who also oversaw a restoration project that was never implemented. Between the late 1950s and early 1960s, following two excavation campaigns, the archaeologist Guglielmo Maetzke established the dating of the temple to the sixth century.

== Description ==
The temple, which is particularly simple in construction, can be compared to the cross-domed typology for the ichnografy. The central body remains of the original structure, a rotunda with a dome covering with two large windows with lowered arch open on the upper part, together with two unequal arms both apsed, oriented to the west and to the south. The first is covered with a barrel vault, the second has a large arched window covered with a half dome. In the construction of the building, parts of the walls of the pre-existing thermal environments were reused. Also in that construction phase, the old Roman aqueduct was also restored, of which a fragment remains outside to the south of the monument. Inside the building, there are a fragment of the Roman canalization and, at a higher level, the remains of the channels from the Byzantine era.

== See also ==
- Mesumundu Archaeological Park

== Bibliography ==
- Johnson Mark, Santa Maria di Mesumundu a Siligo e gli edifici rotondi nei cimiteri cristiani della tarda antichità: datazione e funzione, in Itinerando. Senza confini dalla preistoria ad oggi, Volume 1.2, Morlacchi Editore, Perugia, 2015 pp. 425–441 ISBN 978-88-6074-722-8
- Frank Pittui, Il tempietto di Nostra Segnora de Mesumundu: Interpretazioni e restauri in Sacer n.13, 2006.
- F. A. Pittui, Il tempio dell'aghiasma (Note sul tempietto bizantino di Santa Maria di Bubalis detta Nostra Segnora de Mesumundu, Siligo (SS) in L'almanacco Gallurese 2002–2003.
- Pier Giorgio Spanu, La Sardegna Bizantina tra VI e VII secolo, Mediterraneo tardoantico e medievale, Scavi e ricerche, 12, Oristano, 1998.
- A. Teatini, "Alcune osservazioni sulla primitiva forma architettonica della chiesa di Nostra Signora di Mesumundu a Siligo (Sassari)", in Sacer, III, 1996, pp. 119–149.
- G. Paulis, Grecità e romanità nella Sardegna bizantina e alto-giudicale, Cagliari, 1980.
- G. Maetzke, Siligo (Sassari). Resti di edificio romano e tombe di epoca tardo imperiale intorno a S. Maria di Mesomundu, Notizie degli Scavi di Antichità, 1965.
