= Giovanni Colonna (archaeologist) =

- Born: 4 September 1934 (age 92); Rome, Italy

Academic background
- Education: Sapienza University of Rome

Academic work
- Discipline: Archeology
- Sub-discipline: Etruscan studies
- Institutions: Sapienza University of Rome

Giovanni Colonna (born September 4, 1934) is a contemporary Italian scholar of ancient Italy and, in particular, the Etruscan civilization.

== Biography ==
Colonna is an emeritus professor at the Sapienza University of Rome, where he has taught since 1980. He took his first degree at Rome in 1957, studying under Massimo Pallottino. He studied further at Rome and Athens and was then archaeological superintendent of south Etruria from 1964 until 1972. He has carried out numerous fieldwork campaigns in Etruria (Blera, Bisenzio, Bolsena, Montefiascone, Tuscania, Cerveteri, Ladispoli, Veii) and in other locations (Arcinazzo Romano, Saepinum, Valle del Sinello, Festòs). With his wife, Elena Di Paolo, he excavated the necropolis at Viterbo and published two volumes: Castel d’Asso (1970) and Norchia I (1978).

He is well known for his work on the Etruscan site of Veii and the temple of Apollo at that site. He has also carried out extensive work at Pyrgi and is the author of numerous articles and books, now numbering more than 300. Colonna is a member of the Accademia dei Lincei in Rome. In 2005, he was honored with a massive, 4-volume, 2,695-page collection of his work and writing entitled Italia ante Romanum imperium: scritti di antichità etrusche, italiche e romane (1958-1998).

== Publications ==
=== Books ===
- G. Colonna and L. Ambrosini. 2002-2009. Il santuario di Portonaccio a Veio. Rome: G. Bretschneider.
- G. Colonna et al. 2011. Corollari : scritti di antichità etrusche e italiche in omaggio all'opera di Giovanni Colonna. Pisa: F. Serra.
