= Jacopo Soldani =

Italian poet and statesman

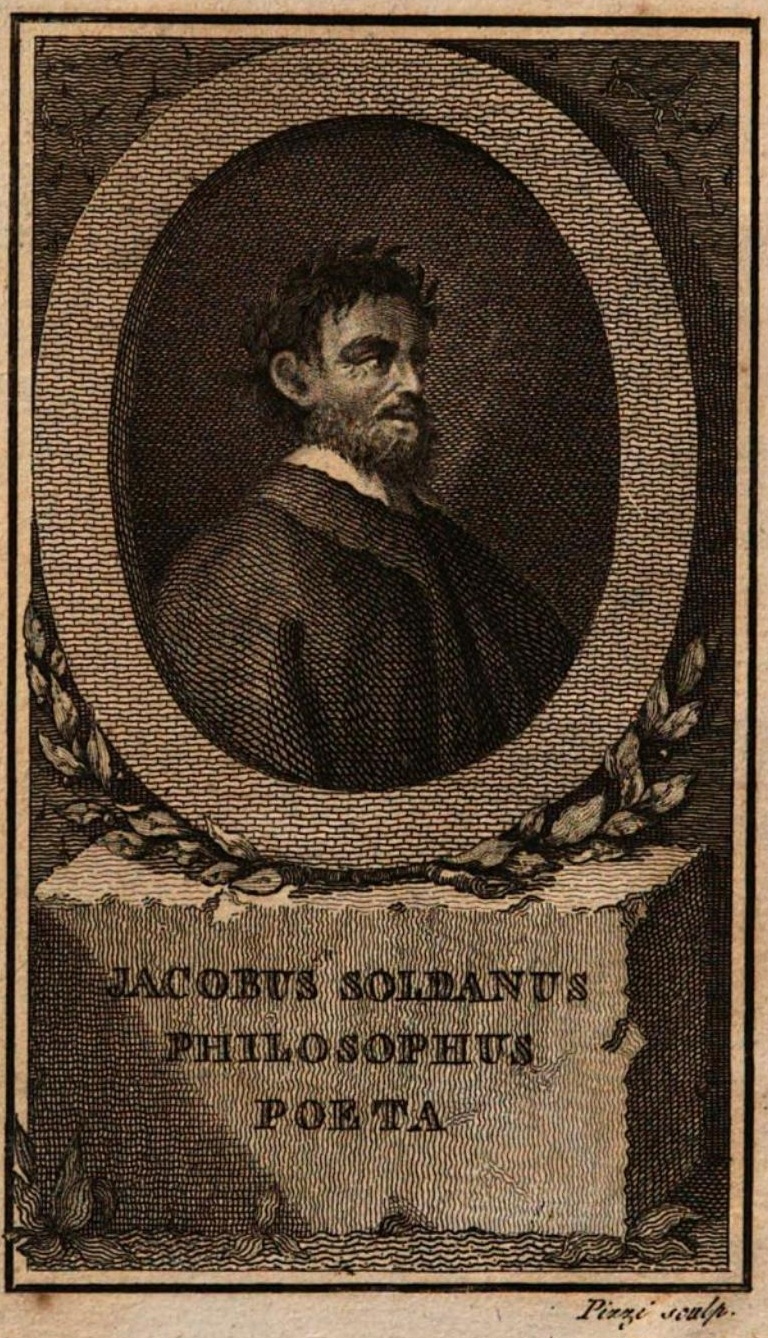
- Born: 1 October 1579; Florence, Grand Duchy of Tuscany
- Died: 11 April 1641 (aged 61); Florence, Grand Duchy of Tuscany
- Resting place: Santa Croce, Florence
- Education: University of Pisa
- Occupations: Poet; Intellectual; Civil Servant
- Spouse: Clarice Aldobrandini (m. 1607)
- Children: 9
- Parent(s): Bernardo Soldani and Ginevra Soldani (née Aldobrandini)
- Writing career
- Language: Italian
- Notable work: Satire
- Literary movement: Baroque; Neoclassicism

Jacopo Soldani (1 October 1579 – April 11, 1641) was an Italian poet and statesman from Florence.

== Biography ==
He was born in Florence to Bernardo and Ginevra Aldobrandini. The support of his uncle Jacopo Aldobrandini, allowed him to graduate from the University of Pisa with utriusque juris, or a doctorate in both civil and church law. In 1607, he married Clarice Aldobrandini, and together had nine children. One daughter married the scholar Niccolò Panciatichi in 1631, and one son, Filippo, became bishop of Fiesole.

As a young man he was a pupil or follower of Galileo, and was active in the many local Florentine literary academies. He helped found in 1603 the Accademia Bucolica dei Pastori Antellesi. He was able to obtain appointments to the position of regent of the private Accademia degli Alterati in 1604 and consul of the Florentine Academy in 1606–1607. He served as an advisor to the future cardinal Leopoldo, brother of the Grand-Duke Ferdinand II Medici. Afterwards, he served as chamber master to Ferdinando, and in 1637, appointed senator. He served the duke in Pisa and Siena in various activities.

His most prominent writings were not published while he lived. He wrote a short treatise on moral virtues, heavily quoting the Aristotle's work, and dedicated to the Grand Duke (Central National Library. Florence). He is best known for his satires, composed in terza rima likely between 1612 and 1637, but published only posthumously, in 1751 through the editorial work of Anton Francesco Gori. The Satire often mock the rigidity and vain pomposity of courtly life. Soon after publication, the Accademia della Crusca listed the work as exemplary of Italian grammar and vocabulary.

His circle of friends included Galileo, Gabriello Chiabrera, Giambattista Strozzi, Giovanni Ciampoli, and Michelangelo Buonarroti the Younger.

== Works ==
- Anton Francesco Gori, ed. (1751). Satire del Senatore Jacopo Soldani Patrizio Fiorentino con Annotazioni. Florence: Stamperia de Gaetano Albizzini.
