= Antonio Francesco Gori =

Florentine antiquarian

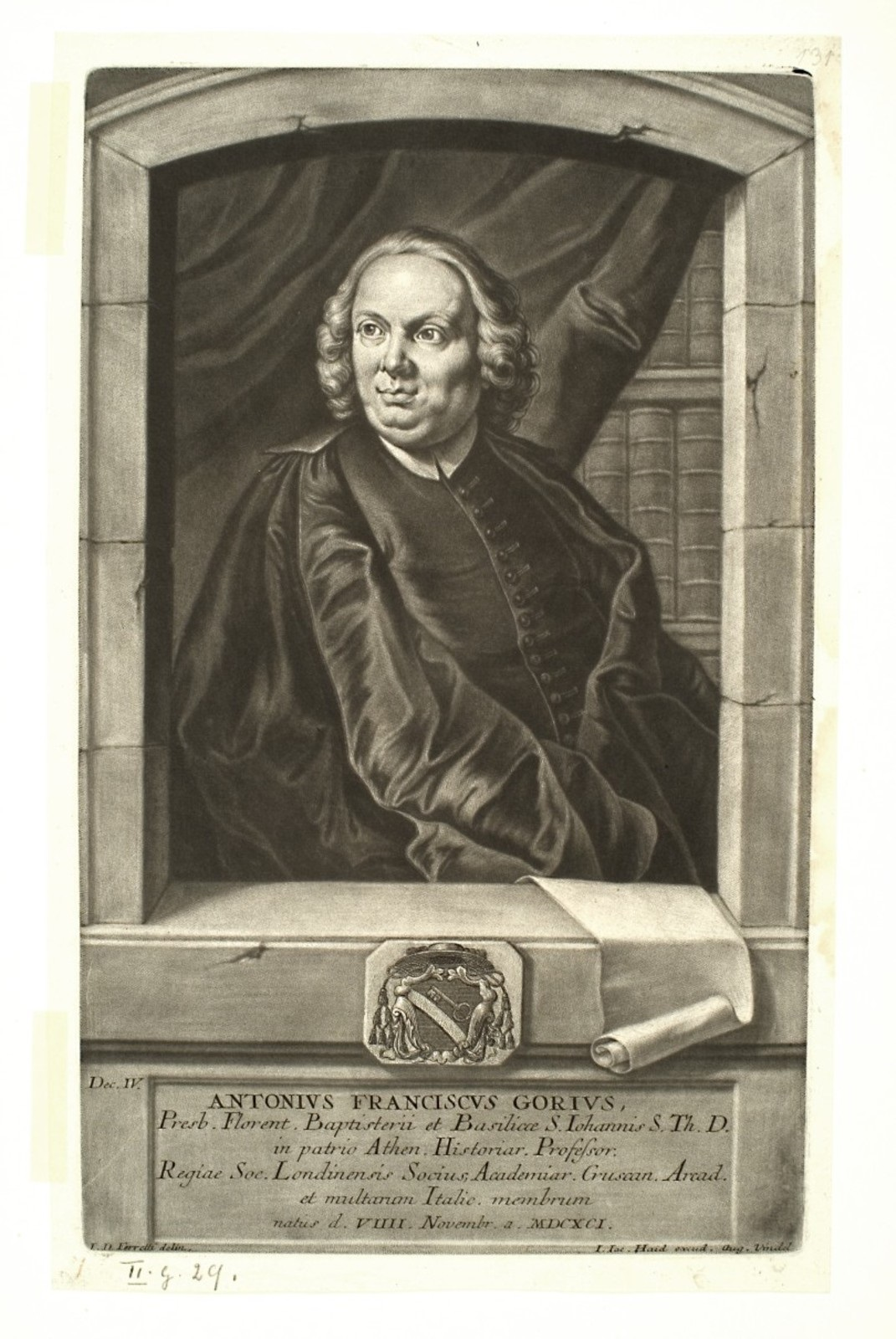
- Antonio Francesco Gori by Johann Jacob Haid
- Born: 9 November 1691; Florence, Grand Duchy of Tuscany
- Died: 20 January 1757; Florence, Grand Duchy of Tuscany
- Resting place: Basilica of St. Mark
- Occupations: Catholic priest, etruscologist, university teacher, archaeologist, historian, art historian
- Employer: University of Florence

Signature
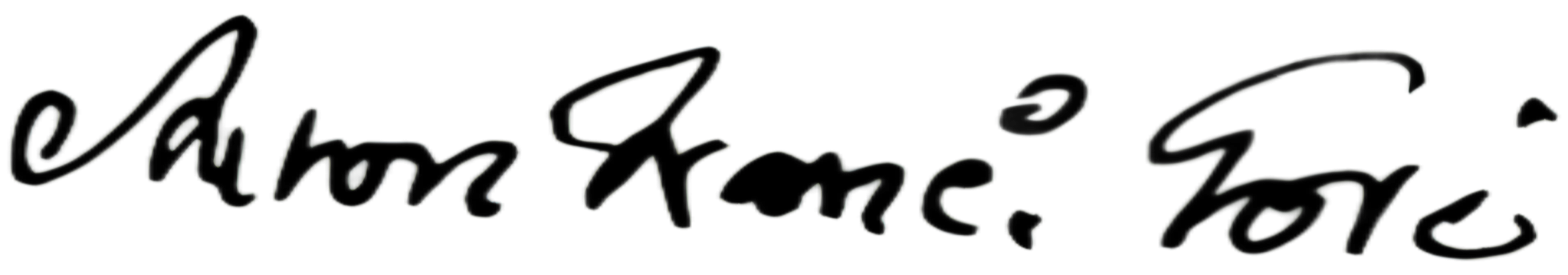

Antonio Francesco Gori, on his titlepages Franciscus Gorius (9 December 1691 – 20 January 1757), was an Italian antiquarian, a priest in minor orders, provost of the Baptistery of San Giovanni from 1746, and a professor at the Liceo, whose numerous publications of ancient Roman sculpture and antiquities formed part of the repertory on which 18th-century scholarship as well as the artistic movement of neoclassicism were based. In 1735 he was a founding member of a circle of antiquaries and connoisseurs in Florence called the Società Colombaria, the predecessor of the Accademia Toscana di Scienze e Lettere la Colombaria, to foster "not only Tuscan Poetry and Eloquence, or one faculty only; but almost all the most distinguished and useful parts of human knowledge: in a word, it is what the Greeks called Encyclopedia".

== Gori's early career ==
As a young man Gori studied with Anton Maria Salvini (1653–1729) and was inspired by the Etruscan studies of Filippo Buonarroti (1661–1733). He made a dramatic discovery in 1726 on the Via Appia near Rome. It was the columbarium of the household, both free and slaves, of Livia, the consort of Emperor Augustus. The following year he published it, with notes by Salvini, in a handsome folio with 21 engraved plates, under the title Monumentum sive columbarium libertorum et servorum Liviae Augustae et Caesarum, Romae detectum in Via Appia, anno MDCCXXVI (Florence, 1727). Each of the book's plates was dedicated to an influential patron of the arts or a well-known connoisseur of antiquities, among them the English merchant banker Joseph Smith of Venice, who, though not yet English consul, was already a promising collector and patron, and Sir Thomas Dereham (died 1738), an English bachelor who had been educated at the court of Cosimo III de' Medici and continued to reside in the city. Another publication of 1727 was Gori's repertory of classical inscriptions, Inscriptiones graecae et latinae.

No doubt on the strength of his publication the previous year, Gori was commissioned by the Salviati to produce descriptive text for a vanity publication that described the chapel of Saint Antonino, bishop of Florence, in the church of San Marco, a vehicle of Salviati patronage and of their public figura; the preface was signed by Alamanno Salviati.

== Museum Florentinum ==
The major undertaking that gave Gori a European reputation was under way from the early 1730s, when Gori started work on the Museum Florentinum, a comprehensive visual record of the Medici and other collections in Florence of antiquities of all kinds; the project eventually extended to twelve folio volumes, published 1731–1766. Gori employed artists like Giovanni Domenico Campiglia, Giovanni Domenico Ferretti and Alessandro Magnasco copies of famous works of which he oversaw the engraving and publication. The first volume, in two parts, Gemmae antiquae ex Thesauro Mediceo et privatorum dactyliothecis florentiae ... Imagines virorum illustrium et deorum. (1731–32) covered antique cameos and portraits, with 200 plates. The second volume, Statuae antiquae deorum et virorum illustrium (1734) was on Roman statues and monuments, with 100 plates; it was dedicated to Gian Gastone de' Medici, Grand Duke of Tuscany, last of the Medici Grand Dukes, whose collection dominated the publication. The third volume, in three parts, Antiqua numismata aurea et argentea praestantiora et aerea maximi moduli (1740 [I and II] and 1742 [III], with 121 plates. A fourth volume, Serie di ritratti degli eccellenti pittori simply consists of fifty portraits of well-known artists, architects, sculptors and engravers. The Museum Florentinum described for the first time many of the sculptures and antiquities in the Medici collections.

== Other publications ==
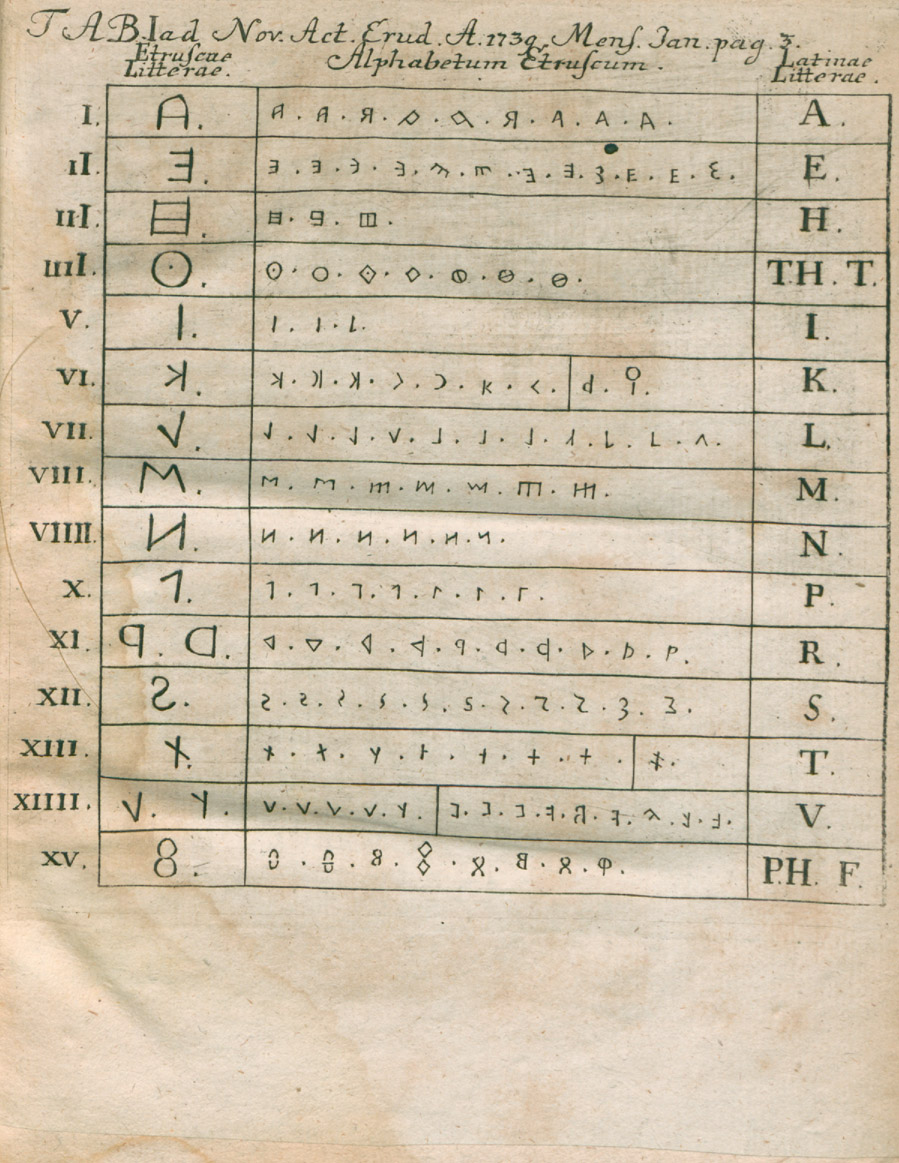
Illustration of Acta Eruditorum, 1739 with Etruscan alphabet and review of Museum Etruscum

Gori also published ancient inscriptions found in Etruria, in a series of volumes, his Museum Etruscum, in three volumes published between 1736 and 1743. These are among the incunabula of Etruscan studies, and incurred the jealous criticism of his rival in incipient Etruscology, Francesco Scipione Maffei (1675–1755); the two engaged in running skirmishes in print.

He edited Giovanni Battista Doni's collected transcriptions of ancient inscriptions (1731), and issued a publication on Late Antique and Byzantine ivory diptychs. His Museum cortonense (Rome 1750) in co-operation with Ridolfino Venuti of Cortona and Francesco Valesio of Rome, described antiquities in Cortona, both in the academy and in noblemen's collections.

Gori catalogued the collection of antique carved gems assembled by the Venetian art dealer and connoisseur Antonio Maria Zanetti (1698–1767), so it was natural at the end of his career that he compile the catalogue of the engraved and carved gem and cameo collection assembled by Consul Smith in Venice, not only carefully describing the gems, illustrated in 100 engraved plates, but also included a detailed history of gem engraving and a discussion of gem engravers, though he concentrated on the iconography of the subjects represented and did not attempt to ascribe the gems to a period. After purchase of many of the gems for George III, the work was sumptuously printed by J.B. Pasquali in Venice, as Dactyliotheca Smithiana., 1767.

Gori's other notable works include the earliest widely read published description of the first discoveries at Herculaneum, 1748. Symbolae litterariae (Florence and Rome, 1748–51).

Gori was also an authority on the Greek vases being found in such quantities in Etruria that they were considered to be Etruscan.

In 1751, Gori published the Satire or Satires by Jacopo Soldani.

Others remember Gori because of Galileo Galilei's finger, allegedly stolen by Gori from Galileo's tomb at Santa Croce, when Galileo's remains were transferred on 12 March 1737; the finger was kept in a bottle in the Bibliotheca Medicea at San Lorenzo, and shown to visitors.

Gori is buried in the church of San Marco, Florence.
