= Tarquitia gens =

Ancient Roman family

The gens Tarquitia was a patrician family at ancient Rome. Few members of this gens appear in history, of whom the most illustrious was Lucius Tarquitius Fiaccus, who was magister equitum in 458 BC. Other Tarquitii are mentioned toward the end of the Republic, but were probably plebeians, rather than descendants of the patrician Tarquitii.

== Origin ==
The nomen Tarquitius is thought to be another orthography of Tarquinius, the Latin form of the Etruscan gentilicium Tarchna. The Tarquitii would therefore be of Etruscan origin, perhaps from the city of Tarquinii.

== Branches and cognomina ==
The only cognomen associated with the Tarquitii of the Republic is Flaccus, a common surname originally describing someone flabby, or with floppy ears. The other Tarquitii of the Republic bore no surname, but a variety of cognomina are found in imperial times, including Priscus, old or elder, and Catulus, a whelp.

== Members ==
This list includes abbreviated praenomina. For an explanation of this practice, see filiation.

- Lucius Tarquitius L. f. Flaccus, magister equitum under the dictator Lucius Quinctius Cincinnatus in BC 458.
- Tarquitius, translated an Etruscan work on prodigies into Latin, under the title of Ostenturium Tuscum.
- Gaius Tarquitius L. f. Priscus, legate of Sertorius in Spain during the Sertorian War.
- Gaius Tarquitius P. f., quaestor in 81 BC, served under Gaius Annius Luscus in Spain during the war against Sertorius.
- Quintus Tarquitius, named on a coin commemorating the service of Gaius Annius Luscus in the Sertorian War, depicting Victoria driving a biga. From its resemblance to a coin of Lucius Fabius, one of Annius' quaestors, it was supposed that Quintus Tarquitius was another quaestor.
- Lucius Tarquitius, delivered a letter from Cicero to Atticus, concerning the impending Civil War between Caesar and Pompeius, in 50 BC.
- Marcus Tarquitius Priscus, a legate of Statilius Taurus in Africa, accused Taurus of extortion and sorcery. The Senate expelled him as an informer. Nero restored his rank and appointed him governor of Bithynia, but in AD 61 he was himself condemned for extortion.
- Tarquitius Crescens, a centurion serving under Lucius Caesennius Paetus in Armenia. He died in battle against the Parthians in AD 62.
- Quintus Tarquitius Catulus, governor of Germania Inferior sometime before AD 184.

== See also ==
- List of Roman gentes

== Bibliography ==
- Marcus Tullius Cicero, Epistulae ad Atticum.
- Gaius Plinius Secundus (Pliny the Elder), Historia Naturalis (Natural History).
- Sextus Julius Frontinus, Strategemata (Stratagems).
- Publius Cornelius Tacitus, Annales.
- Maurus Servius Honoratus (Servius), Ad Virgilii Aeneidem Commentarii (Commentary on Vergil's Aeneid).
- Ambrosius Theodosius Macrobius, Saturnalia.
- Dictionary of Greek and Roman Biography and Mythology, William Smith, ed., Little, Brown and Company, Boston (1849).
- Karl Otfried Müller, Die Etrusker, Albert Heitz, Stuttgart (1877).
- Edmund Groag, Arthur Stein, Leiva Petersen, and Klaus Wachtel, Prosopographia Imperii Romani (The Prosopography of the Roman Empire, Second Edition, abbreviated PIR^{2}), Berlin (1933–2015).
- T. Robert S. Broughton, The Magistrates of the Roman Republic, American Philological Association (1952–1986).
- Avner Rabban and Kenneth G. Holum, Caesarea Maritima: A Retrospective after Two Millennia, E. J. Brill (1996).
