= Banti's syndrome =

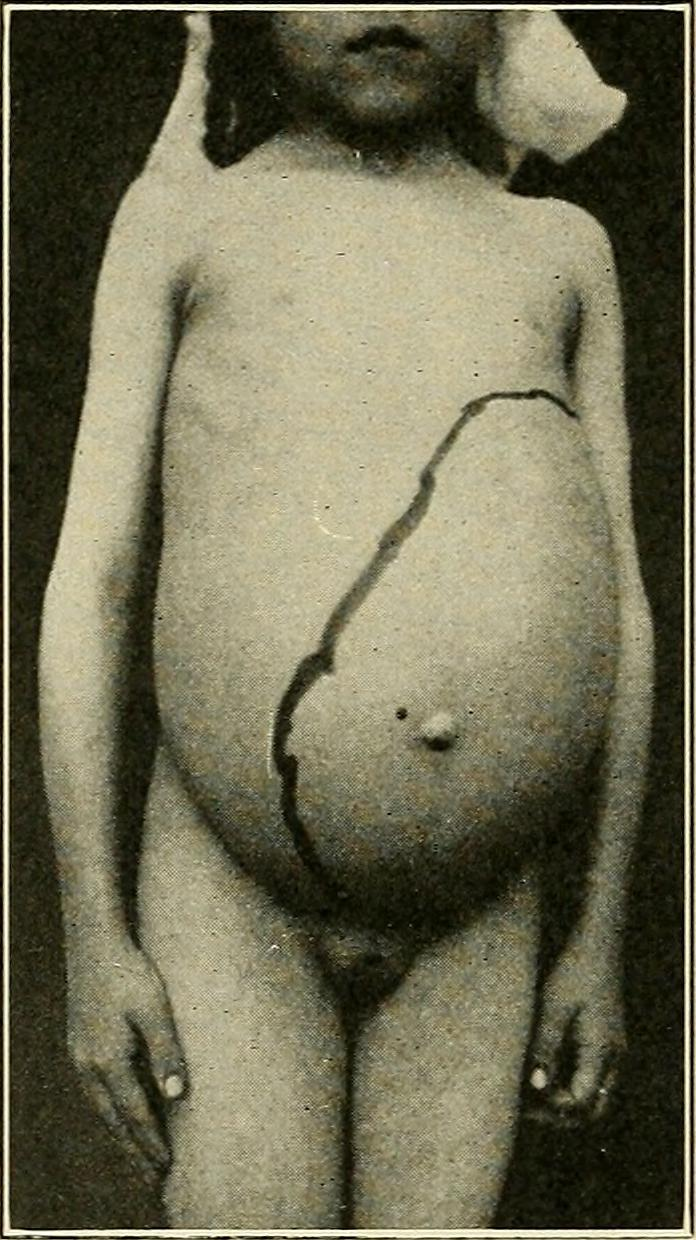
- Banti's disease in a child aged seven years
- Specialty: Hematology

Banti's syndrome (also known as Banti's disease), named for Guido Banti, is a chronic congestive enlargement of the spleen resulting in premature destruction of the red blood cells by the spleen.

== Presentation ==
Enlargement of spleen, ascites, jaundice, and the result of destruction of various blood cells by spleen – anemia, leukopenia, thrombocytopenia, gastrointestinal bleeding – may constitute the presenting symptoms.

== Pathogenesis ==
The basic pathology is some kind of obstructive pathology in the portal, hepatic or splenic vein that causes obstruction of venous blood flow from the spleen towards the heart. The cause of such obstruction may be abnormalities present at birth (congenital) of certain veins, blood clots, or various underlying disorders causing inflammation and obstruction of veins (vascular obstruction) of the liver.

== Diagnosis ==
Banti's syndrome can be diagnosed by clinical evaluation and specialized tests, particularly imaging techniques such as splenic venography and MRI.
