= Palazzo Liviano =

The Liviano Palace a.k.a. (Palazzo Liviano) is a building in Padua of the twentieth century, located in the capital of the old area of the city: it was built incorporating in its structure the remains of the Capitanio palace. Named in honor of the historian Livy, it now houses the School of Humanities, Social and Cultural Heritage and the Department of Cultural Heritage: Archeology, Art History, Film and Music of ' University of Padua and the Museum of Archaeological and Artistic Sciences. It is also connected with the Giants Room, an ancient frescoed structure that hosts concerts and conventions today.

It is currently in the western part of Piazza Capitaniato, an ancient courtyard of the Carrara Palace restored at the time of Venetian domination, when the seat of one of the two Venetian captains who ruled Padua was built.

== History ==
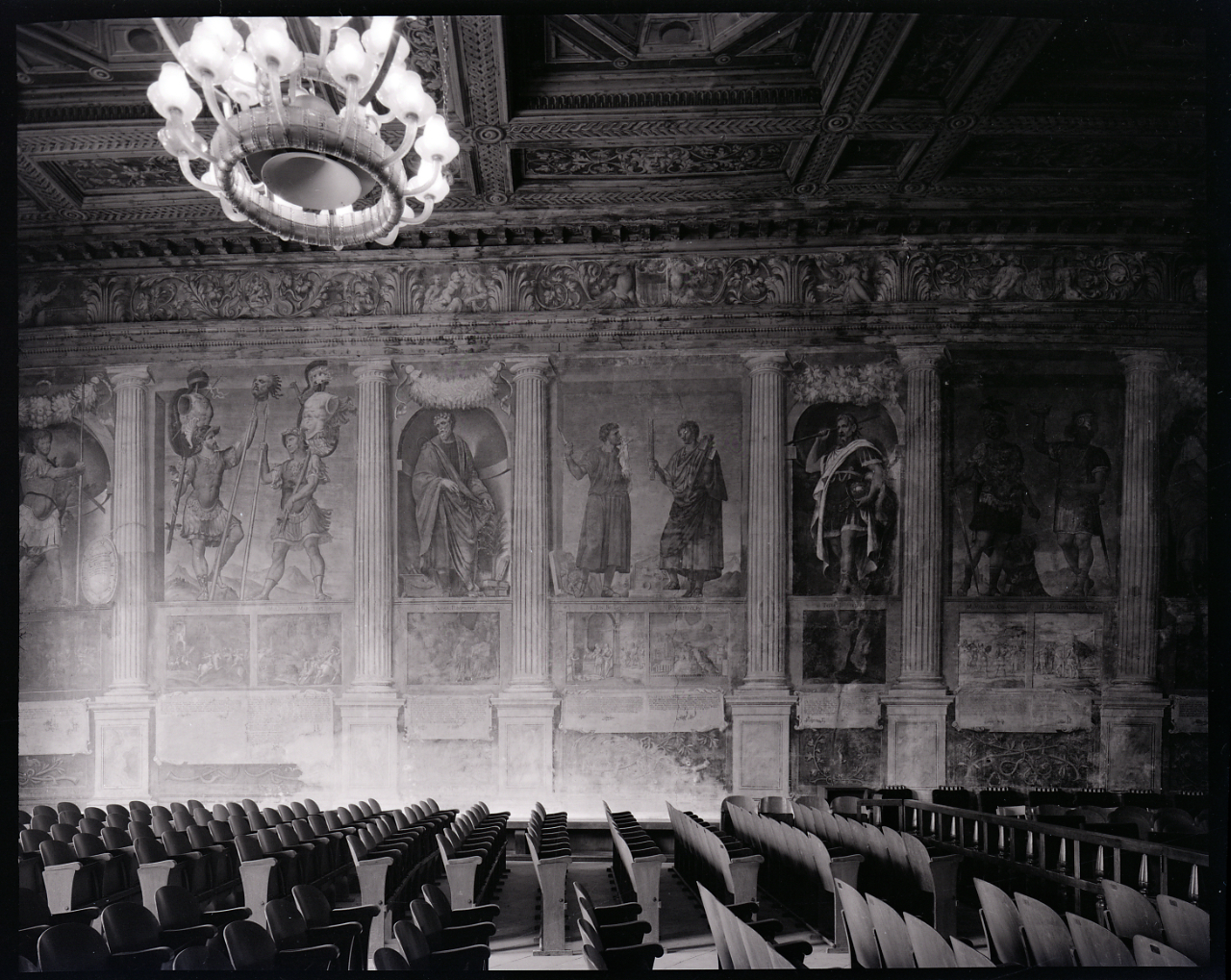
Giants Room. Photo by Paolo Monti, 1967

The palace was built on the initiative of Carlo Anti, rector of the University of Padua from 1932 to 1943, who in that period renovated many of the university buildings by inviting some of the major national artists to Padua. Structure of the metaphysical style, Liviano was built by the architect Gio Ponti in Milan, who also worked on various details of interior decoration. The fresco made in the atrium by Massimo Campigli between 1937 and 1940 depicts archeology, a heritage of Italian culture. In 2009 the frescoes of the palace had been restored. The sculpture of the atrium depicting Livy, chined and thoughtful, was made by Arturo Martini in 1942.

In 1937, the Museum of Archaeological and Artistic Sciences was built on the third floor of the palace, which still preserves important sculptural evidence of antiquity and Renaissance. The archaeological finds dating back to the Etruscans, the Greeks and the Romans are prominent. There are also anti-aircraft shelters in Liviano's underground, which have never been used.

The palace is directly linked to the famous Giant's Hall, where conventions and concerts are currently held. This salon, which is accessed via a staircase next to the current Liviano Palace, has its name for its frescoes that represent heroes and great characters of antiquity in size. The theme of the frescoes, which dates back to the early '500, resembles that of previous frescoes decorating a room now lost in the ancient Carrara Palace. The original frescoes were inspired by a work by Petrarch, then guest of the Padua lords.

== Related ==
- University of Padua
