= Guglielmo Maetzke =

Italian archaeologist

- Born: July 12, 1915; Florence, Tuscany, Italy
- Died: March 19, 2008 (aged 92); Florence, Tuscany, Italy
- Occupations: Archaeologist; etruscologist
- Organization: Etruscologist Massimo Pallottino

Guglielmo Maetzke (Florence, 12 July 1915 – 19 March 2008) was an Italian archaeologist and etruscologist. A pupil of the Etruscologist Massimo Pallottino, he directed important excavation campaigns in Tuscany, Lazio, Campania and Sardinia.

== Biography ==
In 1958 he founded the Soprintendenza archeologica per le province di Sassari e Nuoro (Archaeological Superintendence for the provinces of Sassari and Nuoro) in Sassari, of which he was the first director. From 1966 to 1980 he was director of the Soprintendenza alle antichità dell'Etruria (Superintendence of Antiquities of Etruria). He was also president of the Istituto Nazionale di Studi Etruschi ed Italici and president of the Accademia Etrusca of Cortona.

== Publications ==
- Patrizia Gastaldi, Guglielmo Maetzke, La Presenza etrusca nella Campania meridionale : atti delle giornate di studio, Salerno-Pontecagnano, 16–18 novembre 1990, Leo S. Olschki Editore, Firenze, 1994. ISBN 8822242610
- Guglielmo Maetzke, Istituto nazionale di studi etruschi ed italici, Luisa Tamagno Perna, La Coroplastica Templare Etrusca Fra Il IV E Il II Secolo A.C.: Atti Del XVI, Convegno Di Studi Etruschi e Italici, Orbetello, 25–29 April 1988, edition L.S. Olschki, 1992 ISBN 9788822239044
- Mario Moretti, Guglielmo Maetzke, The Art of the Etruscans, publication Harry N. Abrams, Inc, New York, 1970. ISBN 080140021X, 9780801400216

== Bibliography ==
- A. Minetti, G. Paolucci (a cura di), Grandi archeologi del Novecento. Ricerche tra Preistoria e Medioevo nell'Agro Chiusino, Toscana Beni Culturali, n. 13, 2010, pp. 101–104.
- Dizionario biografico dei soprintendenti archeologi (1904–1974), Bologna, Bononia University Press, 2012.
