= Luigi Pernier =

Italian archaeologist and academic (1874–1937)

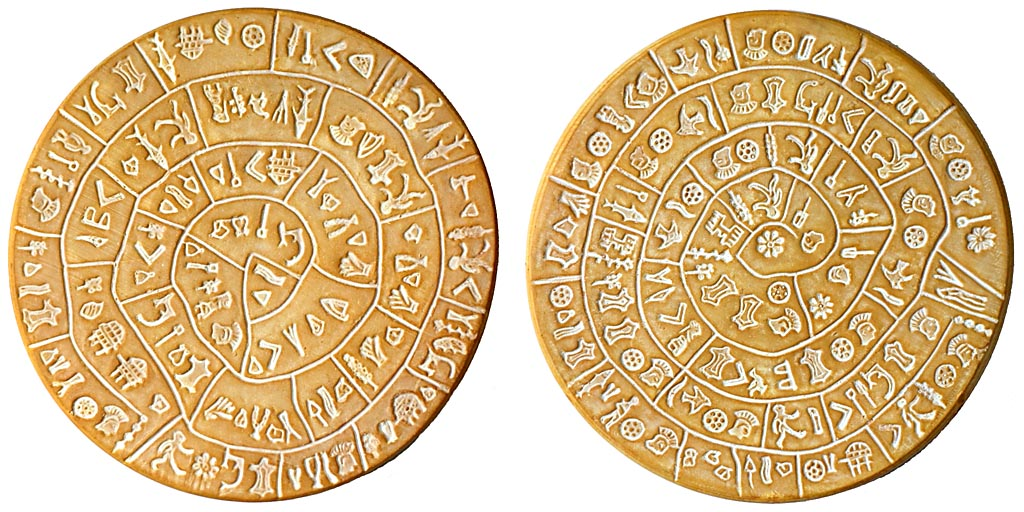
Disc of Phaistos: front/back

Luigi Pernier (23 November 1874 – 18 August 1937) was an Italian archaeologist and academic now best known for his discovery of the Disc of Phaistos.

== Career ==
Luigi Pernier hailed from a wealthy Roman family – his father, Giuseppe, was a French landowner, while his mother, Agnese Romanini, was a noblewoman. He attended the Ennio Quirino Visconti Liceo Ginnasio in Rome. In 1897, he graduated in Classics from the Sapienza University of Rome, under the supervision of Rodolfo Lanciani. He then pursued further specialisation at the School of Archaeology in Rome, obtaining his diploma in 1901 after completing training periods with the Italian Archaeological Mission in Crete, led by Federico Halbherr.

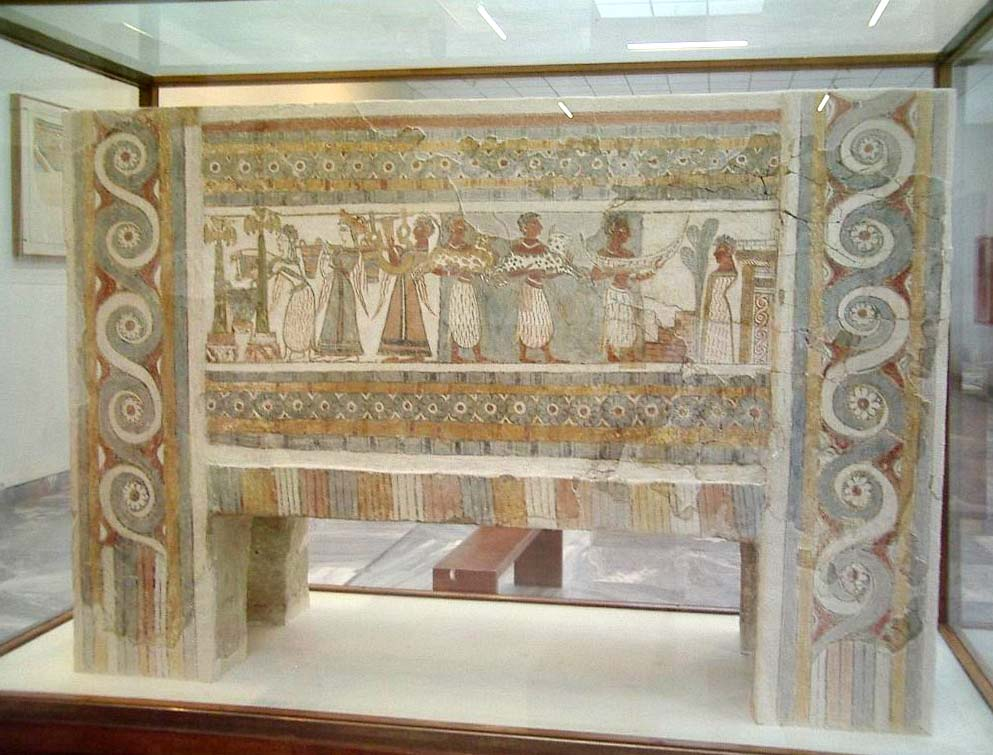
Sarcophagus of Hagia Triada

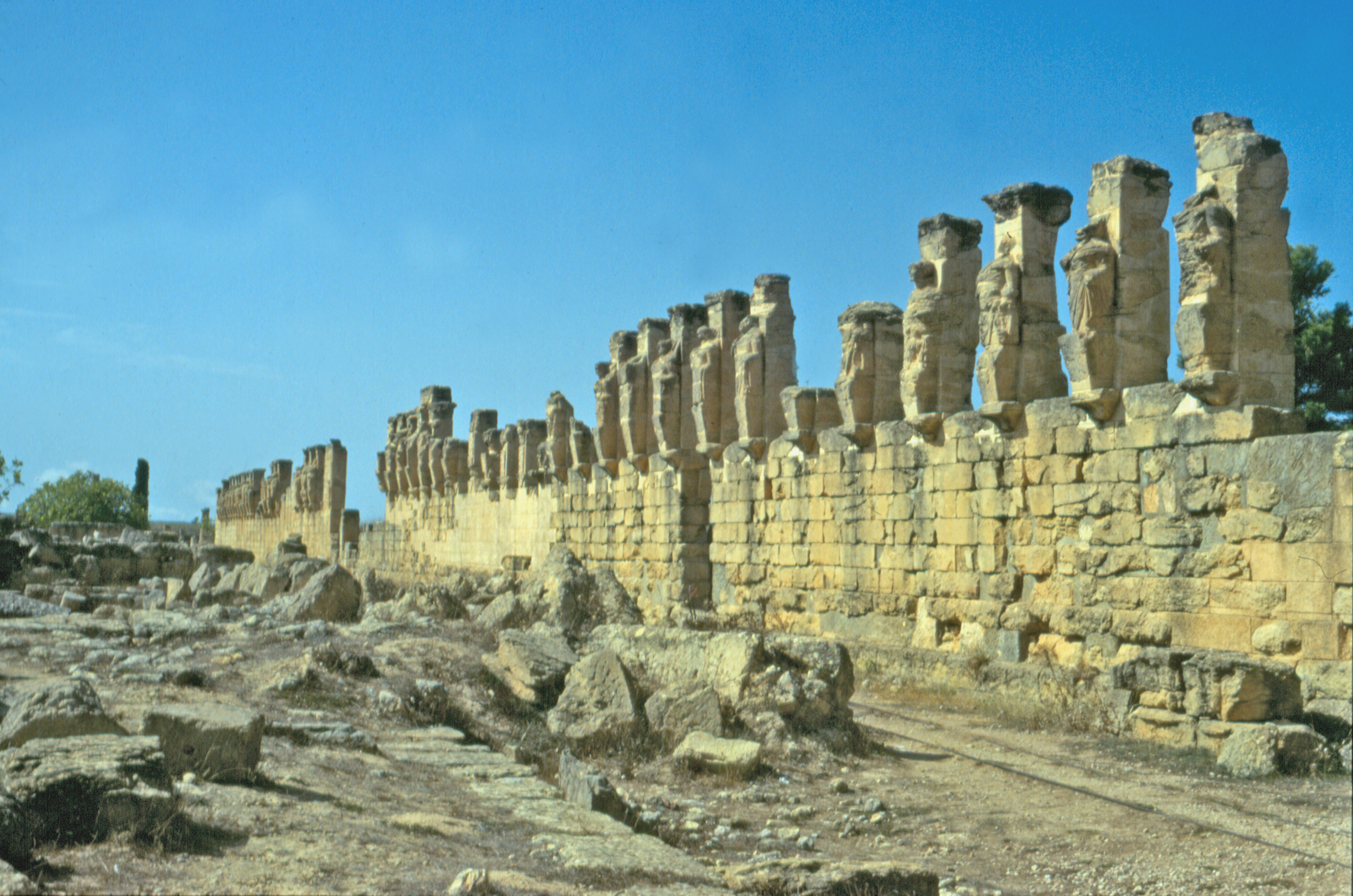
Cyrene

From 1902 to 1916 he was inspector of 'Museums, Galleries and Excavations of Antiquities' in Florence and carried out research at several central Italian sites; at the same time he joined the Italian Mission to Crete, directing its operations from 1906 to 1909 in place of Halbherr while the latter was detained in Italy. It was at this time that Pernier was involved in the discovery of the Phaistos Disc.

At Cyrene, from 1925 to 1936, Pernier carried out ten excavation campaigns as part of the Italian Archaeological Mission and (with Carlo Anti) led the excavations on the Sanctuary of Apollo. These duties kept him on the move so much that he died abroad, on Rhodes, where he was leading a course organised by the Società Dante Alighieri.

== Integrity ==
In summer 2008 Jerome Eisenberg, described by The Times as "a specialist in faked ancient art", accused Pernier of having forged his best known find, the Disc of Phaistos. A symposium was convoked to discuss the Disc in autumn 2008. Eisenberg argues that the disc can be dated by a thermoluminescence test, but in 2009 the Greek curators would not permit the disc to be examined. The authenticity of the Phaistos disc is supported by multiple discoveries made after the disc was excavated in 1908. A sealing found in 1955 shows the only known parallel to sign 21 (the “comb”) of the Phaistos disc. At the symposium, Eisenberg's hypothesis was therefore dismissed.

== Works ==
- A proposito di alcuni lavori eseguiti recentemente nell'interno del Teatro di Marcello. Roma : Tipografia della Reale Accademia dei Lincei, 1901
- Commemorazione del socio Federico Halbherr fatta dal corrispondente. Roma, Dott. Giovanni Bardi tipografo della Reale Accademia Nazionale dei Lincei, 1931
- Di una citta ellenica arcaica scoperta a Creta dalla Missione italiana. Roma : Calzone, 1909
- Heliogabalus : M. Aurelius Antoninus. Roma : L. Pasqualucci, 1911
- Il disco di Phaestos con caratteri pittografici. Roma : tip. dell'Unione editrice, 1909
- Il palazzo minoico di Festos : Scavi e studi della missione archeologica italiana a creta dal 1900 al 1934. Vol. I. Gli strati piu antichi e il primo palazzo. (r. Istituto d'archeologia e storia dell'arte). Roma : Ist. Poligr. Dello Stato, Libreria, 1935
- Il palazzo minoico di Festos : scavi e studi della Missione archeologica italiana a Creta dal 1900 al 1934. Roma : Libreria dello Stato
- Il tempio e l'altare di Apollo a Cirene : scavi e studi dal 1925 al 1934 : con 126 illustrazioni e dodici tavole fuori testo. Bergamo : Istituto italiano d'arti grafiche, 1935
- L'Odeum dell'Agorà di Gortina presso il Leteo. Bergamo : Istituto Italiano d'Arti Grafiche, 1927
- La raccolta archeologica Bargagli a Sarteano presso Chiusi. Siena : Stab. d'Arti grafiche S. Bernardino, 1920
- Lavori eseguiti a Festos dalla Missione Archeologica Italiana dal 15 febbraio al 28 giugno 1901 : relazione. Roma : [s.n.], 1901
- Lavori eseguiti dalla Missione Archeologica italiana nel palazzo di Phaestos dal 10 Febbraio al 28 maggio 1902 : relazione. Roma : Tipografia della Reale Accademia dei Lincei, 1903
- Lavori eseguiti dalla missione archeologica italiana in Creta dal 2 aprile al 12 settembre 1906 : relazione di Luigi Pernier al prof. Ettore De Ruggiero .... Roma : Tipografia della Reale Accademia dei Lincei, 1907
- Luigi Savignoni e la sua opera scientifica. Firenze : Stab. tip. E. Ariani, 1918
- Mura laterizie e terrecotte figurate di Arezzo antica. Roma : Tipografia della Reale Accademia naz. dei Lincei, 1920
- Nuove scoperte archeologiche a Tarquinii : (1904-1906). Roma : Tipografia della Reale Accademia dei Lincei, 1907
- Per lo studio del tempio etrusco. Roma : Nuova Antologia, 1927
- Recenti scoperte archeologiche degl'italiani a Creta. Roma : Nuova Antologia, 1927
- Ricognizioni archeologiche nelle sporadi. Roma : E. Calzone, 1914, Tip. Ed. Romana
- Ricordi di storia etrusca e di arte greca della città di Vetulonia. Roma : Tipografia della Reale Accademia dei Lincei, 1914
- Scavi della missione archeologica italiana in Creta nel 1907. Roma : Calzone, 1907
- Scavi della missione italiana a Phaestos, 1900-1901 : rapporto preliminare. Roma : Tipgrafia della Reale Accademia dei Lincei, 1902
- Studi sul teatro di Marcello. Roma : Tipografia Cuggiani, 1928
- Templi arcaici sulla Patela di Prinias : contributo allo studio dell'arte dedalica. Bergamo : Istituto Italiano d'Arti Grafiche, 1914
- Tombe eneolitiche del Viterbese (Roma). Parma : Stab. tipo-litografico L. Battei, 1905
- Tumulo con tomba monumentale al Sodo presso Cortona. Roma : Bardi, 1925
- Un singolare monumento della scrittura pittografica cretese. Roma : Tipografia della Reale Accademia dei Lincei, 1909
- Vestigia di una Citta ellenica arcaica in Creta. Milano : U. Hoepli, 1912
- "New Elements for the Study of the Archaic Temple of Prinias". American Journal of Archaeology. 38 (1): 171–177. 1934. doi:10.2307/498944.
