= Istituto Nazionale di Studi Etruschi ed Italici =

Italian cultural institution

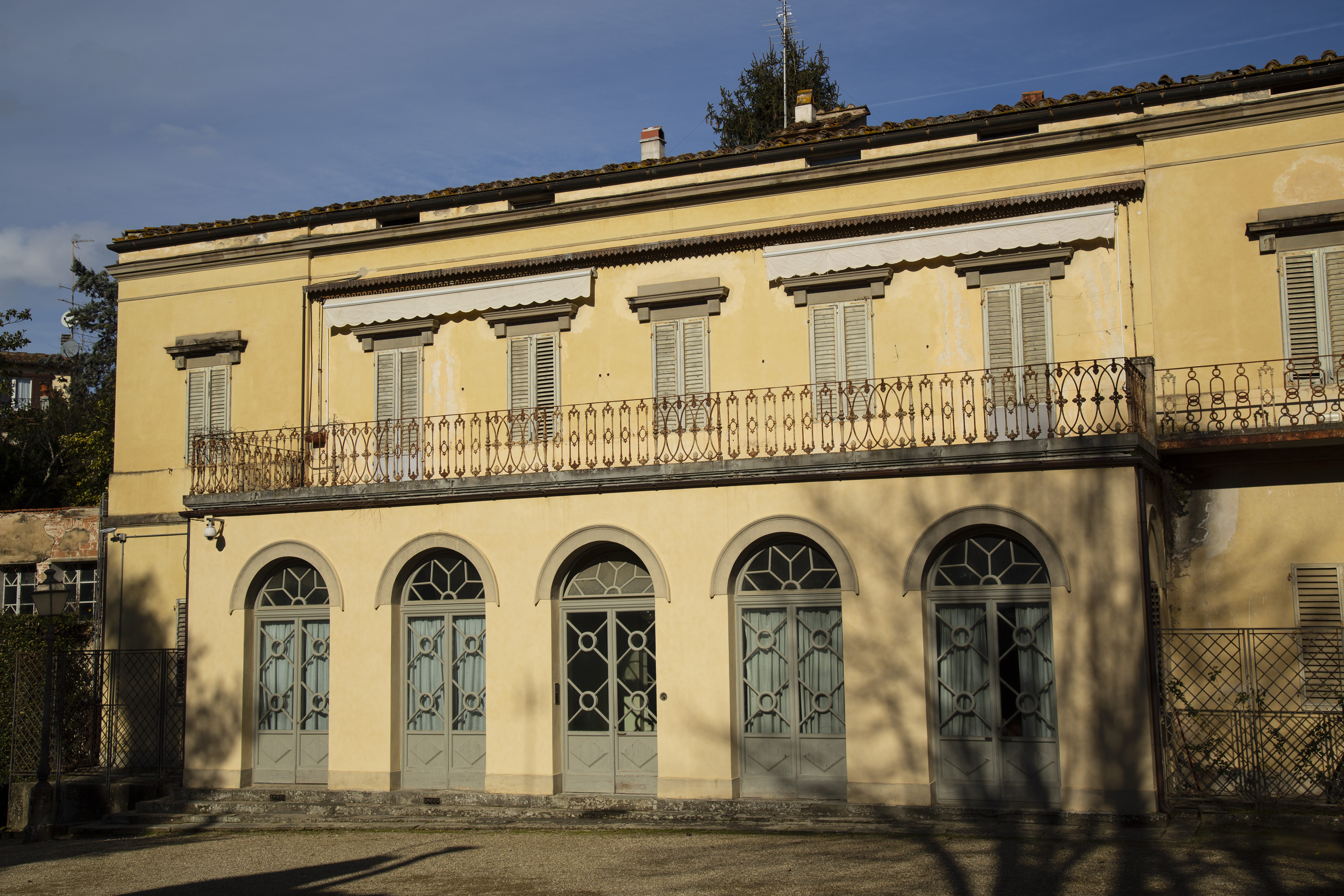
- Headquarters of Institute for Etruscan and Italic Studies (Istituto Nazionale di Studi Etruschi ed Italici), Florence, Tuscany, Italy
- Formation: 1925
- Type: non-profit research organization
- Headquarters: Florence, Tuscany, Italy
- Directors: Antonio Minto, Massimo Pallottino, Giuseppe Sassatelli
- Website: studietruschi.org

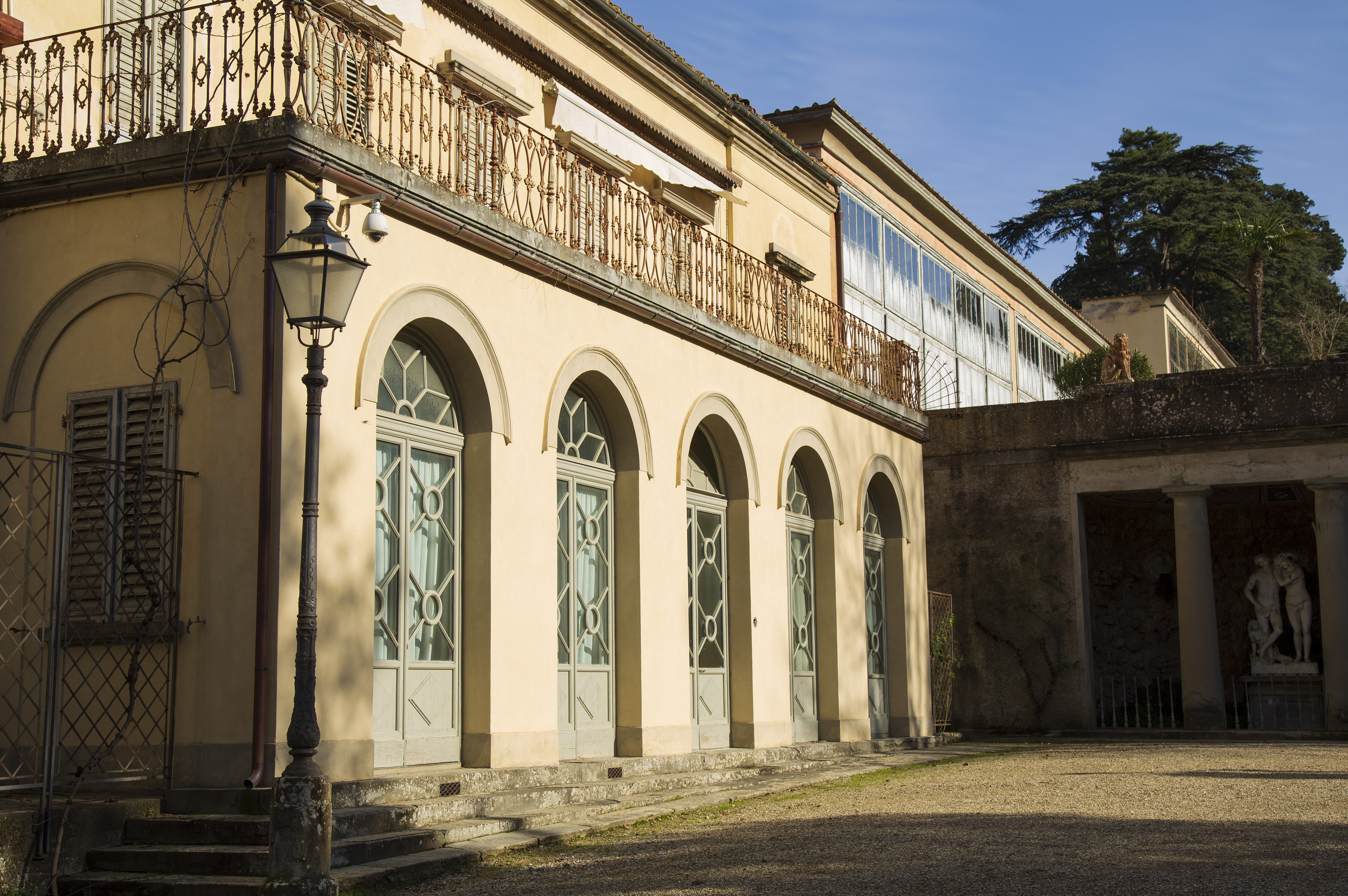
Headquarters of Institute for Etruscan and Italic Studies (Istituto Nazionale di Studi Etruschi ed Italici) inside the Boboli Gardens, Florence, Tuscany

Istituto Nazionale di Studi Etruschi ed Italici (English: Institute for Etruscan and Italic Studies) is a cultural institution based in Florence, Tuscany, Italy. It was founded in 1925 with the aim of promoting and enhancing in Italy and worldwide studies on the Etruscan civilization and other peoples of ancient Italy.

== History ==
Founded in 1925 with the name of "Comitato Permanente per l’Etruria" by the will of the Italian archaeologist Antonio Minto, renamed later as "Istituto Internazionale di Studi Etruschi" in 1932, "Istituto di Studi Etruschi ed Italici" in 1951, and finally in "Istituto Nazionale di Studi Etruschi ed Italici" in 1989. As stated in its 1989 statute, the Istituto Nazionale di Studi Etruschi ed Italici "aims to promote, intensify and coordinate research and studies on the civilization of the Etruscans and subordinately of other peoples of ancient Italy.

=== Publications ===
Since 1927, one of the Institute's tasks has been the publication of the annual journal "Studi Etruschi", published by the publisher Leo S. Olschki in Florence, and the publisher Giorgio Bretschneider in Rome. The Institute also produces the following series:

- Monumenti Etruschi. Volumi 1 – 13.
- Biblioteca di "Studi Etruchi". Volumi 1 – 59.
- Capua preromana. Volumi I – X.

=== Sections abroad ===
The institute also has 5 additional sections:

- Section "Etruria Padana and northern Italy", with headquarters in Bologna.
- Austrian section, established in Vienna.
- French Section.
- German section.
- Section USA based in New York.

=== Directors ===
- Antonio Minto (1927-1953)
- Giacomo Devoto (1954-1959)
- Giovanni Pugliese Carratelli (1964)
- Luisa Banti (1964-1971)
- Massimo Pallottino (1972 - 1995)
- Guglielmo Maetzke (1995-1996)
- Giovannangelo Camporeale (1997-2016)
- Giuseppe Sassatelli (2017-)
