= John F. Hall =

John Franklin Hall (April 14, 1951 - March 14, 2023) was a professor of Classics and Ancient History at Brigham Young University. He was a student of R. E. A. Palmer. Hall specialized in Rome during the reign of Augustus. He also made contributions in the subdiscipline of Etruscology. Hall is best known for his work on the Secular Games, which was published in the well-respected ANRW (Aufstieg und Niedergang der römischen Welt, or Rise and Fall of the Roman World). He has written on a variety of topics, a number of which focus on figures of Roman history with an Etruscan background. For example, he proposed that the Roman poet Virgil had Etruscan ancestry.

== Biography ==
Hall received his B.A. from Brigham Young University, his M.A. from Princeton University, and Ph.D. from the University of Pennsylvania.

Hall is a past president of the Classical Association of the Middle West and South, a professional organization for Classicists. He was instrumental in arranging, organizing, and hosting the inaugural exhibit of the Brigham Young University Museum of Art, The Etruscans, which featured artifacts from the Vatican's collection of Etruscan antiquities. Professor Nancy T. DeGrummond, the US's premier Etruscologist, also advised the exhibit. In connection with this exhibit, Hall edited the volume Etruscan Italy, which featured contributions from noted Roman historians, Etruscologists, and members of the BYU faculty.

Hall is the author of several important works on early Christianity, particularly in terms of providing insight into the LDS (Mormon) perspective. He has written Charting the New Testament, Masada and the World of the New Testament and parts of Apostles and Bishops in early Christianity, which is composed of lecture notes of his teacher Hugh Nibley which Hall pieced together, edited and footnoted for publication in a book format. His most informative work is New Testament Witnesses of Christ: Peter, John, James, and Paul, a discussion of the "pillars of early Christianity" both in a biographic fashion and also in respect to their doctrinal teachings about Christ. An editor of the forthcoming BYU New Testament Commentary, Hall is also author of several of its 15 volumes, including volume four about the Gospel of John.

== Bibliography ==
- "P. Vergilius Maro. Vates Etruscus," Vergilius 28 (1982), 44–50.
- "The Saeculum Novum of Augustus and its Etruscan Antecedents," ANRW II.16.3 (1986), 2564–2589.
- "Livia's Tanaquil and the Image of Assertive Etruscan Women in Latin Historical Literature of the Early Empire," AugAge 4 (1985), 31–38.
- "L. Marcius Philippus and the Rise of Octavian Caesar," AugAge 5 (1986), 37–43.
- "The Original Ending of the Aeneas Tale: Cato and the Historiographical Tradition of Aeneas," Syllecta Classica 3 (1992), 13–20.
- Etruscan Italy, Provo: The Brigham Young University Museum of Art, 1996.
