= Pericle Ducati =

Italian archaeologist and art historian (1880–1944)

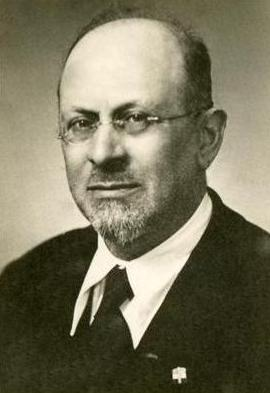
- Pericle Ducati
- Born: July 11, 1880; Bologna, Kingdom of Italy
- Died: 28 December 1944 (aged 64); Cortina d'Ampezzo, Italian Social Republic
- Occupations: Classical archaeologist and Etruscologist

Academic background
- Education: University of Bologna; Sapienza University of Rome

Academic work
- Discipline: Classical archaeology; Etruscology

Signature
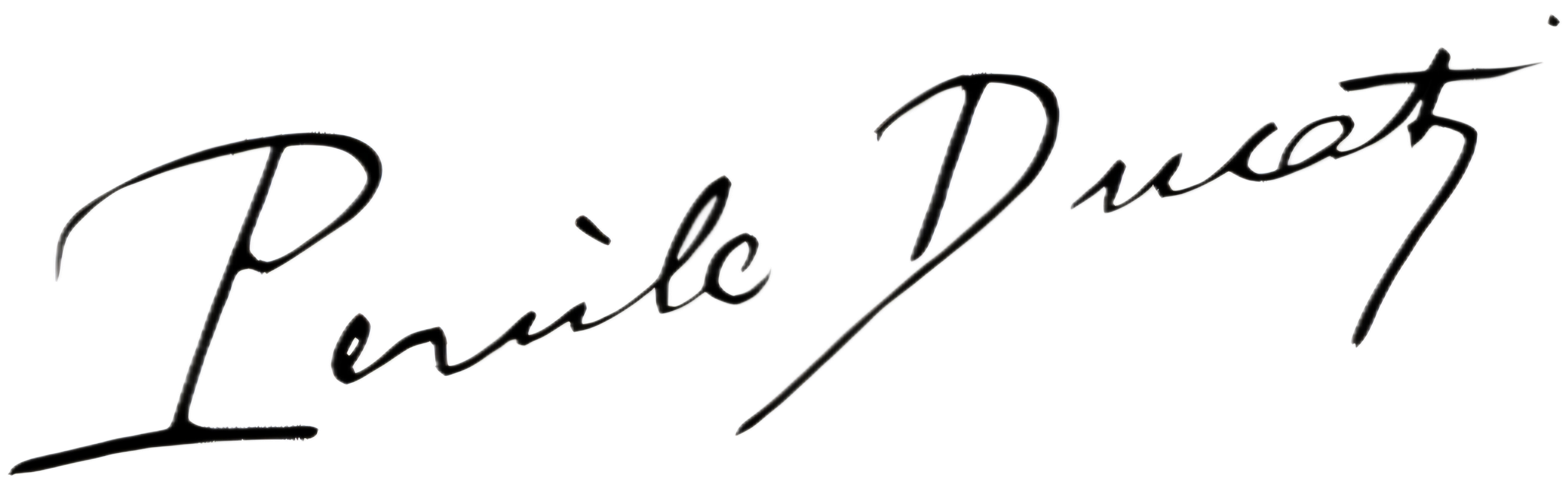

Pericle Ducati (11 July 1880 – 28 October 1944) was an Italian archaeologist and Etruscologist. He was a professor at the University of Bologna and the author of several studies on the Etruscan civilization.

== Biography ==
Pericle Ducati was born in Bologna into a family originally from Trentino. He studied Italian literature at the University of Bologna, where his professors included Giosuè Carducci and Edoardo Brizio. He later studied at the Sapienza University of Rome under Luigi Pigorini and Rodolfo Lanciani.

He then became a professor of classical archaeology at the universities of Catania (1912–1916), Turin (1916–1920) and Bologna (from 1920). From 1921, he directed the Archaeological Civic Museum of Bologna. From 1923 to 1924 and again from 1943 to 1944, he was dean of the Faculty of Letters and Philosophy at the University of Bologna.

Ducati was a member of the Superior Council of Antiquities and Fine Arts (Consiglio Superiore per le Antichità e le Belle Arti), as well as a member of numerous Italian and international learned societies, includin the Accademia dei Lincei, the Pontifical Academy of Archaeology, the German Archaeological Institute, and the Accademia di San Luca. A scholar of classical and Etruscan art, he wrote over 3,000 articles and monographs.

Following the Armistice of Cassibile in 1943, Ducati remained loyal to Fascism and joined the Italian Social Republic. This proved to be his downfall. On 24 February 1944, he was attacked on the doorstep of his home by members of the Gruppi di Azione Patriottica who shot him in the back, seriously wounding him. He survived the attack briefly and died of his injuries on 28 October of the same year in a hospital in Cortina d'Ampezzo.

== Works ==
- Brevi osservazioni sul ceramista attico Brigo, Bologna, Società cooperativa tip. Azzoguidi, 1904.
- I vasi dipinti nello stile del ceramista Midia. Contributo allo studio della ceramica attica. Roma: Accademia nazionale dei Lincei. 1909.
- Le pietre funerarie felsinee, Roma, Tipografia della R. Accademia dei Lincei, 1911.
- Contributo allo studio degli specchi etruschi figurati, [s.i.], [s.n.], 1912.
- Pitture funerarie degli etruschi, 1914.
- Sui riti funebri dei sepolcreti etruschi felsinei, Bologna, Stab. Poligrafico Emiliano, 1915.
- Osservazioni di demonologia etrusca, Roma, Tipografia della R. Accademia dei Lincei, 1916.
- Saggio di studio sulla ceramica attica figurata del sec. IV av. Cr., Roma, Tipografia della R. Accademia dei Lincei, 1916.
- L'arte classica, Torino, UTET, 1920.
- Storia della ceramica greca. Firenze: Fratelli Alinari. 1922.
- Contributo allo studio dell'arce etrusca di Marzabotto, Bologna, Stabilimenti Poligrafici Riuniti, 1923.
- Guida del Museo civico di Bologna (PDF). Bologna: Regia Tipografia Fratelli Merlani. 1923.
- I monumenti di Grecia e di Roma, Torino, 1924 (2ª ed. 1925).
- Etruria antica, Torino, Paravia, 1925 (2ª ed. 1927).
- Storia dell'arte etrusca, 2 voll., Firenze, Rinascimento del libro, 1927.
- Origine e attributi del Fascio Littorio, 1927
- Storia di Bologna. I tempi antichi, 1928
- Lisippo, Roma, 1930
- Gli scavi d'Italia, Firenze, 1931
- Pontische Vasen, Berlin, 1932
- Il santuario di Olimpia, Roma, 1932
- La scultura greca, Firenze, 1933–36
- La scultura etrusca, Firenze, 1934
- La scultura romana, Firenze, 1934
- Storia d'Italia. L'Italia antica dalle prime civiltà alla morte di Cesare, 1936
- L'arte in Roma dalle origini al secolo VIII, 1938
- Le problème étrusque, Paris, Librairie Ernest Leroux, 1938
- Come nacque Roma, Firenze, 1939
- Italia preromana e stirpe italica, 1940
- Preistoria e Protostoria dell'Emilia, 1942

== Bibliography ==
- Parise, Nicola (1992). "DUCATI, Pericle". Dizionario Biografico degli Italiani (in Italian). Vol. 41: Donaggio–Dugnani. Rome: Istituto dell'Enciclopedia Italiana. ISBN 978-88-12-00032-6.
- Ridgway, Serra (1996). "Ducati Pericle". In Nancy Thomson de Grummond (ed.). Encyclopedia of the History of Classical Archaeology. Vol. 1. Westport, CT: Greenwood Press. p. 375.
