= Giulio Giglioli =

Italian classical art historian (1886–1957)

Giulio Quirino Giglioli (25 March 1886 – 11 November 1957 in Rome, Italy) was an art historian of classical Roman and Etruscan art and was associated with Fascism in Italy.

Giglioli was a student of and assistant to both Emanuel Löwy and Rodolfo Lanciani. He fought in World War I, during which time he published the newly discovered statue of Apollo from Veii in 1916. In the post-war years, he held positions at the Università di Roma, beginning in 1923. There, he served as professor of ancient topography as well as classical art history. He became a member of the city council in 1935.

In the field, he excavated Etruscan sites and also worked on the Fascist projects in Rome, notably the excavations of the Forum of Augustus and the Mausoleum of Augustus. Since his work was carried out largely in the 1930s, he demonstrated the required allegiance to Fascism and to Benito Mussolini. Giglioli has been described as "the chief archaeologist of the regime, (who) used his research to argue that the national and historical aims of Fascism were part of a continuous trajectory of Roman history." After the fall of Il Duce in 1943, Giglioli returned to the university and would establish the journal Archeologia Classica in 1948. Among his students was Massimo Pallottino, who would pioneer Etruscan studies as an academic discipline.

== Bibliography ==
1. Corpus vasorum antiquorum. Italia. Museo nazionale di Villa Giulia in Roma. (1925ff)
2. L’arte etrusca (1935)
3. L'Arte greca 2 vols. (1955)
4. Corpus vasorum antiquorum. Italia. Musei capitolini di Roma. (1962)
