= Emanuel Löwy =

Austrian archaeologist (1857–1938)

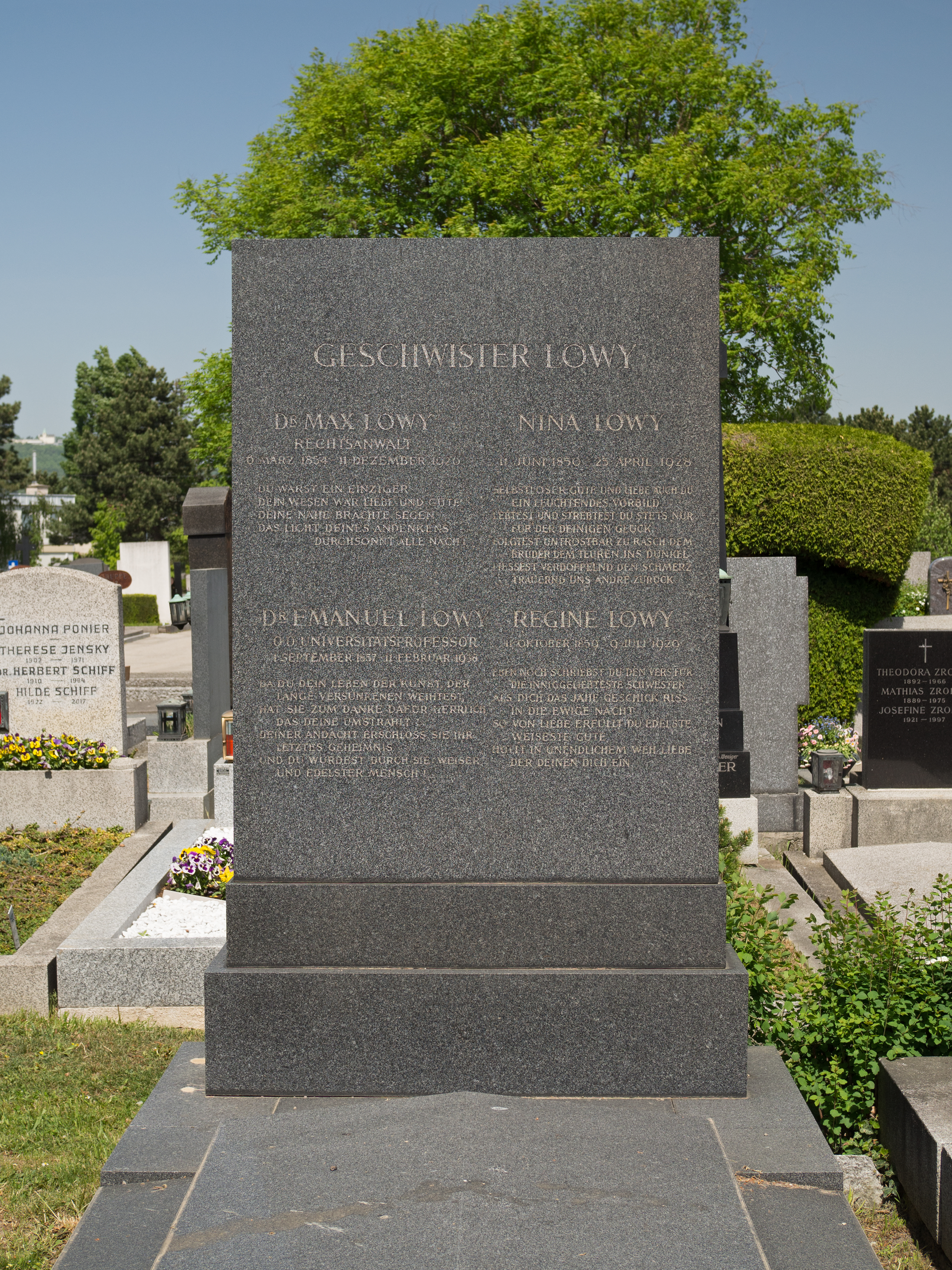
The tomb of Emanuel Löwy in Vienna

Emanuel Löwy (also Loewy; September 1, 1857, Vienna – February 11, 1938, Vienna) was an Austrian classical archaeologist and theorist who employed the methodology of universal psychological sources of form in his work.

Löwy was influenced by the concept of "das Gedächtnisbild" by Ernst Brücke. Löwy was also a friend of the famous psychoanalyst Sigmund Freud. Among his academic specialties was the art of ancient Greek vase painting.

Löwy served as a professor of archaeology at the University of Rome (1891–1915) where he taught, among others, Giulio Giglioli. Löwy was also professor of archaeology at the University of Vienna (1918–1938).

== Bibliography ==
- Untersuchungen zur griechischen Künstlergeschichte. Vienna: Gerold's [sic] Sohn, 1883.
- "Inschriften griechischer Bildhauer" (1885);
- Griechische Inschrifttexte Vienna: Tempsky: 1888.
- Lysipp und seine Stellung in der griechischen Plastik Hamburg: Sammlung gemeinverständlicher wissenschafter Vorträge, 1891.
- Die Naturwiedergabe in der älteren griechischen Kunst Rome: Loescher, 1900.
- Die griechische Plastik. 2 vols. Leipzig: Klinkhardt und Biermann, 1911.
- Stein und Erz in der statuarischen Kunst. Innsbruck: Wagner, 1915.
- Neuattische Kunst. Leipzig: Seeman, 1922.
- Die Anfänge des Triumphbogens Vienna: Anton Schroll, 1928.
- Polygnot: Ein Buch von griechischer Malerei. 2 vols. Vienna: Anton Schroll, 1929.
- Ursprünge der bildenden Kunst. Vienna: Holder-Pilchler-Tempsky, 1930.
- Zur Chronologie der frühgriechischen Kunst: Die Artemistempel von Ephesos. Vienna: Holder-Pichler-Tempsky, 1932.
- "Der Beginn der rotfigurigen Vasenmalerei" (1938)
