= Guido Banti =

Italian physician and pathologist

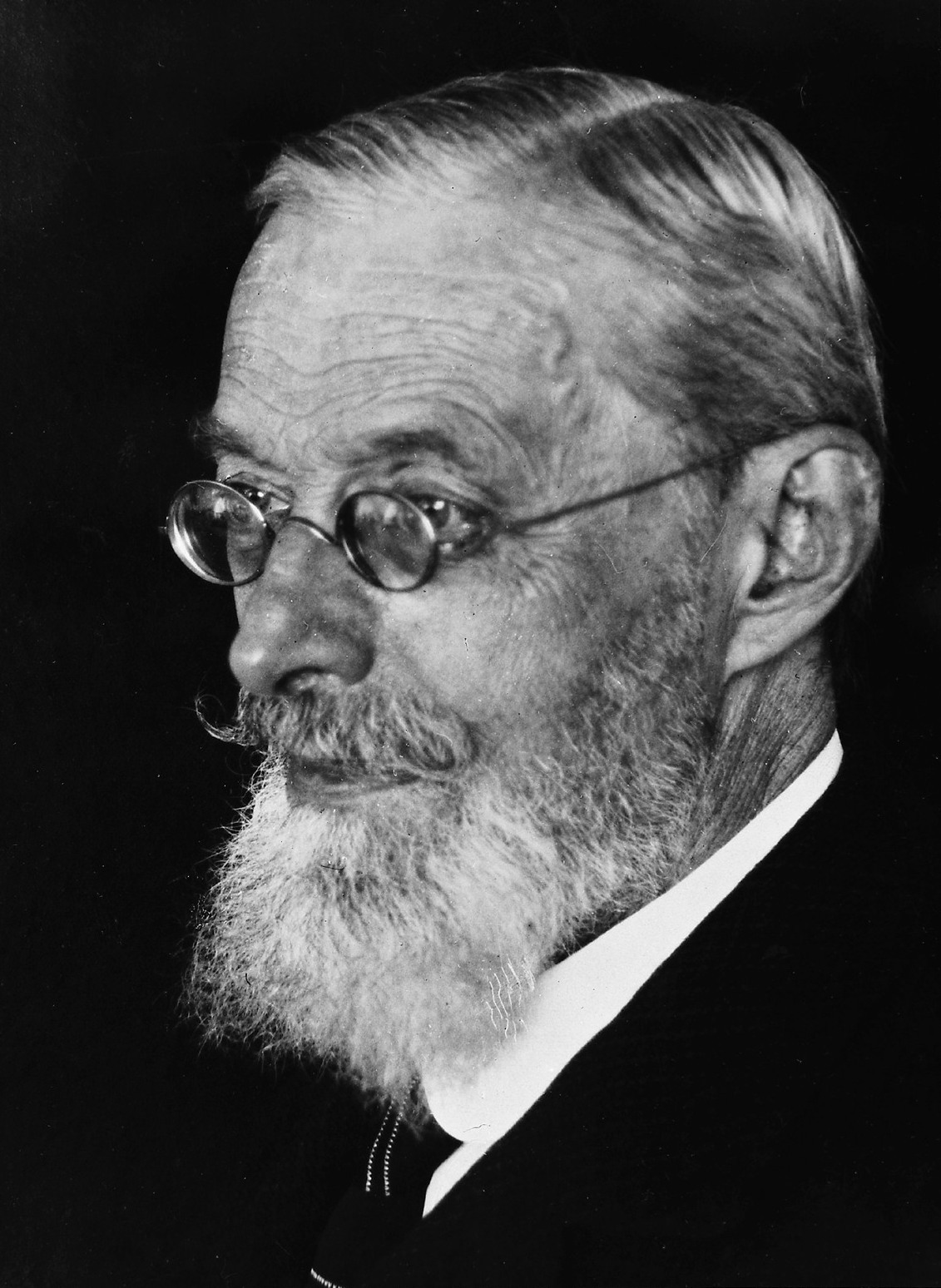
Guido Banti

Guido Banti (8 June 1852 – 8 January 1925) was an Italian physician and pathologist. He also performed innovative studies on the heart, infectious diseases and bacteriology, splenomegaly, nephrology, lung disease, leukaemia and motor aphasia. He gave his name to Banti’s disease.

== Biography ==
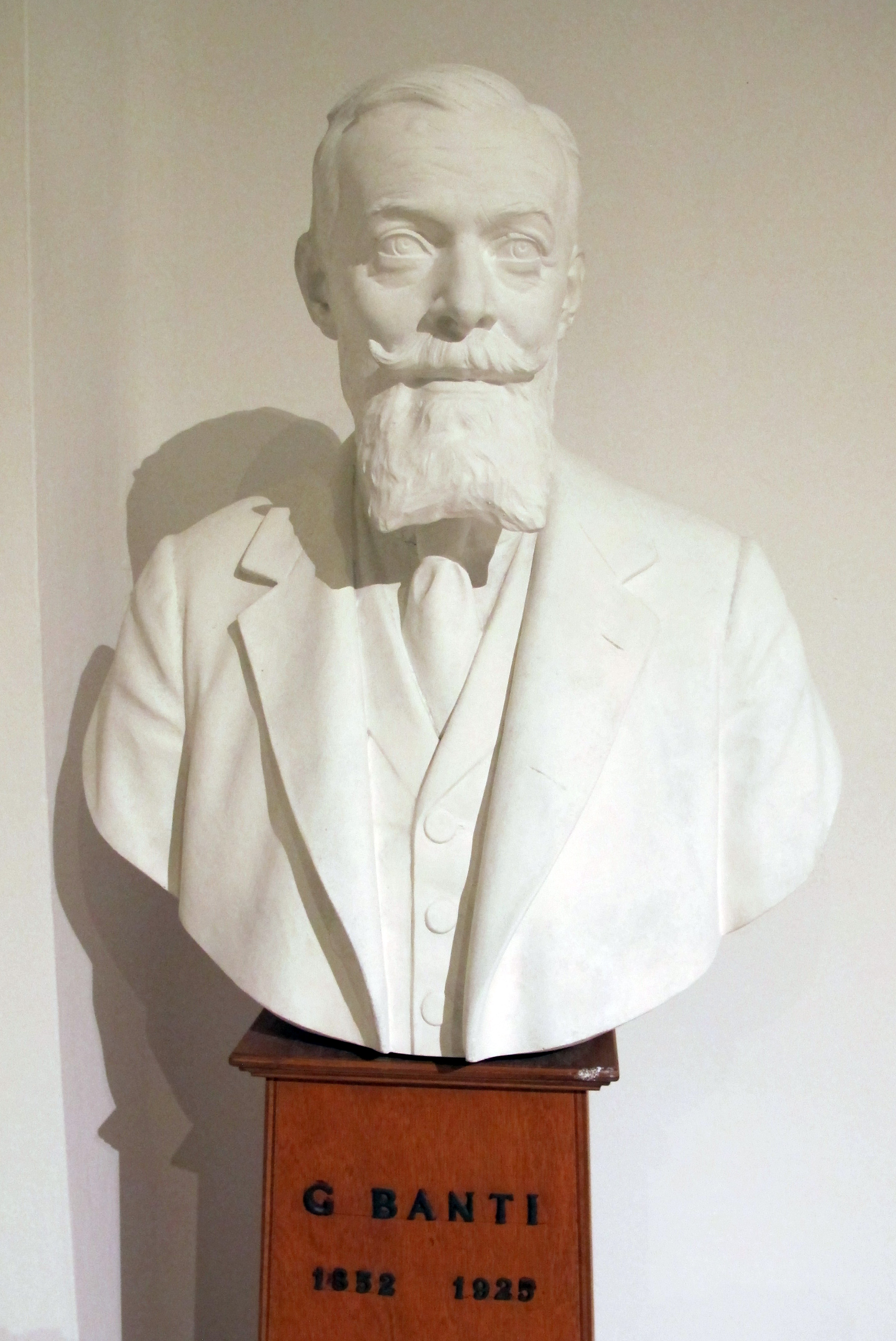
Bust of Banti at the museum of the Institute of Anatomy and Pathology in Padua

Banti was born in Montebichieri in Tuscany. His father was a physician. He studied medicine at the University of Pisa and later the Medical School in Florence where he graduated in 1877. He was appointed to an assistant’s position at the local Hospital of Santa Maria Nuova and concurrently, as an assistant at the Laboratory of Pathological Anatomy. The ability to observe patients in bed and then carry out post mortem examination was to prove fundamental in parts of his work.

Working under the guidance of Celso Pellizzari by 1882 he was chief of medical services. In 1895, after a 5-year spell in a temporary post, he was appointed Ordinary Professor of Pathological Anatomy in the medical school in Florence. He remained in this post for 29 years until his retirement and death a year later in 1925.

== Work ==
Banti’s lifetime’s work ranged across several specialties. He published the first textbook in Italy on the techniques of bacteriology; Manuale di Tecnica Batteriologica, (Florence, 1885).

In 1886, he undertook a study of heart enlargement, and at the same time as an anatomist he studied the causes of aphasia, confuting the contemporary theory of Pierre Marie with a publication A proposito de recenti sulle afasie (Florence, 1907), followed in 1898 by a study of hyperplastic gastritis. He spent time studying cancer cells in 1890–93. 1894 he published a study of typhoid fever, Le setticemie tifiche (Florence). In 1895 he wrote about endocarditis and nephritis, Endocarditis e nefriti. (Florence) describing various forms of endocarditis and atherosclerosis of the kidney.

From 1882 to 1914 he studied various forms of splenomegaly, enlargement of the spleen, with neither infection nor degeneration. He described one form that was characterized by progressive anaemia in adults, and from his earliest studies he described a new form of enlarged spleen which led to cirrhosis of the liver with ascites and eventual death. This work resulted in two papers, Dell’anemia splenica and Archivo di anatomica patologica (1882) describing the condition that would be known as Banti’s disease. Banti proposed that the enlarged spleen was the cause of red cell destruction which led to anemia and that only removal of the spleen could stop this process. On his advice the first splenectomy for haemolytic jaundice was carried out in Florence in 1903.

Banti’s name is associated closely with leukaemia. He asserted in 1903 that “All leukaemias belong to the sarcomatoses”, this was contrary to the existing opinions of Artur Pappenheim and Carl von Sternberg. Banti continued with further observations and in 1913 decided that the leukaemias are systematic diseases arising from the haemopoietic structures, bone marrow and lymph glands, and that they are the result of the uncontrolled proliferation of staminal blood cells. This definition accords closely with the modern definition.

Banti was a municipal advisor and consultant to the sanitary services in Florence from 1907 to 1909.
