= Massimo Pallottino =

Italian archaeologist

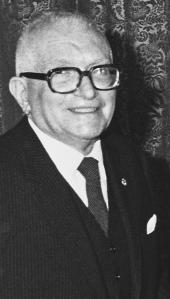
- Born: 9 November 1909; Rome, Italy
- Died: 7 February 1995 (aged 85); Rome, Italy

Academic background
- Education: Sapienza University of Rome

Academic work
- Discipline: Archeology
- Sub-discipline: Etruscan studies
- Institutions: Sapienza University of Rome, Soprintendenza alle antichità di Roma, National Etruscan Museum, University of Cagliari

Massimo Pallottino (9 November 1909 in Rome – 7 February 1995 in Rome) was an Italian archaeologist specializing in Etruscan civilization and art.

== Biography ==
Pallottino was a student of Giulio Quirino Giglioli and worked early in his career on the Temple of Apollo at Veii. In essence Pallottino created the modern discipline of Etruscology and trained many of its leading practitioners. He published a massive corpus of material during his career and established a research center in Rome, today known as C.N.R. per l'Archeologia etrusco-italica. He was also influential in establishing the Istituto Nazionale di Studi Etruschi e Italici and its journal, Studi Etruschi. His own work covered Etruscan art and culture, civilization, and language. One of his most influential works was the handbook Etruscologia originally published in 1942 in Milan, but today available in numerous languages and still consulted by scholars and students alike. Pallottino was a member of the faculty of the Università di Roma, "La Sapienza".

In 1937, Pallottino wrote an article debunking the so-called "Etruscan Warrior" purchased by the Metropolitan Museum of Art (by John Marshall under the direction of Gisela M. A. Richter), as a forgery. Richter remained unconvinced, but Pallottino was ultimately proven correct by the scholar Harold Parsons in 1961. Pallottino pointed out the Greek Hellenized world from which Etruscan art emerged. He wrote the volume on Etruscan Painting (1952) for Albert Skira's series on Great Centuries of Painting. In 1971 his Civiltà artistica etrusco-italica summarized the previous two generations of work in Italian archaeology.

He won the Balzan Prize in 1982 for Sciences of Antiquity: "For his research work and discoveries of outstanding importance carried out in the field of the sciences of antiquity through the excavation of Pyrgi, his contribution to the interpretation of the Etruscan language and his revealing research on the origins of ancient Rome and the peoples of pre-Roman Italy" (motivation of the Balzan General Prize Committee). This included the momentous discovery of the Pyrgi plaques.

Pallottino died of a heart attack at his home in Rome on 7 February 1995. In 1997 Pallottino's memory and career were honored with the publication of a two-volume set, Etrusca et Italica: Scritti in ricordo di Massimo Pallottino. Among his students was Giovanni Colonna, one of the leading figures in current Etruscology.

== Bibliography ==
1. Arte figurativa e ornamentale. Rome: C. Colombo, 1940.
2. Etruscologia. Milan: Hoepli, 1942 (English ed., The Etruscans. David Ridgway, editor. Bloomington, IN: Indiana University Press, 1975).
3. L’origine degli Etruschi. Rome: Tumminelli, 1947.
4. Etruscan Painting. Geneva: Skira, 1952.
5. Massimo Pallottino, notes by Hans and I. Jucker, photos by Walter Dräyer and Martin Hürlimann. Art of the Etruscans. London: Thames and Hudson, 1955
6. Mostra dell’arte e della civiltà etrusca. Milan: Silvana, 1955.
7. Che cos’è l’archeologia. Florence: Sansoni, 1963 (English ed., The Meaning of Archaeology. New York: H. N. Abrams 1968).
8. Civiltà artistica etrusco-italica. Florence: Sansoni, 1971.
9. A History of Earliest Italy. Michigan, 1991.
10. Origini e storia primitiva di Roma, Milano: Rusconi, 1993.
