= Peppino Pisanu =

Italian serial killer

- Born: 1942 (age 83–84); Mores, Sardinia, Italy
- Other name: "The Monster of Fossano"
- Convictions: Murder x3 Attempted murder
- Penalty: 3 years (1964); 27 years and 3 months (1972) unknown (1998)

Details
- Victims: 3
- Span of crimes: 1972–1998
- Country: Italy
- State: Piedmont
- Date apprehended: For the final time in March 1998

Peppino Pisanu (born 1942), known as The Monster of Fossano (Italian: Il Mostro di Fossano), is an Italian serial killer. Convicted and sentenced to 27 years imprisonment for killing his sister-in-law and his mother-in-law in Fossano, he was released on parole in 1998, whereupon he killed another woman in Turin.

== Early life and initial attacks ==
Little is known Pisanu's early life. Born in 1942 in the comune of Mores in Sardinia, he moved to Genoa at an early age. As an adult, he started working in a factory, and after being hospitalized during a workplace accident, he first met another worker named Maria Spugnuolo, who had also coincidentally been injured. The two continued talking to one another after their recovery, and eventually began a romantic relationship. After some time, they decided that they would marry one another, with Pisanu moving in into the boarding house where Spagnuolo and her mother resided.

On June 17, 1963, after returning home from work, Pisanu started eating and drinking excessively. In the midst of his doing this, Maria and her sister Delia arrived in the house and happened upon him, causing the former to get very angry with him and slap him. Angered, Pisanu grabbed a knife and attempted to stab both women, but was unsuccessful. He was soon apprehended and charged with two counts of attempted murder and attempted assault, for which he was imprisoned for several years.

=== Double murder ===
After serving several years, Pisanu was released sometime in either late 1967 or early 1968, where he soon after married 36-year-old Angela Masala, a fellow emigrant from Sardinia. The couple had two children - Monica and Massimiliano - and settled in Fossano, where Pisanu found work as a laborer. The spouses' relationship quickly deteriorated over the years, as Pisanu proved to be very violent and controlling towards his wife, constantly beating her and locking her in her house for weeks at a time.

Masala eventually got fed up with the abuse, taking their son and fleeing to her parents' home on Corso Regina Elena. Pisanu proceeded to harass them on several different occasions, demanding that they return his son and threatening to retaliate if they refused. On March 19, Pisanu went to the house again, but after his demands were rejected yet again, he found a nearby ladder and climbed inside through a second storey-window. His 74-year-old father-in-law, Antonio Masala, was awakened by the noise, but before he could read, he was stabbed multiple times. Afterwards, Pisanu went downstairs and attacked the remaining occupants: his 36-year-old wife Angela, her 38-year-old sister Francesca, their 64-year-old mother Lucia and even his 4-year-old son. Angela, Lucia and Massimiliano received serious injuries, while Francesca had her carotid artery severed, killing her on the spot.

The commotion coming from the house attracted the attention of neighbors, who immediately informed the carabinieri. While everybody was gathering inside the house and attempted to help the injured, the blood-soaked Pisanu escaped. A squad of carabinieri was immediately dispatched to arrest him, which successfully apprehended him after half an hour. Unfortunately, Lucia Masala succumbed to her injuries in hospital, while the remaining victims recovered.

=== Prosecution and imprisonment ===
Immediately afterwards, Pisanu was lodged in a prison, but was soon transferred to a psychiatric facility in Racconigi to undergo a psychiatric evaluation. The results determined that Pisanu suffered from an undisclosed mental illness which prevented prosecutors from seeking a full life term - instead, they requested a 30-year sentence for two counts of murder, three counts of attempted murder, trespassing, battery and illegal possession of a knife.

During the trial, Pisanu expressed no remorse for the crime and blamed his in-laws for the situation, claiming that "if it wasn't for [them], we wouldn't be discussing two deaths here". In his testimony, he claimed that he had been a loving husband and father who had been driven to desperation by his wife's parents, but Angela herself claimed that this was not the case. When she testified, she said that Pisanu was jealous and regularly mistreated her and the children, so much so that both of their children had to be interned at a hospital for tuberculosis treatment, as they were undernourished. Throughout the proceedings, Pisanu appeared completely disinterested and sometimes bored, his face only changing when he heard the prosecutor's request that he sentenced to 30 years imprisonment.

In the end, Pisanu was convicted on all counts and sentenced to 27 years and 3 months imprisonment. In addition to this, Antonio Masala filed a civil lawsuit against him, requesting 6 million lire in damages.

== Release and final murder ==
In late 1997, Pisanu was released on parole and moved to Turin, settling in the San Salvario neighborhood. Within months of his move, he began a romantic relationship with 55-year-old retiree Salvatoricca Olivieri.

On February 17, 1998, he stabbed Olivieri during an argument, due to which she had to be driven to a hospital. Following her death, he was charged with her murder. No information about Pisanu's fate has been documented after that, but it is presumed that he was imprisoned and, if still alive, remains incarcerated to this day.

== See also ==
- List of serial killers by country
