= Julia Carta =

Italian folk healer

Julia Carta (1561-fl. 1605) was an Italian folk healer, active as a cunning woman. She was prosecuted by the Spanish Inquisition on Sardinia for heresy because of alleged witchcraft and devil worship. The heresy trial against her lasted from 1596 and 1605, and is known as the most prominent and documented trials of the Inquisition in Sardinia. She was convicted of heresy. Documentation is however lacking on which punishment she was given and if she was executed or not.

== Biography ==
The information we have about Julia Carta is due to the detailed court records kept in the Archivo Histórico Nacional de España.. She was born in Mores around 1561 to Salvador Casu, a mason, and Giorgia de Ruda Porcu Sini. Information from the trial shows that she grew up in poverty and illiteracy, learning from her mother the typically female activities of coser, hilar and texer and attending church (she used to oyr misa, confessar y comulgar). Her knowledge of magical character she learned from three key figures in her training: her maternal grandmother, Juana Porcu, Thomayna Sanna, and a gypsy woman. From these 3 women he learned the art of making amulets (sas pungas), to prepare healing ointments and diagnostic magical techniques, based on observing flames. At the age of 25, she moved to Siligo because of her marriage to widower Costantino Nuvole, by whom she had seven pregnancies, but only one surviving child, Juan Antonio. At the age of 25, she moved to Siligo because of her marriage to widower Constantine Nuvole, by whom she had seven pregnancies but only one surviving son, Juan Antonio.

She ended up in the meshes of the inquisition because of a denunciation by a girl from Siligo, Barbara De Sogos, who, she reported to the town's parish priest, Baltassar Serra Manca, of hearing her express particular ideas and beliefs about the sacrament of confession. According to these, sins of hecizerìa should not be confessed to the priest, as it would be sufficient to confess them inside a hole in the floor in front of the church altar or at home under the sheet. An initial investigation was therefore initiated on September 19, 1596, and on the 25th of the same month the first witnesses were heard: Domenica Carta Oggiano, Giacomina Enna and Giacomina Zidda. These accused Julia of witchcraft, of casting curses and spells, and of carrying out healing practices by resorting to suffumixes, ointments of a magical nature and amulets.
