= Meilogu =

Coordinates: 40.41°N 8.8°E

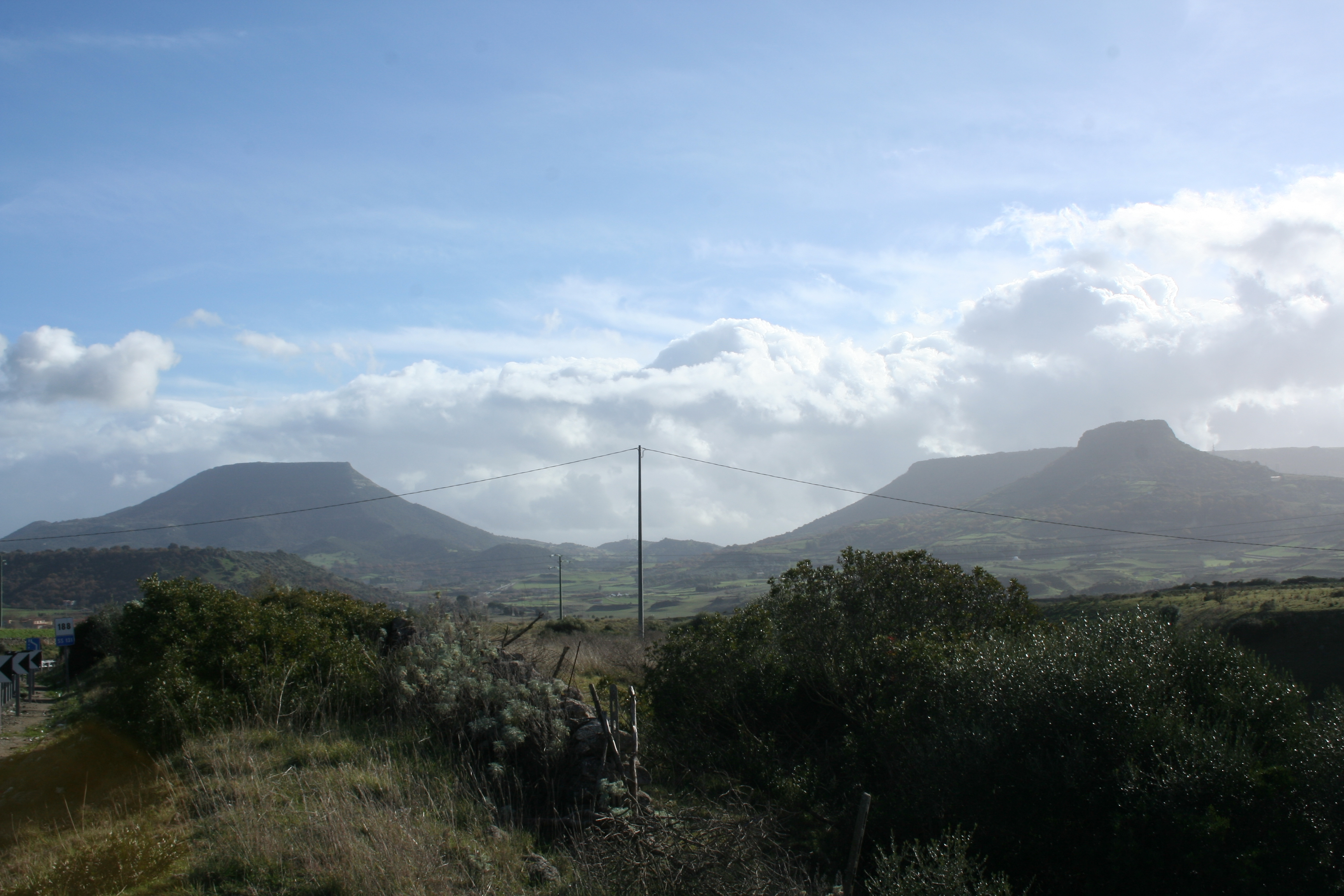
- A view of the mesas of Monte Santo and Monte Pelau in the territory of Siligo

Highest point
- Peak: Monte Santo
- Elevation: 773 m (2,536 ft)

Dimensions
- Area: 596.43 km^{2} (230.28 mi^{2})

Geography
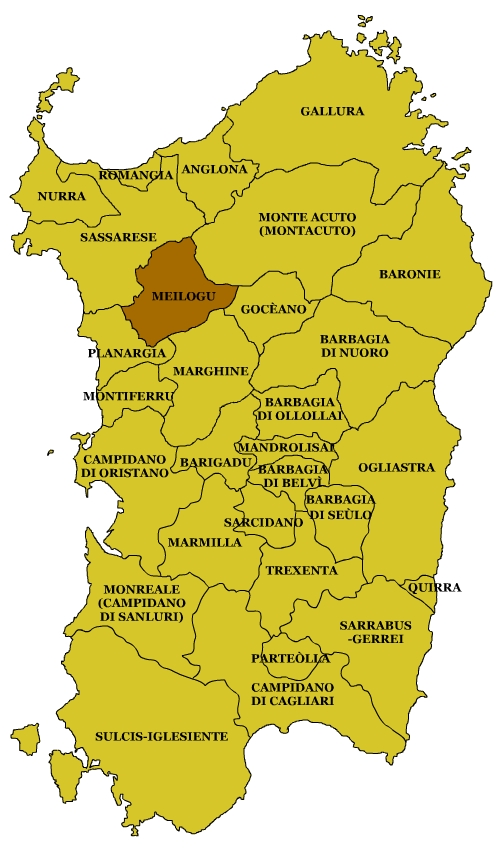
- Localisation of the region of Meilogu in relation to the island of Sardinia
- Country: Italy

Meilogu is a geographical, cultural and natural region located in the northern part of Sardinia, in the province of Sassari, which can be considered a sub-region of Logudoro. It borders to the north with the Sardinian sub-regions of Sassarese, to the east of Montacuto, to the south of the Goceano and Marghine and to the west of the Planargia. Bonorva is the main municipality in the territory.

== Morphology ==
The territory of Meilogu is mainly volcanic and the cinder cones make it unique in the context of a geologically ancient land, so much so that the Italian soldier and naturalist Alberto La Marmora had called it Sardinian Auvergne. Its soils are therefore among the most fertile of the island.

== Bibliography ==
- G. Deriu, L'insediamento umano medioevale nella curatoria di "Costa de Addes" (Comuni di Bonorva e Semestene), Sassari, Magnum, 2000
- S. Ginesu, I vulcani del Logudoro-Mejlogu, Sassari, 1992.
- Alberto La Marmora, Itinéraire de l'ile de Sardaigne, Turin, 1860.
- Alberto La Marmora, Voyage en Sardaigne ou Description statistique, physique et politique de cette ile, avec des recherches sur ses productions naturelles, et ses antiquités. Bertrand, Paris, Bocca, Turin, 1826.
