= Monte Santo (Siligo) =

Mountain in Italy

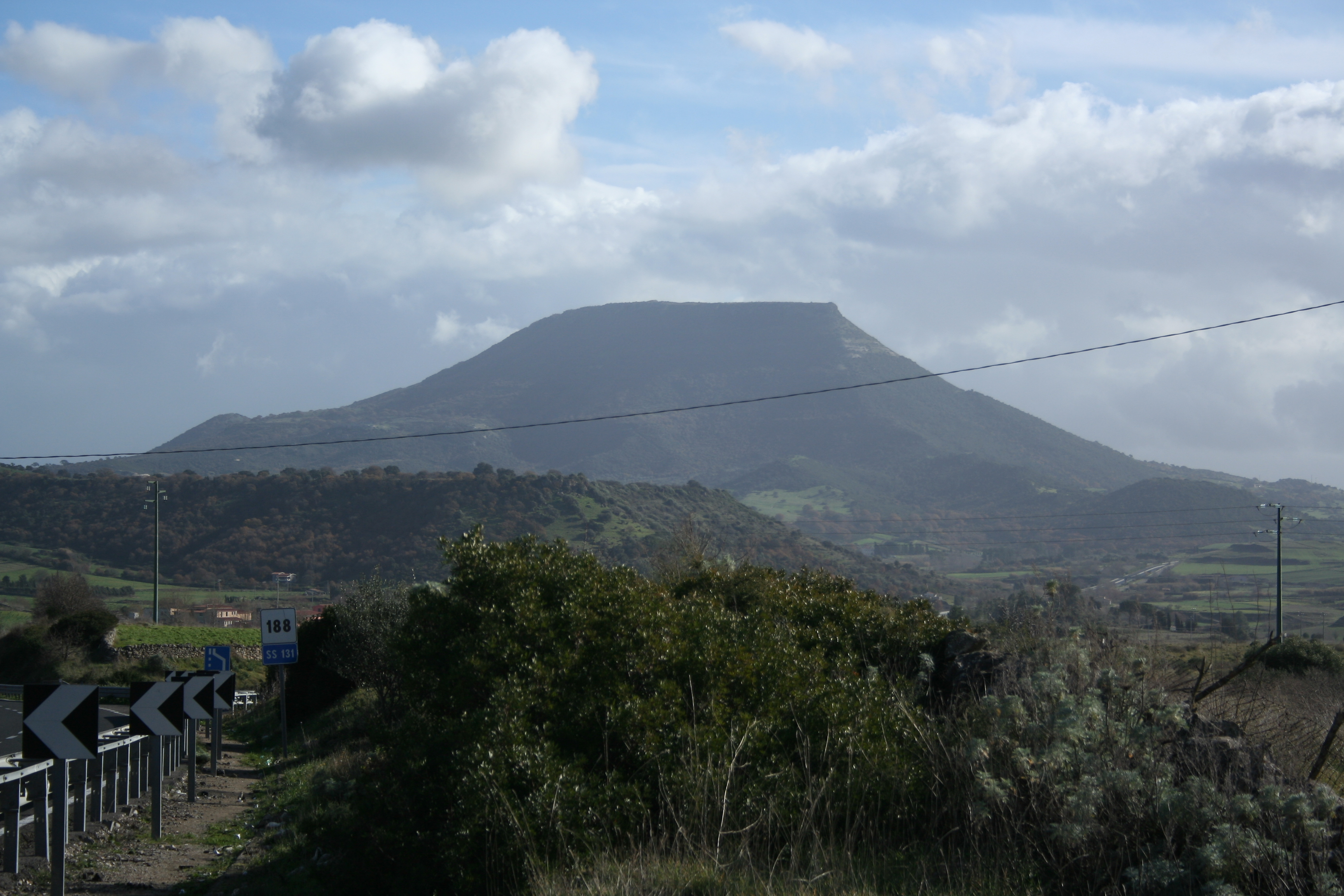

Highest point
- Elevation: 733 m (2,405 ft)
- Coordinates: 40°34′41.52″N 8°46′49.08″E

Naming
- Native name: Monte Santu (Sardinian); Monte Sant'Elies (Sardinian)

Geography
- Location: Sardinia, Italy

Monte Santo (Monte Santu or Monte Sant'Elies in Sardinian language) is an isolated Sardinian mountain and a mesa in Logudoro's northern province of Sassari (Italy). It has an elevation of 733 metres (2,405 ft).

The most substantial portion of the mountain is located in the territory of Siligo. However, some parts belong to the comunes of Ardara, Bonnanaro and Mores.

On the summit plateau is the church of St. Elias and st. Enoch, who appeared in the list of goods in the gift, made in favor of the abbey of Montecassino in eleventh century from Judge Barisone I of Torres
