= Civic Archaeological Museum of Ozieri =

- Civico Museo Archeologico "Alle Clarisse"
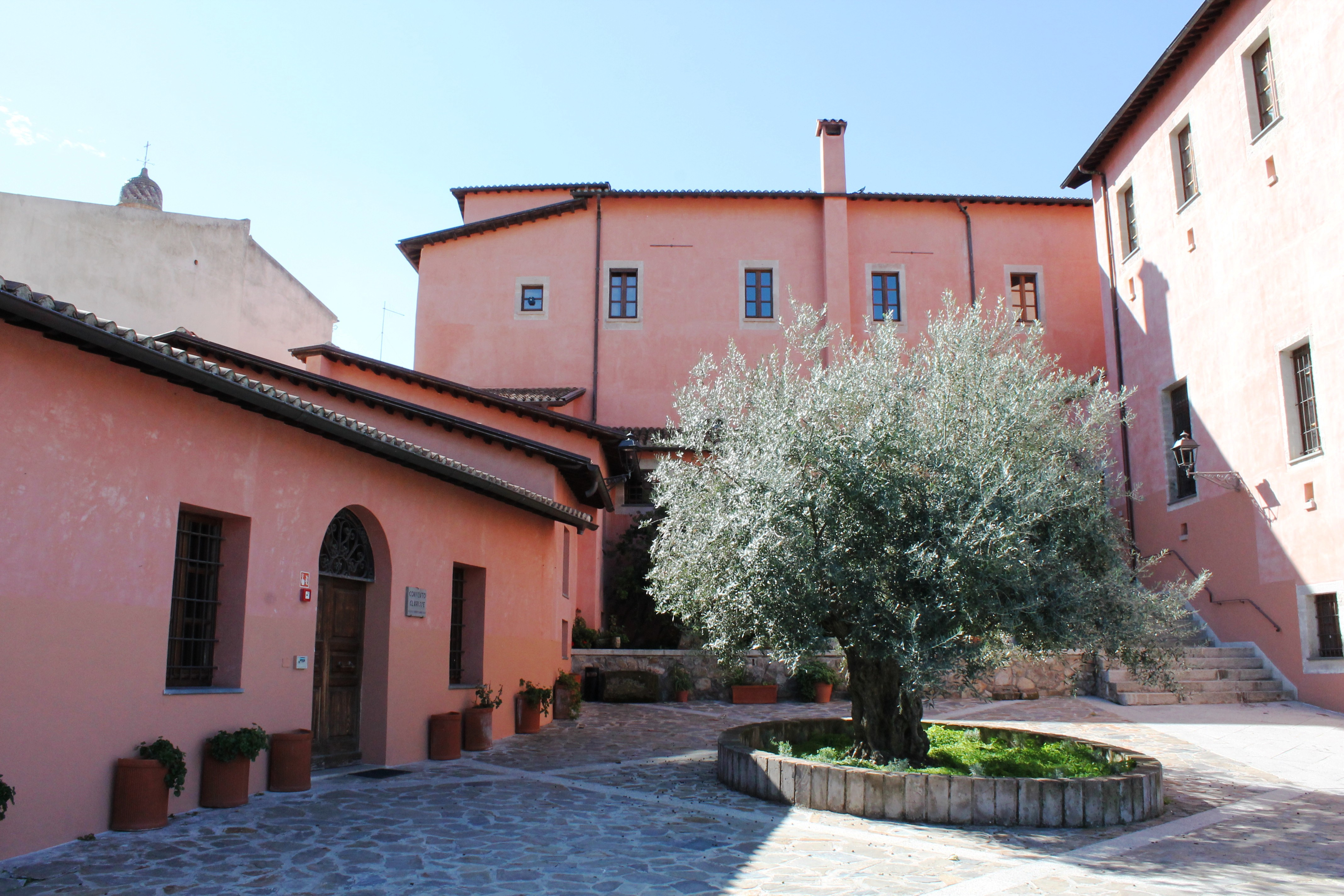
- Museum entrance
- Established: June 29, 1985
- Location: Piazza Baden Powell, Ozieri, Sardinia, Italy
- Type: Archaeological museum
- Collections: Archaeological, numismatic, ethnographic
- Director: Giovanni Frau
- Owner: Municipality of Ozieri
- Website: http://museo.comune.ozieri.ss.it/

The Civic Archaeological Museum "Alle Clarisse" of Ozieri is one of the most important museums in Northern Sardinia. Since 2003 it has been transferred to the former Poor Clares' convent. Its showcases contain the most significant finds found in the municipal area of Ozieri: the materials on display date from prehistoric times to the Modern Age.

== History ==
The Civic Archaeological Museum, inaugurated in 1985 in a Franciscan convent of the sixteenth century, moved in 2003 to the eighteenth-century former convent of the Recoletas de Santa Clara, restored and renovated for that purpose. The convent, officially established in 1753 to house the Poor Clares of Tempio, was instead occupied by the nuns of Orosei, due to the poverty in which they lived. Due to the Ratazzi law, in 1889 the building was requisitioned to house the military, that turned it into the "Pietro Micca" barrack. In 1953 the military left the building and the following year a part of it was donated to the church, while the other part, which remained in the Municipality's ownership, was used for school and social activities and eventually for public housing. Following the regional and European funding for the recovery of monumental buildings, that made it possible, the building was restored and, after the end of the restoration in 2002, became the new headquarters of the Civic Archaeological Museum of Ozieri and for this reason called "Alle Clarisse" ("At the Poor Clares"). The original entrance was located in Azuni street and led to three vaulted rooms, connected to each other and with a large vaulted corridor.

The military moved the entrance exactly on the opposite side: reinforced the old Spanish walls, transforming them in the current ramparts and building an embankment that became the parade ground, built a staircase in granite, which became the main entrance of the structure, and added an upper floor on part of the structure, that for that reason differs from the other part of the structure, being covered by Piedmontese-style timber trusses.

== Exhibition itinerary ==
Outside: Courtyard – in the courtyard there is a small lapidary, that houses an arched stele from a Giants' grave, the Nuragic basins and the lintel of the rural Church of S. Luca.

First floor:

ROOM I: Prehistory (Pre-Nuragic Sardinia) – The Middle Neolithic (4,900 – 4,400 BC) is represented by ceramics, a mother goddess in bone and a stone ring from the Bariles, Baldosa and Bisarcio sites. The Late Sardinian Neolithic (4,100 – 3,500 BC), mainly characterized by the San Michele or Ozieri culture, is represented by materials coming mainly from the cave of the same name and from the contiguous one of Mara, that return a panorama of the imaginative ceramics of the period belonging to both the horizon of the S. Ciriaco Late Neolithic and the classical Ozieri phase of the final Neolithic, among all the famous Pyx, and the early Sub – Ozieri Eneolithic.

ROOM II: The Nuragic civilization – This room is dedicated to the territory during the Nuragic civilization, which spans from the Bronze and Iron ages up to the Roman one. The presence of metal deposits and agro-pastoral resources and their exploitation caused an important frequentation of the area, evidenced today by 123 nuraghes and other monuments of the time. The ceramics, including braziers, boilers, askòs, loom weights and spindles, stone tools, such as mortars, smoothers, millstones and mammillary ashlars speak of diversified activities. The Aegean – Cypriot ingot from Bisarcio, and other finds made up of metal objects, document the importance of the territory, which was placed at the center of communication routes already in the prehistoric age.

ROOM III: The Phoenician – Punic and Roman age – The Phoenician – Punic age finds in the area are sporadic and consist of coins and a few ceramic fragments. The remaining finds exhibited in the room come from settlements and constructions from the Roman era, that marks a reduction in the number of inhabitants, some in continuity with the previous ones, others newly planted and unrelated to local models. Important epigraphic documents are the stele of Ferentius from Cuzi and two milestones, which together with the three bridges over the Mannu river qualify the territory as an important transit and connection point between Turris and Olbia on the route that from Cagliari reached the port on the Tyrrhenian Sea. Also exhibited are materials from a votive stipe, a bust of Sarda Ceres, balsam pieces, glass finds, cinerary urns from a necropolis, in particular from Bisarcio, Punta 'e Navole, Sa Mandra 'e sa Jua and Ruinas

ROOM IV: Medieval section – The Byzantine and Early Middle Ages are illustrated by the pyramidal bezel rings, buckles, earrings, fibulae from Bisarcio as well as by the edges and walls of large jars from various locations, as they survived until the 17th and 18th century. Fragments of archaic Pisan majolica, Catalan and Valencian lustres and other ceramics, both indigenous and from the Italian peninsula, are also exhibited, along with objects in bone and ivory of apotropaic use

Second floor:

NUMISMATIC SECTION: The numismatic collection contains about six thousand coins that came from many storerooms and findings in the area. The collection, divided into four rooms, ranges from Greek and Punic coins to coins from the Savoy era, demonstrating the continuity of frequentation of the territory over the centuries.

ETHNOGRAPHIC SECTION: The ethnographic section is made up of material from private donations. The Bandini collection consists of portraits and personal objects of the magistrate Pietro Cosseddu – Virdis and the noblewoman Annetta de Raimondi. The Marinelli donation is also made up of portraits and other objects that belonged to General Giannino Baroncelli. The Gallisay – Carta collection brings together scores, autographed manuscripts and prints by the musician Priamo Gallisay. The Manchia collection, on the other hand, is made up of traditional clothes, dating back to the early twentieth century.

== See also ==
- Ozieri
- Ozieri culture
- Bisarcio

== Bibliography ==
- AA.VV. (1985). Museo archeologico Ozieri (in Italian). Sassari. OCLC 492737777.
- Campus, Lucrezia (2013). Il museo archeologico di Ozieri (in Italian). Sassari: Carlo Delfino editore. ISBN 978-88-7138-295-1. OCLC 869199531.
