= Mores, Sardinia =

Mores
- Comune
- Comune di Mores
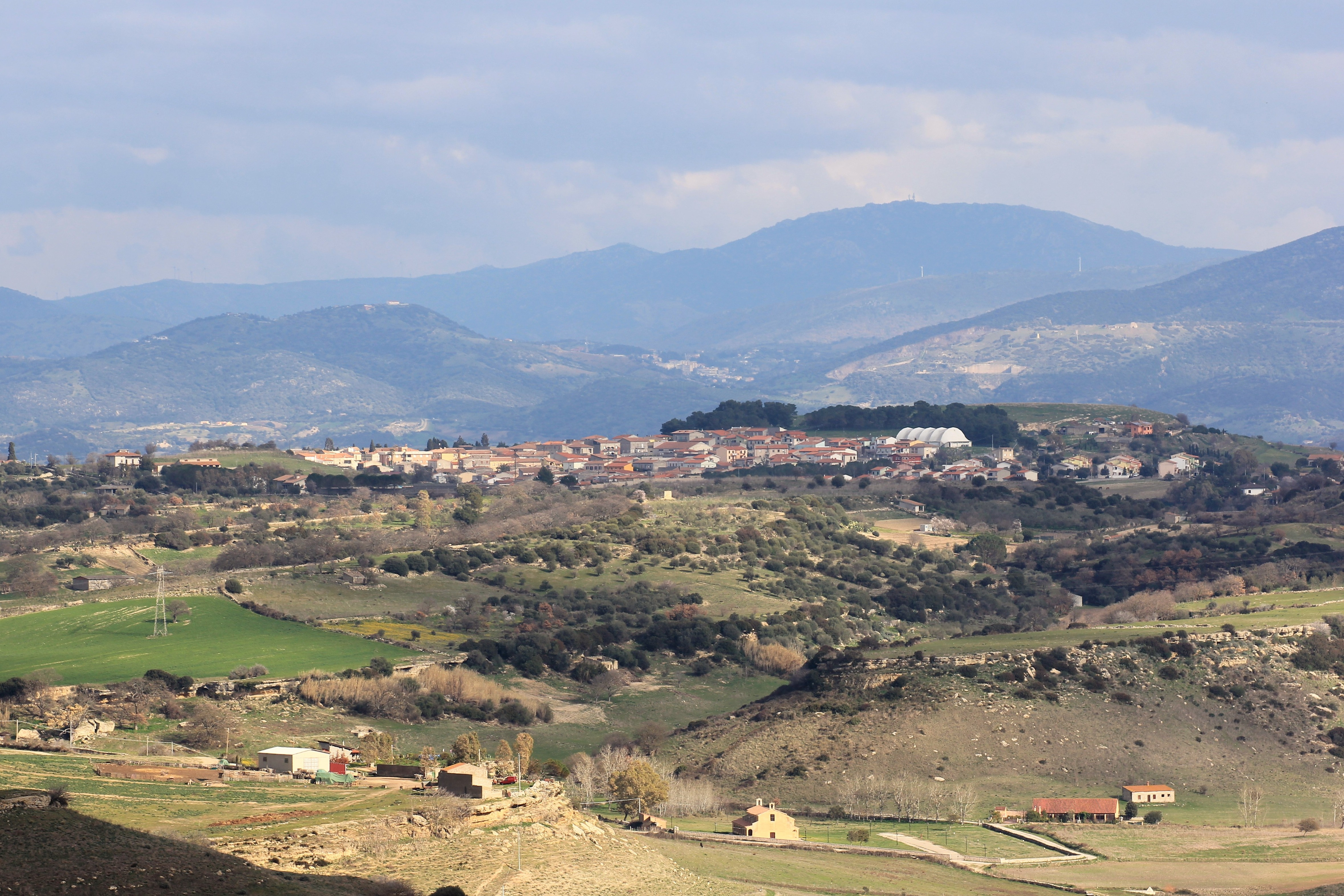
- View of Mores

- Location within Sardinia
- Coordinates: 40°33′N 8°50′E
- Country: Italy
- Region: Sardinia
- Metropolitan city: Sassari (SS)

Government
  - Mayor: Enrico Virdis

Area
  - Total: 94.86 km^{2} (36.63 sq mi)

Population (2026)
  - Total: 1,663
  - Density: 17.53/km^{2} (45.41/sq mi)
- Demonym: Moresi
- Time zone: UTC+1 (CET)
  - Summer (DST): UTC+2 (CEST)
- Postal code: 07013
- Dialing code: 079

Mores is a town and comune (municipality) in the Metropolitan City of Sassari in the autonomous island region of Sardinia in Italy, located about 150 kilometres (93 mi) north of Cagliari and about 30 kilometres (19 mi) southeast of Sassari. It has 1,663 inhabitants.

Located at the bottom of Mount Lachesos, Mores is home to two thousand residents.

Mores borders the municipalities of Ardara, Bonnanaro, Bonorva, Ittireddu, Ozieri, Siligo, and Torralba.

== Demographics ==
As of 2026, the population is 1,663, of which 50.0% are male, and 50.0% are female. Minors make up 12.8% of the population, and seniors make up 28.4%.

Historical population

Year	Pop.	±%
1861	2,370	—
1871	2,412	+1.8%
1881	2,494	+3.4%
1901	3,121	+25.1%
1911	2,704	−13.4%
1921	2,744	+1.5%
1931	2,958	+7.8%
1936	3,134	+5.9%

Year	Pop.	±%
1951	3,314	+5.7%
1961	3,095	−6.6%
1971	2,364	−23.6%
1981	2,255	−4.6%
1991	2,211	−2.0%
2001	2,074	−6.2%
2011	1,945	−6.2%
2021	1,758	−9.6%

Source: ISTAT

=== Immigration ===
As of 2025, immigrants make up 5.6% of the population. The 5 largest foreign countries of birth are Morocco, Germany, Romania, Switzerland, and France.

== Twin towns ==
Mores is twinned with:

- Santa Giuletta, Italy
