= Santa Maria del Regno =

Church in Sassari, Italy

Coordinates: 40°37′27″N 8°48′37″E

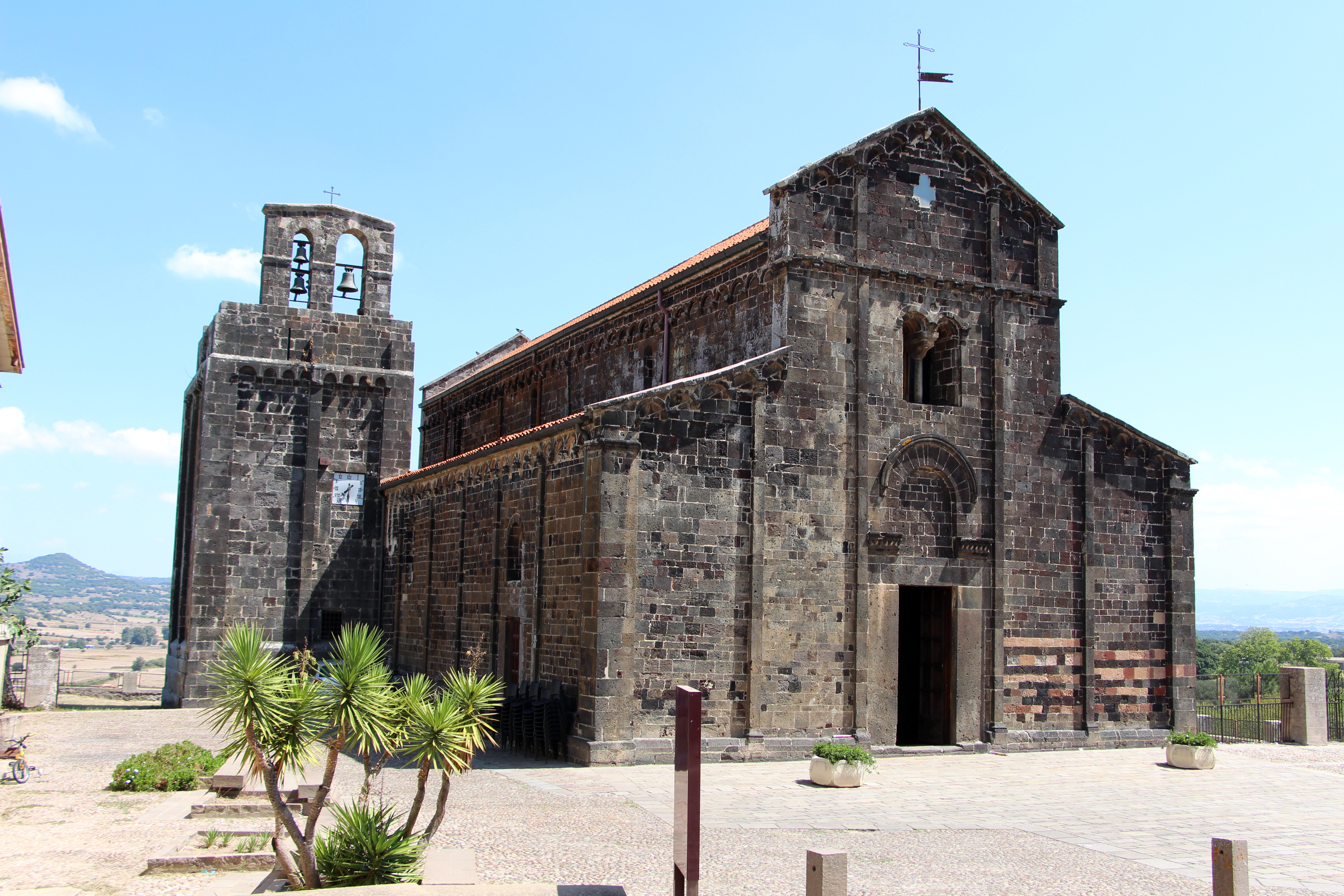
Façade.

Santa Maria del Regno is a Romanesque church in Ardara, province of Sassari, Sardinia, Italy.

== History ==
The church, together with the annexed castle of which ruins remain today, was built in the 11th century by Giorgia, daughter of the Giudice of Torres, as a Palace Chapel. The church is mentioned in the Libellus Judicum Turritanorum of the 13th century.

== Overview ==
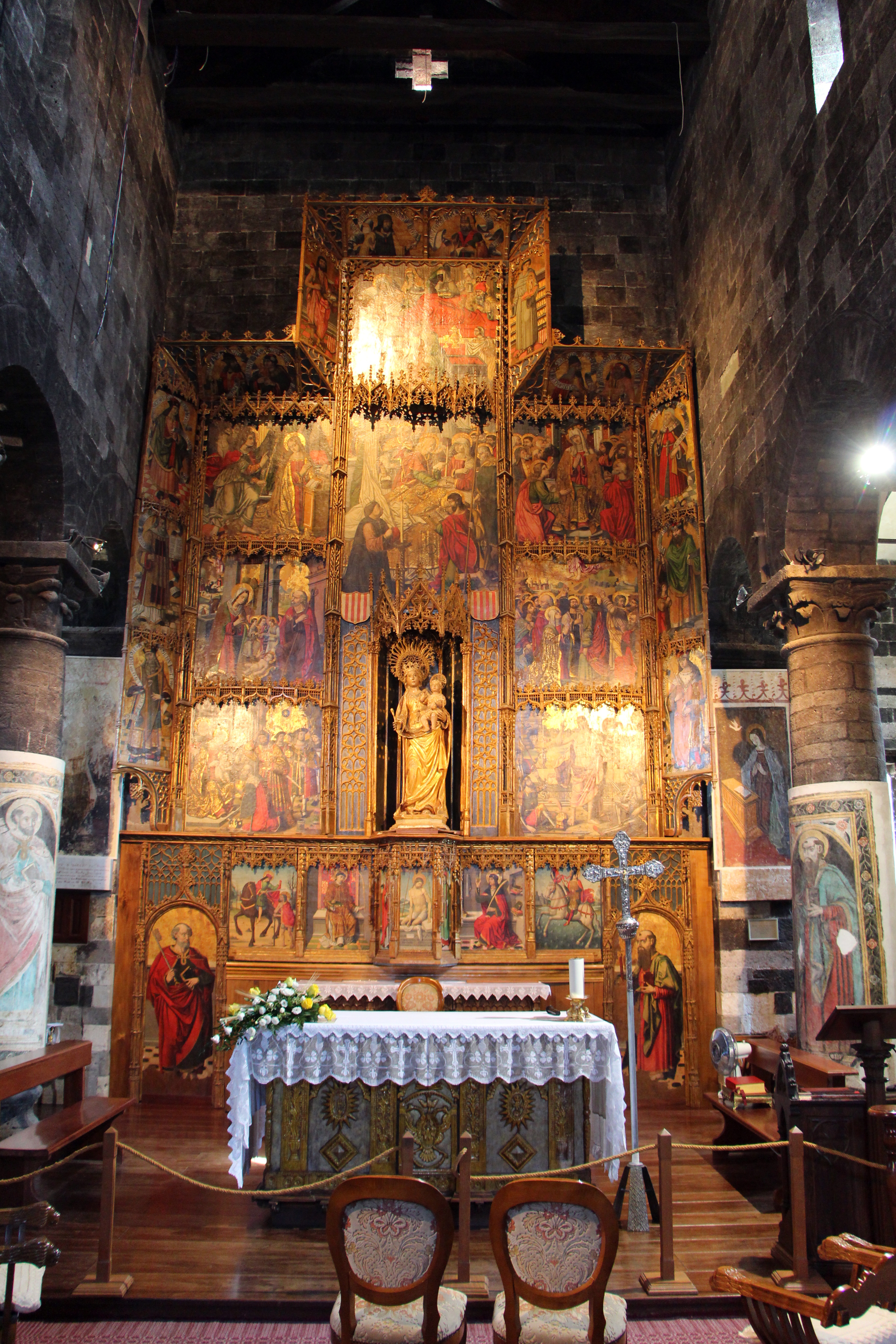
Retable

The church was built in dark basalt stone by Pisan workers (the island in the Middle Ages was under strong influence from the maritime Republic of Pisa). The façade is divided into five sectors and has a salient-shaped façade. In the middle is the portal, surmounted by a double mullioned window. The whole exterior of the edifice is characterized by false columns (lesenes) and Lombard bands; on the right are the remains of the square bell tower, which is missing the upper part.

The interior, on a rectangular plan, has a nave and two aisles divided by columns whose capitals have flower motifs. The nave has a wooden trusses ceiling, while the aisles are groin vaulted. In the semi-circular apse is the large retablo, the largest 16th-century polyptych in Sardinia, located behind the high altar. The table portrays several prophets and saints, as well as episodes in the life of the Virgin Mary. In the middle, within a niche, is the wooden statue of Nostra Signora del Regno, a "Madonna with Child" wearing royal symbols. The polyptych is dated 1515.

The church's columns have 17th-century paintings with Apostles and other Saints, while also present is a lesser retablo from the same school, a carved wooden pulpit and an epigraph celebrating the consecration of the church on May 7, 1107.

== Sources ==
- Coroneo, Roberto (1993). Architettura Romanica dalla metà del Mille al primo '300. Nuoro: Ilisso. ISBN 88-85098-24-X.
