= Efisio Arru =

Efisio Arru (Siligo, 1927 – Sassari, 2000) was an Italian scientist, from Sardinia. He graduated from the Veterinary Faculty of the University of Sassari in 1957, and in 1978 was appointed Professor of Parasitology at that university. Efisio Arru played a role in the study of parasitology in Italy, in particular the study and the fight against Echinococcus.
