= Siligo =

- Comune
- Comune di Siligo
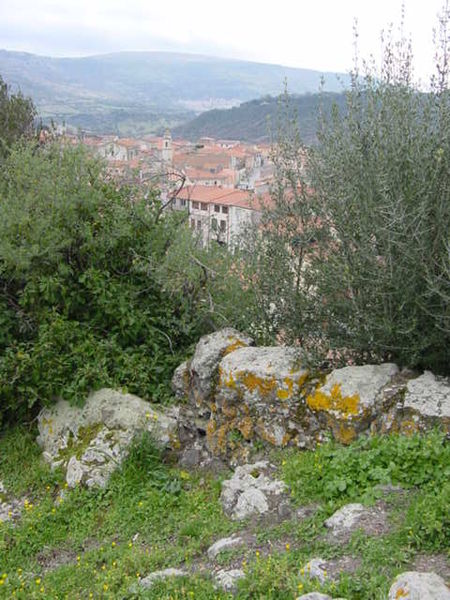

- Coat of arms

- Location within Sardinia
- Coordinates: 40°35′N 8°44′E
- Country: Italy
- Region: Sardinia
- Metropolitan city: Sassari (SS)

Government
  - Mayor: Giovanni Porcheddu

Area
  - Total: 43.45 km^{2} (16.78 sq mi)
- Elevation: 400 m (1,300 ft)

Population (30 May 2024)Istat
  - Total: 725
  - Density: 16.7/km^{2} (43.2/sq mi)
- Demonym: Silighesi
- Time zone: UTC+1 (CET)
  - Summer (DST): UTC+2 (CEST)
- Postal code: 07040
- Dialing code: 079
- Patron saint: St. Victoria
- Saint day: 23 December
- Website: Official website

Siligo is a comune (municipality) in the region of Logudoro - Meilogu in the Metropolitan City of Sassari in the Italian region Sardinia, located about 160 kilometres (99 mi) north of Cagliari and about 25 kilometres (16 mi) southeast of Sassari.

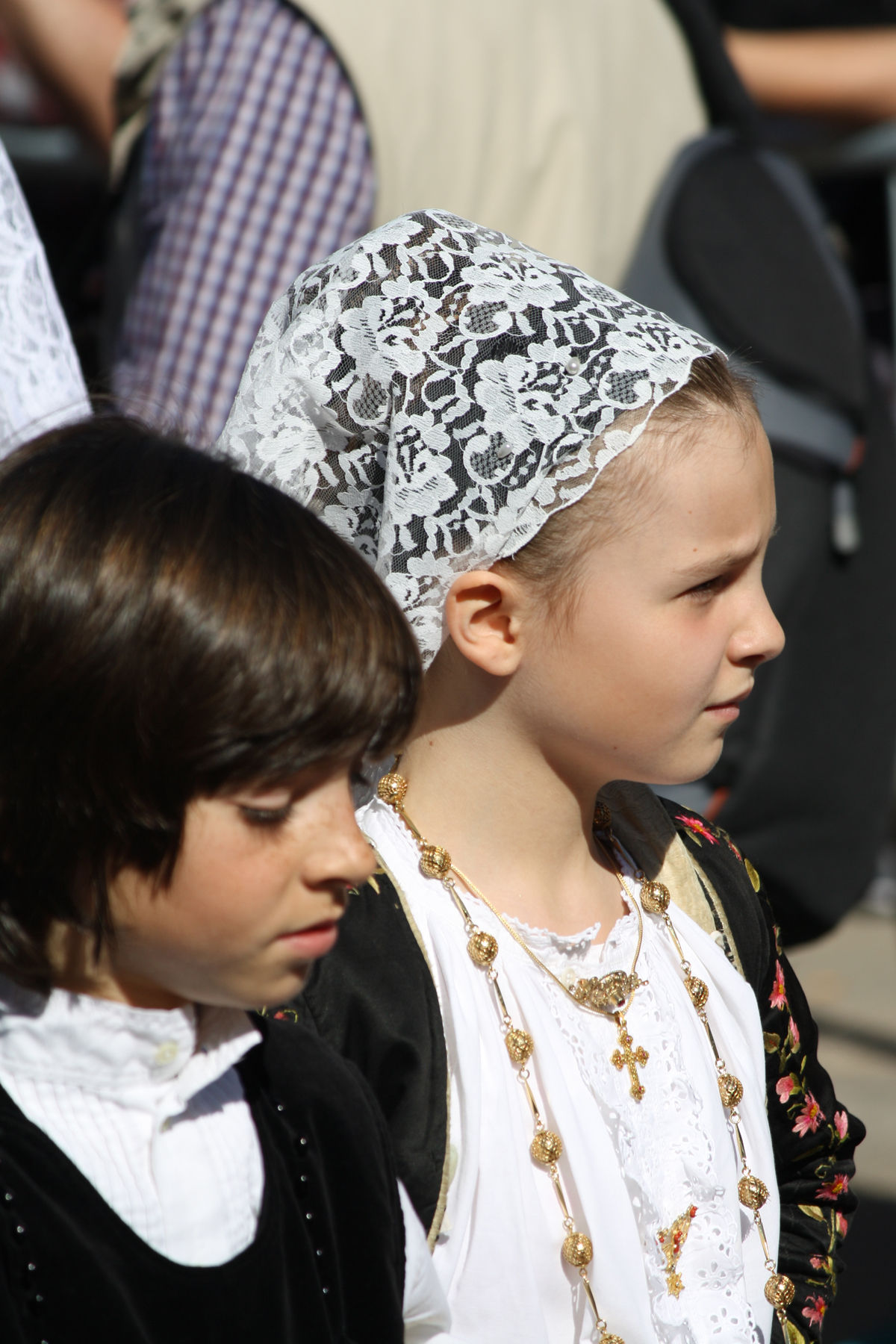
Children in traditional costume from Siligo.

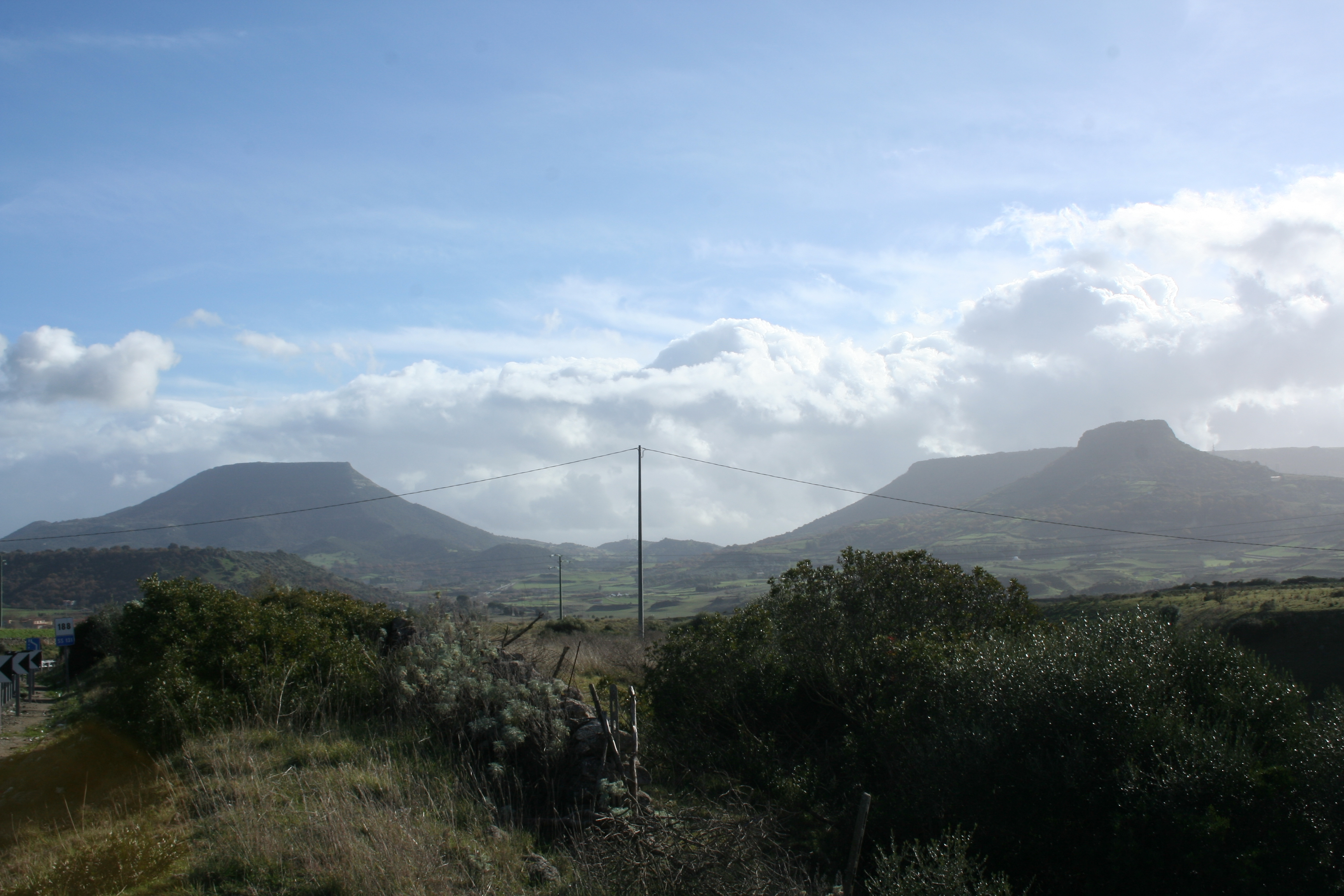
The mesas of Monte Santo and Monte Pelau.

Siligo borders the following municipalities: Ardara, Banari, Bessude, Bonnanaro, Codrongianos, Florinas, Mores, Ploaghe.

== Main sights ==
- Archeological site of Monte sant'Antoni: a prehistoric Federal Nuragic Sanctuary
- Mesumundu Archaeological Park: an old Roman area and medieval
- Church of Nostra Segnora de Mesumundu, built in the Byzantine age (6th century AD) upon the ruins of a Roman baths (2nd century AD). The church was modified after 1065 by the Benedictine monks of Montecassino.
- Church of Santi Elia ed Enoch: built on the top of the Monte Santo and modified by Benedictine monks after 1065.

== People ==
- Gavino Contini (1855-1915), poet
- Rita Livesi, (1915), actress
- Efisio Arru, (1927-2000), scientist
- Maria Carta (1934-1994), folk singer and actress
- Gavino Ledda, author of an autobiographical work Padre padrone (1975)
