= Gavino Contini =

Sardinian poet (1855–1915)

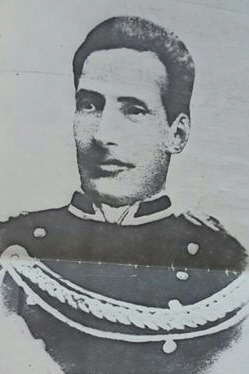
- Born: 12 December 1855; Siligo, Kingdom of Sardinia
- Died: 24 July 1915 (aged 59); Siligo, Kingdom of Italy

Gavino Contini (in Sardinian, Gavinu Còntene) ((12 December 1855 – 24 July 1915)) was a Sardinian poet, was probably the greatest exponent of improvised poetry of Sardinia, certainly the most beloved.

== Life and work ==
He was born in Siligo in a modest house in the oldest part of the village. After attending three years of elementary school, he devoted himself to work in the fields with his father, but he had always cultivated her passion for reading history books and poetry. In 1875 was enlisted in the Corps of the Royal Guard and was stationed in Rome. In a poetry contest for Victor Emmanuel II's birthday was awarded in recognition of his art, a life annuity. Forced by illness in 1890 left the Corps and returned to Siligo where he lived with his sisters Raimonda and Anatolia, and from that moment he devoted himself entirely to poetry.

== Collections of poetry ==
- Antonio Carta (a cura di), Poesie/Gavino Contini, Sassari, 1967
- Don Giommaria Dettori (a cura di), Gavinu Contene, 1983
- Antonio Cuccu (a cura di), Gavinu Contini cun sa morte. – Cenni sulla vita del povero agricoltore, Cagliari, s.d.
- G. Contini, Esistentzia e onnipotentzia de Deus. Critica contr'a Moretti e Poddighe, Cagliari, Litotip. TEA.

== Find more about Gavino Contini ==
wikisource
