= Sant'Antioco di Bisarcio =

Church in Ozieri, Sardinia, Italy

Coordinates: 40°38′40″N 8°53′33″E

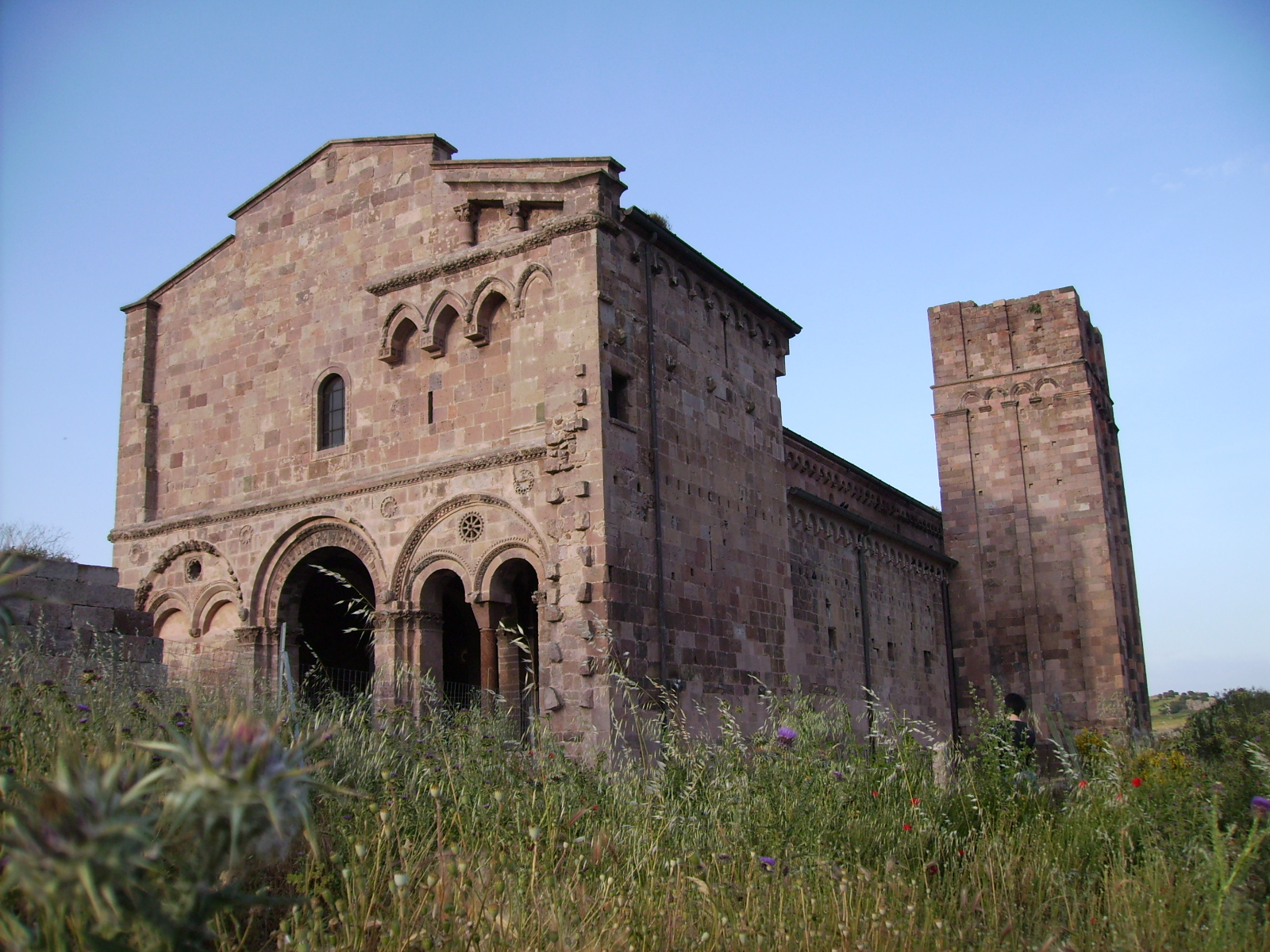
The Basilica of Sant'Antioco di Bisarcio.

The Basilica di Sant'Antioco of Bisarcio is a countryside church near Chilivani, a frazione of Ozieri, Sardinia, Italy. Located on an isolated volcanic hill, it is one of the largest Romanesque churches in Sardinia.

A Catholic diocese with seat in Bisarcium, in what was then the giudicato of Torres (one of the four independent quasi-kingdoms in which Sardinia was divided) or Guisarchium is documented from 1065 to 1503, when it was annexed to that of Alghero. A first cathedral was built here in the late 11th century, but was later damaged by a fire, so that a document from 1139 suggests that the bishop had moved his seat to Ardara. The new cathedral was finished in 1174, when the two storey portico on the façade was completed. Today scanty remains of the medieval village of Bisarcio exist.

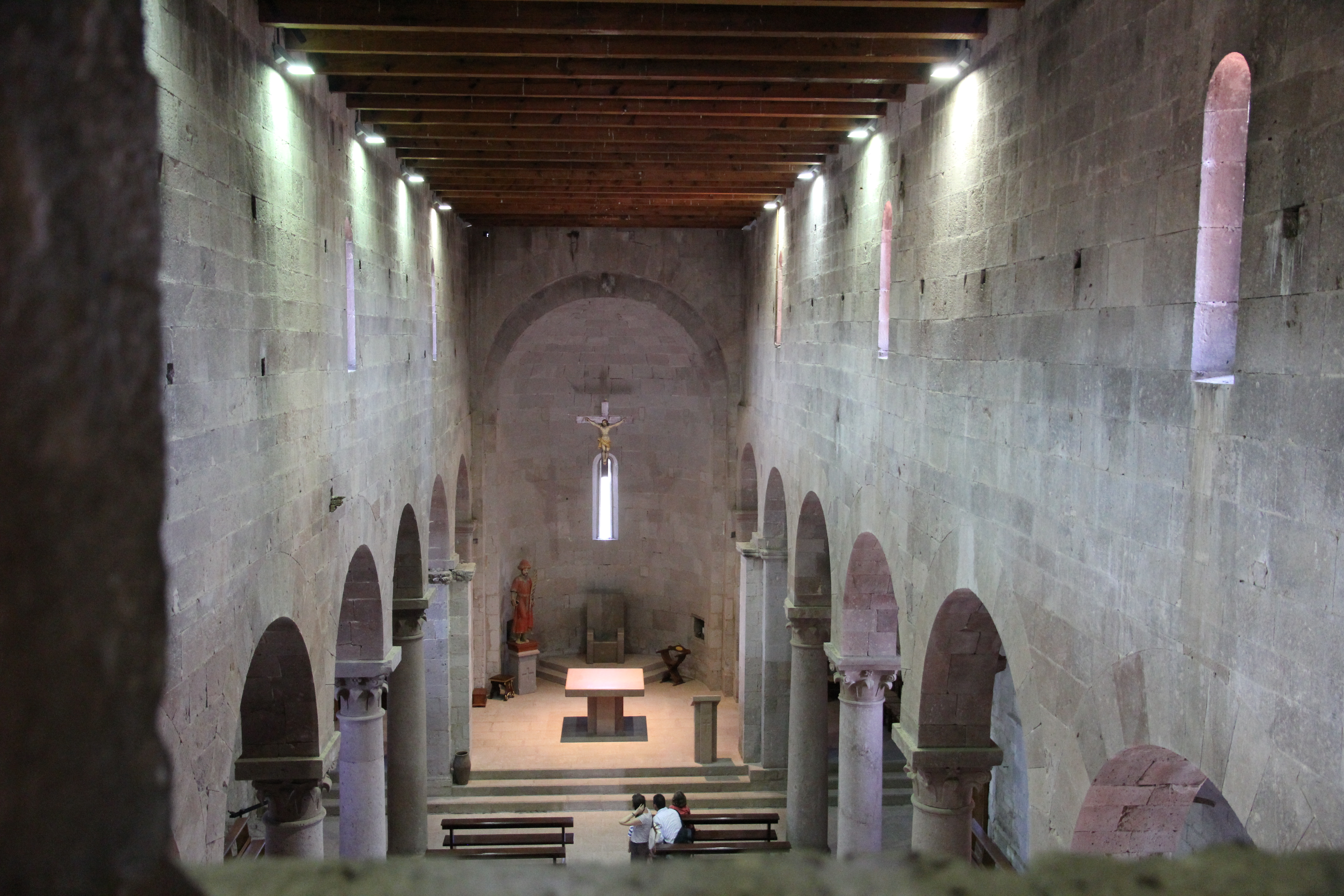
Interior.

== Overview ==
The church shows clear influences from the workers who were called to build it, and which belonged to the Lombard and Pisane schools. The portico, inspired by French models, has a lower storey with three rounded arcades, two of which included mullioned window (the left one closed). The middle arcade leads to the narthex, which has six groin vaults supported by cruciform piers. On the narthex' right side is a staircase leading to the upper floor with three rooms, the central of which, provided with an altar, was the private chapel of the bishops of Bisarcio.

Behind the altar is a mullioned window opening towards the interior of the cathedral, sided by two decorative lozenges which can be seen also on the exterior walls of the apse, and are typical of the Pisane Romanesque style. The right room houses instead a characteristic mitre-shaped fireplace.

From the narthex is also accessible the true interior of the church, which has a nave and two aisles divided by columns, with a semicircular apse. The nave is covered by wooden trusses, while the aisles are groin-vaulted. Light is provided by narrow single mullioned windows, six in each side plus another in the apse and two at the end of the aisles.

On the southern side is a bell tower, whose upper part is missing after crumbling down in an unknown date. It has a square plan and is decorated by false columns and Lombard bands, which are also present on the church's external sides and apse.

== Sources ==
- Coroneo, Roberto (1993). Architettura Romanica dalla metà del Mille al primo '300. Nuoro: Ilisso. ISBN 88-85098-24-X.
