= Luca Sbisa =

Swiss ice hockey player (born 1990)

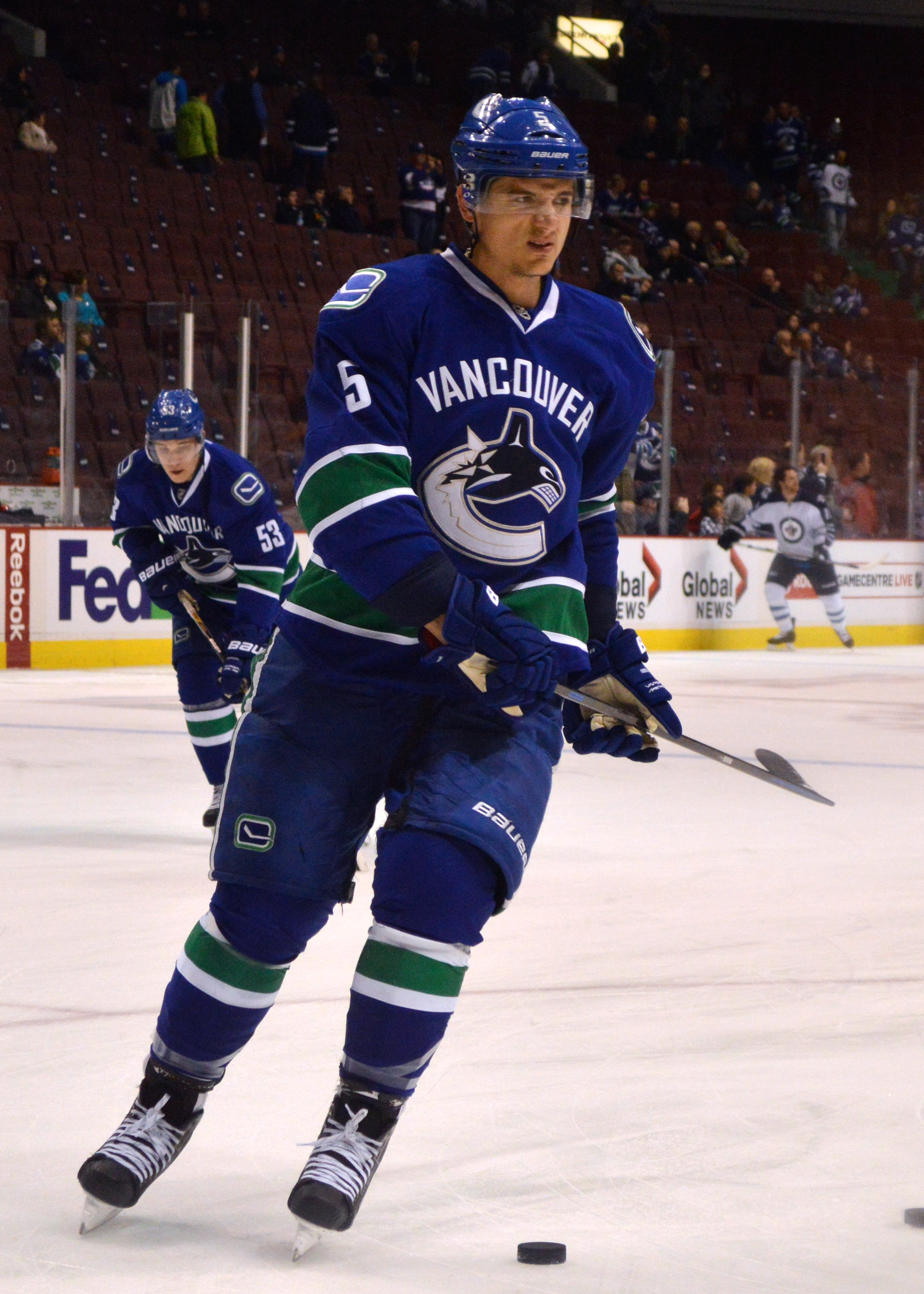
- Sbisa with the Vancouver Canucks in 2015
- Born: 30 January 1990 (age 36) Ozieri, Italy
- Height: 6 ft 3 in (191 cm)
- Weight: 206 lb (93 kg; 14 st 10 lb)
- Position: Defence
- Shot: Left
- Played for: EV Zug; Philadelphia Flyers; Anaheim Ducks; HC Lugano; Vancouver Canucks; Vegas Golden Knights; New York Islanders; Winnipeg Jets; Nashville Predators
- National team: Switzerland
- NHL draft: 19th overall, 2008; Philadelphia Flyers
- Playing career: 2006–2021

Luca Sbisa (born 30 January 1990) is an Italian-born Swiss professional ice hockey coach and former player who is the development coach for the San Jose Sharks. He played as a defenceman for the Philadelphia Flyers, Anaheim Ducks, Vancouver Canucks, Vegas Golden Knights, New York Islanders, Winnipeg Jets and Nashville Predators. Sbisa played major junior hockey in Canada with the Lethbridge Hurricanes and Portland Winterhawks of the Western Hockey League (WHL) before being selected by the Flyers in the first round of the 2008 NHL entry draft. He made his NHL debut that year before returning to Lethbridge.

Sbisa has also played for Switzerland in multiple international tournaments, including several International Ice Hockey Federation (IIHF) Ice Hockey World Championships as well as the 2010 Winter Olympics.

== Playing career ==
Sbisa was drafted 19th overall by the Philadelphia Flyers at the 2008 NHL entry draft. On 1 October 2008, Sbisa signed a three-year, entry-level contract with the Flyers. Prior to his entry into the NHL, Sbisa started his hockey career with EV Zug in Switzerland. In the 2006–07 season, he made his debut for that club in the Swiss National League A (NLA). Later, he played with the EHC Seewen in the Swiss Liga. In the summer of 2007, he was drafted in the Canadian Hockey League (CHL)'s annual import draft to the Lethbridge Hurricanes of the Western Hockey League (WHL).

Sbisa joined the Flyers for the start of the 2008–09 season, playing 39 games before being returned to the Hurricanes to complete the season. He returned to the Flyers to play in the 2009 Stanley Cup playoffs. He replaced Daniel Carcillo on a line when Carcillo was suspended for taking a hit on the Pittsburgh Penguins' forward Maxime Talbot during Game 1 of the Eastern Conference Quarter-finals. He was widely regarded as one of the Flyers' top prospects during his tenure in Philadelphia.

At the 2009 NHL entry draft, on 26 June 2009, Sbisa was traded, along with Joffrey Lupul and Philadelphia's 2009 and 2010 first-round picks, to the Anaheim Ducks in exchange for Chris Pronger and Ryan Dingle.

On 16 October 2010, the Ducks sent Sbisa down to their American Hockey League (AHL) affiliate, the Syracuse Crunch, later recalling him on 10 November. Later in the 2010–11 season, on 8 March 2011, Sbisa signed a four-year contract extension with the Ducks, worth $8.7 million with a yearly cap hit of $2.175 million.

On 27 June 2014, Sbisa was traded to the Vancouver Canucks, along with teammate Nick Bonino and a first- and third-round pick in 2014, in exchange for Ryan Kesler and a third-round pick in 2015. On 8 April 2015, the Canucks signed Sbisa to a three-year extension worth $10.8 million.

On 21 June 2017, having been left exposed by the Canucks, Sbisa was selected by the Vegas Golden Knights in the 2017 NHL expansion draft.

During the 2018 off-season, after not being re-signed by the Golden Knights, Sbisa was invited to the New York Islanders training camp on a professional try out contract. He later signed a one-year contract with the Islanders on 24 September 2018.

On 22 October 2019, Sbisa signed a one-year, $750,000 contract to return to the Ducks. The team immediately placed him on waivers, where he was claimed by the Winnipeg Jets on 23 October. Later, on 21 November 2019, Sbisa scored his first goal as a Winnipeg Jet (which was his first goal since he was still a member of the Vegas Golden Knights in the 2017–18 season) in a 5-3 road loss to the Dallas Stars. In the 2019–20 season, Sbisa made 44 appearances with the Jets, posting 2 goals and 10 points.

On 9 October 2020, Sbisa was signed by the Jets to a one-year, $800,000 contract extension. After attending the Jets training camp in preparation for the delayed 2020–21 season, Sbisa was placed on waivers by Winnipeg and subsequently claimed by the Nashville Predators on 12 January 2021.

== International play ==
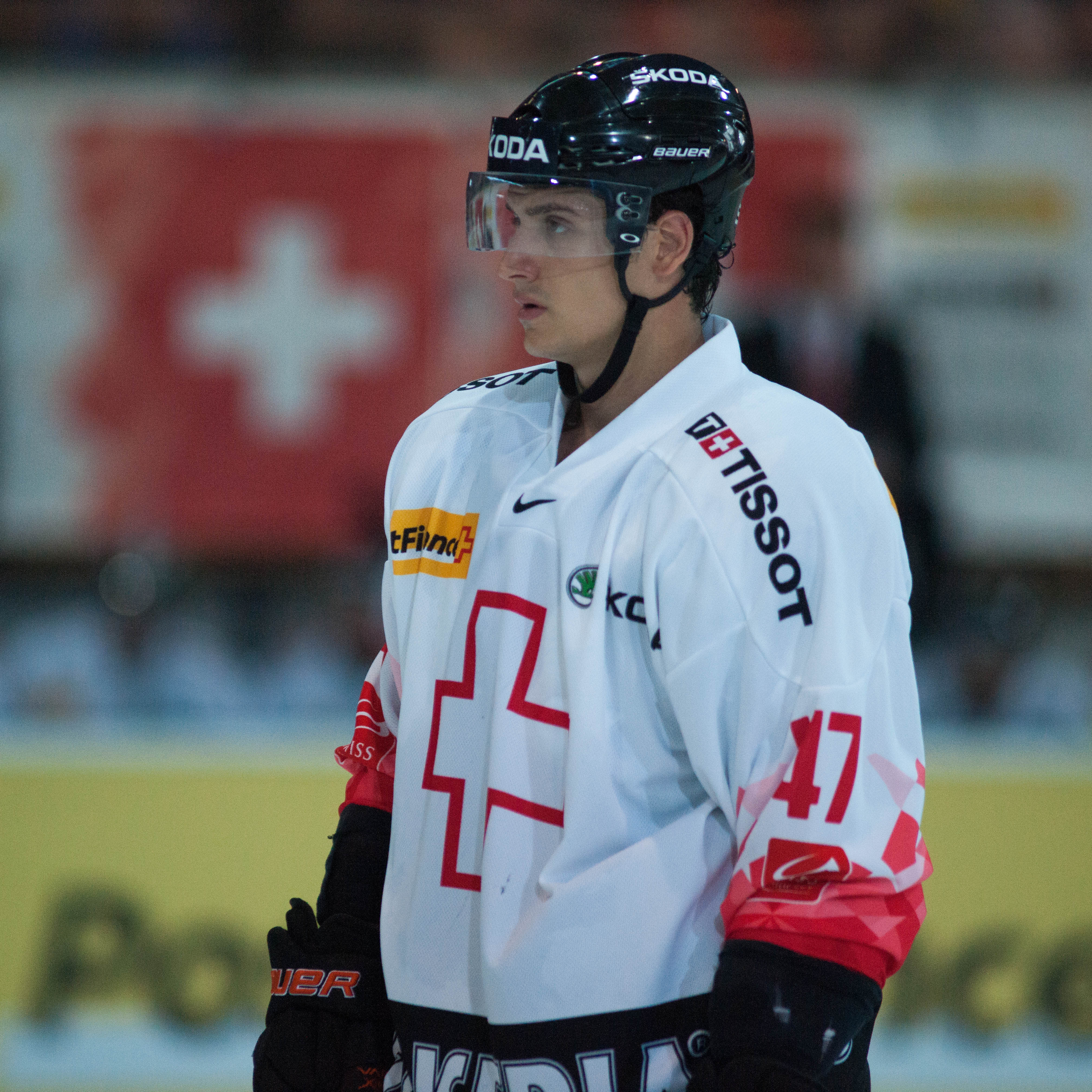
Luca Sbisa at the 2012 IIHF World Championship.

Sbisa played for Switzerland in the 2010 Winter Olympics, where the Swiss finished in eighth place.

== Personal life ==
Sbisa was born in Ozieri, a city on the island of Sardinia, Italy, the first son and second child of Massimo and Isabella Sbisa. He has a sister, Chiara, who is two years older. The Sbisa family moved to Oberägeri, Switzerland, when he was one. At the age of three, his parents took him to a game of EV Zug which made him want to become a hockey player. Sbisa speaks four languages: English, German, Italian and French. On 9 July 2016, Sbisa married long-time girlfriend, Lauren Anaka Sbisa. The two met while he was competing at the 2010 Winter Olympics in Vancouver. In August 2016 they reached the summit of Mount Kilimanjaro in Africa, citing this as a major dream and personal achievement for the pair. On 16 June 2017, Sbisa and his wife had their first child.

== Career statistics ==
=== Regular season and playoffs ===
			Regular season					Playoffs
Season	Team	League	GP	G	A	Pts	PIM	GP	G	A	Pts	PIM
2005–06	EV Zug	SUI U20	18	0	3	3	18	—	—	—	—	—
2006–07	EV Zug	SUI U20	29	5	14	19	28	3	0	0	0	2
2006–07	EV Zug	NLA	7	0	0	0	0	—	—	—	—	—
2006–07	EHC Seewen	SUI.3	6	1	2	3	4	—	—	—	—	—
2007–08	Lethbridge Hurricanes	WHL	62	6	27	33	63	19	3	12	15	17
2008–09	Philadelphia Flyers	NHL	39	0	7	7	36	1	0	0	0	2
2008–09	Lethbridge Hurricanes	WHL	18	4	11	15	19	11	2	1	3	12
2008–09	Philadelphia Phantoms	AHL	2	1	1	2	2	—	—	—	—	—
2009–10	Anaheim Ducks	NHL	8	0	0	0	6	—	—	—	—	—
2009–10	Lethbridge Hurricanes	WHL	17	1	12	13	18	—	—	—	—	—
2009–10	Portland Winterhawks	WHL	12	3	2	5	11	13	2	2	4	26
2010–11	Anaheim Ducks	NHL	68	2	9	11	43	6	0	1	1	8
2010–11	Syracuse Crunch	AHL	8	2	7	9	4	—	—	—	—	—
2011–12	Anaheim Ducks	NHL	80	5	19	24	66	—	—	—	—	—
2012–13	HC Lugano	NLA	30	5	7	12	14	—	—	—	—	—
2012–13	Anaheim Ducks	NHL	41	1	7	8	23	5	0	0	0	4
2013–14	Norfolk Admirals	AHL	4	0	2	2	0	—	—	—	—	—
2013–14	Anaheim Ducks	NHL	30	1	5	6	43	2	0	1	1	5
2014–15	Vancouver Canucks	NHL	76	3	8	11	46	6	1	1	2	7
2015–16	Vancouver Canucks	NHL	41	2	6	8	26	—	—	—	—	—
2016–17	Vancouver Canucks	NHL	82	2	11	13	40	—	—	—	—	—
2017–18	Vegas Golden Knights	NHL	30	2	12	14	15	12	0	4	4	8
2018–19	New York Islanders	NHL	9	0	1	1	4	—	—	—	—	—
2019–20	Winnipeg Jets	NHL	44	2	8	10	37	—	—	—	—	—
2020–21	Nashville Predators	NHL	1	0	0	0	0	—	—	—	—	—
NHL totals			549	20	93	113	385	32	1	7	8	34

=== International ===
Year	Team	Event	Result	GP	G	A	Pts	PIM
2008	Switzerland	WJC	9th	6	0	0	0	4
2010	Switzerland	WJC	4th	3	0	0	0	0
2010	Switzerland	OG	8th	5	0	0	0	0
2011	Switzerland	WC	9th	6	0	1	1	4
2012	Switzerland	WC	11th	7	0	1	1	8
2016	Team Europe	WCH	2nd	1	0	0	0	0
Junior totals				9	0	0	0	4
Senior totals				19	0	2	2	12

Awards and achievements
Preceded by James van Riemsdyk	Philadelphia Flyers' first round draft pick 2008	Succeeded by Sean Couturier
