= Ozieri =

Ozieri Otieri (Sardinian)
- Comune
- Comune di Ozieri
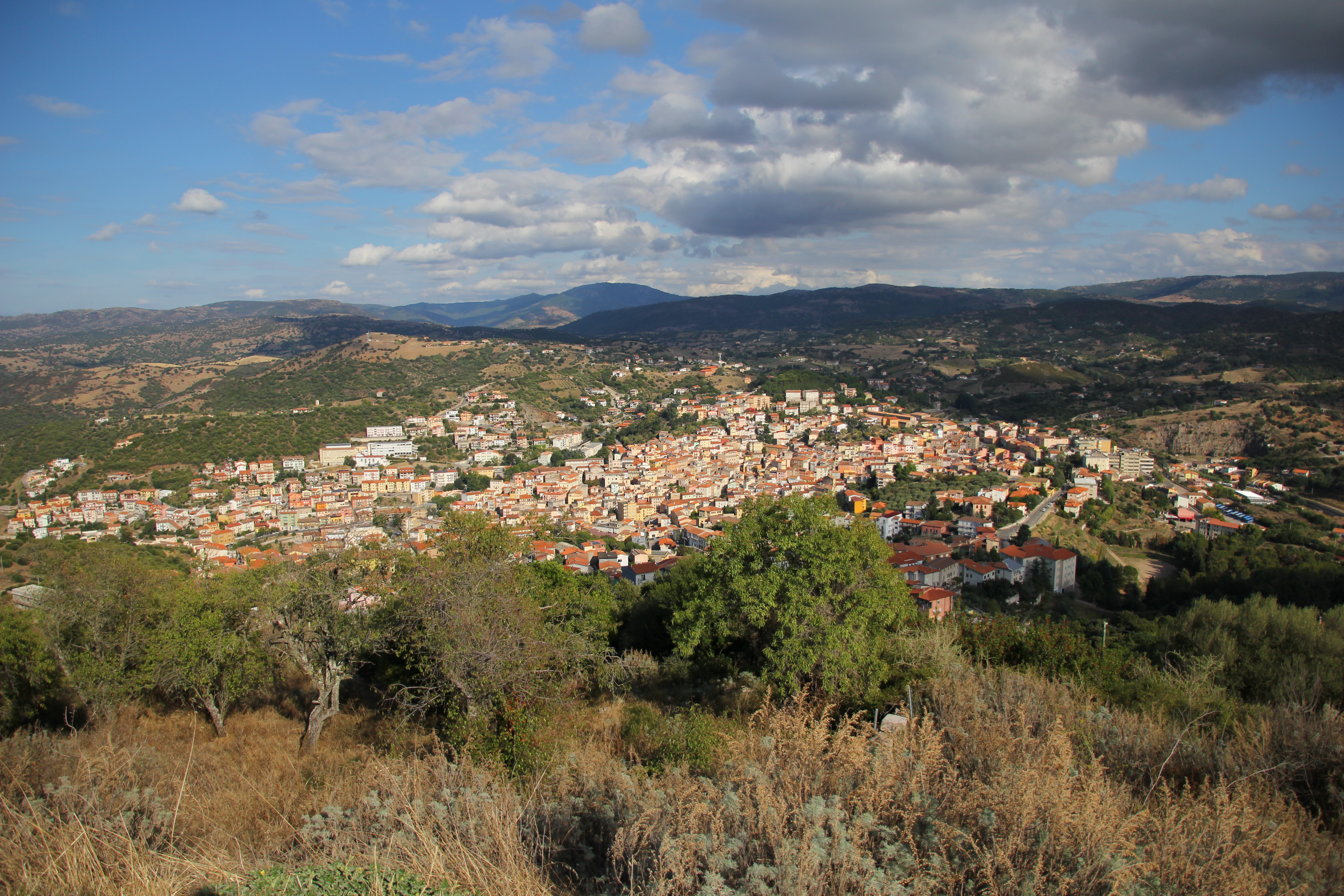
- View of Ozieri from Monserrato

- Coat of arms

- Location within Sardinia
- Coordinates: 40°35′N 9°00′E
- Country: Italy
- Region: Sardinia
- Metropolitan city: Sassari (SS)
- Frazioni: Chilivani, Fraigas, San Nicola, Vigne, Lago Del Coghinas, Regione Badde Pira

Government
  - Mayor: Marco Murgia

Area
  - Total: 252.13 km^{2} (97.35 sq mi)
- Elevation: 390 m (1,280 ft)

Population (2026)
  - Total: 9,559
  - Density: 37.91/km^{2} (98.19/sq mi)
- Demonym: Ozierese(-i)
- Time zone: UTC+1 (CET)
  - Summer (DST): UTC+2 (CEST)
- Postal code: 07014
- Dialing code: 079
- Patron saint: St. Antiochus
- Saint day: November, 13
- Website: Official website

Ozieri (Sardinian: Otieri) is a town and comune (municipality) in the Metropolitan City of Sassari in the autonomous island region of Sardinia in Italy, located in the historical region of Logudoro about 150 kilometres (93 mi) northwest of Cagliari and about 40 kilometres (25 mi) southeast of Sassari. It has 9,559 inhabitants.

Its cathedral of the Immacolata is the episcopal see of the Roman Catholic Diocese of Ozieri.

Ozieri is the centre of one the earliest known archaeological cultures on Sardinia (known as Ozieri culture).

== Demographics ==
As of 2026, the population is 9,559, of which 50.0% are males, and 50.0% are females. Minors make up 12.1% of the population, and seniors make up 28.7%.

Historical population

Year	Pop.	±%
1861	7,381	—
1871	7,996	+8.3%
1881	8,602	+7.6%
1901	9,555	+11.1%
1911	9,680	+1.3%
1921	9,536	−1.5%
1931	10,695	+12.2%
1936	9,893	−7.5%

Year	Pop.	±%
1951	11,650	+17.8%
1961	11,884	+2.0%
1971	10,988	−7.5%
1981	11,039	+0.5%
1991	11,830	+7.2%
2001	11,334	−4.2%
2011	10,881	−4.0%
2021	9,935	−8.7%

Source: ISTAT

=== Immigration ===
As of 2025, immigrants make up 3.6% of the population. The 5 largest foreign countries of birth are Romania, Germany, Pakistan, Senegal, and France.

== Main sights ==
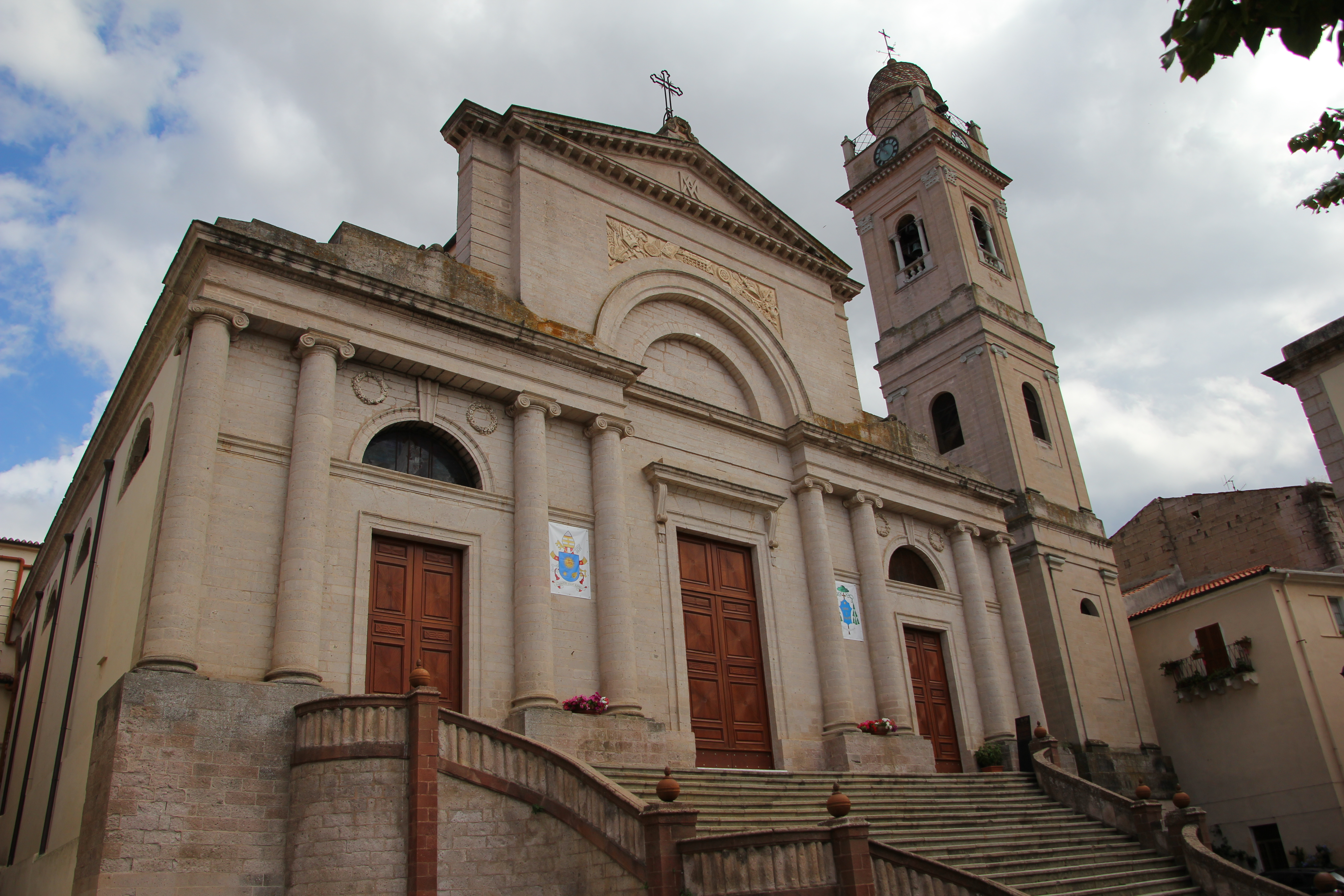
Cathedral

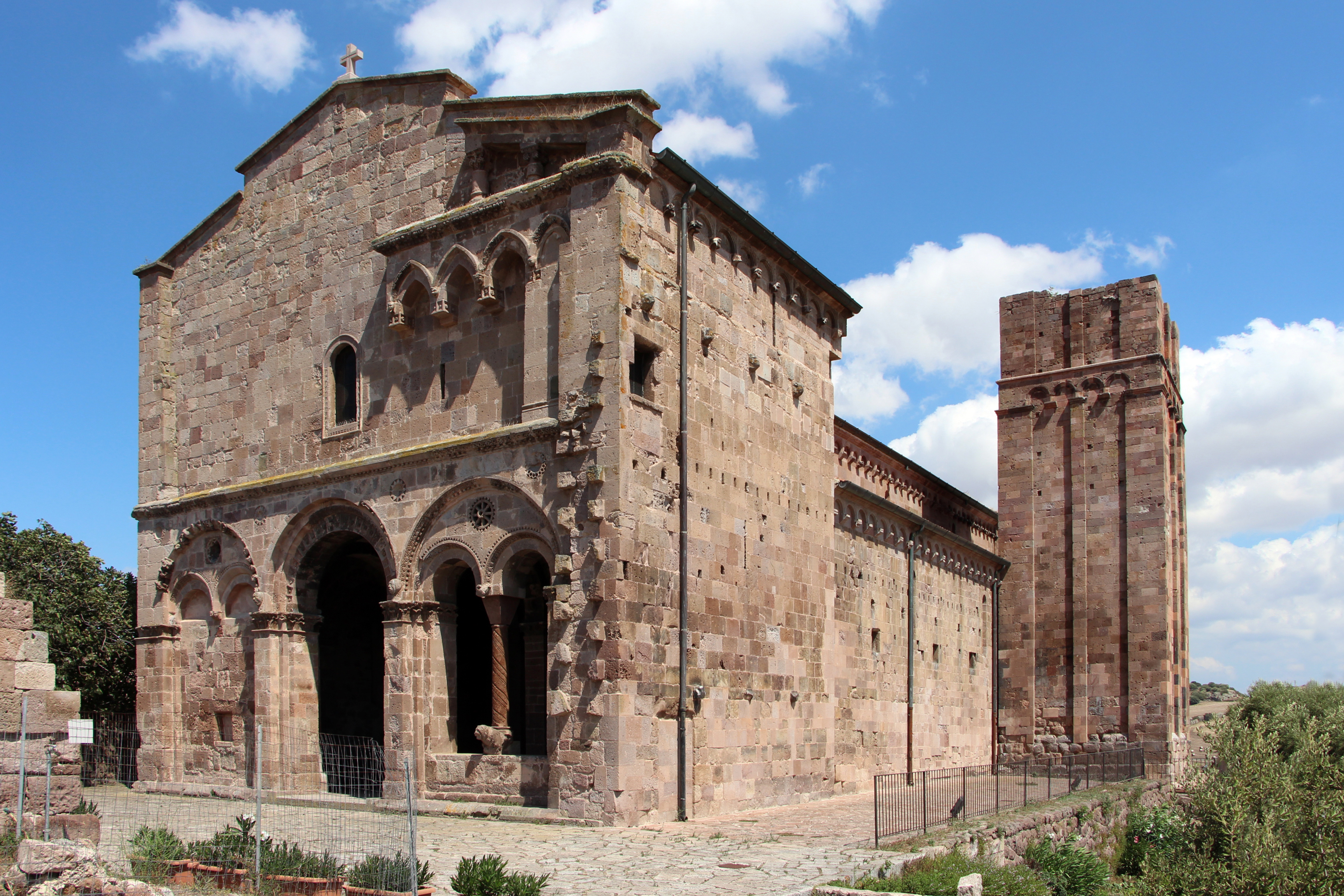
Sant'Antioco di Bisarcio

- The Cathedral of the Immacolata dates from the 15th century and was restored from 1550 to 1571. It has a nave and two aisles and houses a polyptych of the Madonna di Loreto (16th century), the work of a local master.
- Basilica of Sant'Antioco di Bisarcio, one of the largest Romanesque churches in Sardinia.
- Grotte di San Michele (3500–2700 BC) - Ozieri gives its name to the Ozieri culture, a prehistoric civilization whose first findings were excavated in the local caves of San Michele starting from 1914.
- Pont'ezzu, a Roman bridge dating to the 2nd century AD and restored in the 3rd–4th century AD. It has six arcades for a total length of 87.50 metres (287 ft)
- Civic Archaeological Museum "Alle Clarisse", one of the most important museums in Northern Sardinia, with an archaeological, numismatic, and ethnographic collection that dates from prehistoric times to the modern age.

== Transport ==
Ozieri can be reached from Sassari through the SS.597 National Road and by Olbia (SS.199).

The city has a railway station located in the frazione of Chilivani (lines to Olbia, Porto Torres and Cagliari).

== Notable people ==
- Luca Sbisa (born 1990), professional ice hockey player
- Mariangela Demurtas, musician Tristania

== Twin towns – sister cities ==
- Fiorano Modenese, Italy
- Maranello, Italy
