= Bonnanaro =

Bonnanaro Bunnànnaru (Sardinian)
- Comune
- Comune di Bonnanaro
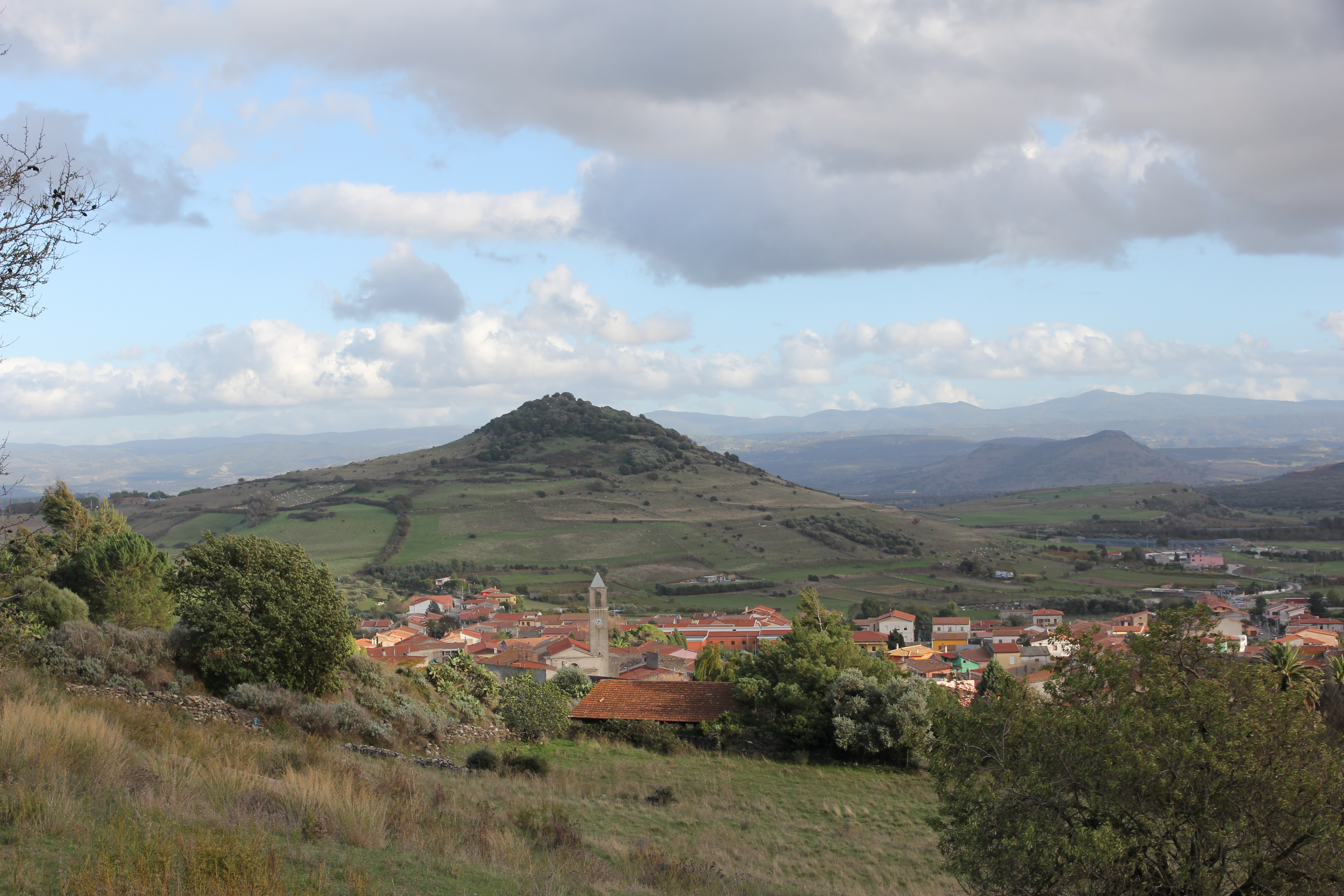
- View of Bonnanaro

- Location within Sardinia
- Coordinates: 40°32′N 8°46′E
- Country: Italy
- Region: Sardinia
- Metropolitan city: Sassari (SS)

Government
  - Mayor: Antonio Marras

Area
  - Total: 21.84 km^{2} (8.43 sq mi)
- Elevation: 405 m (1,329 ft)

Population (2026)
  - Total: 894
  - Density: 40.9/km^{2} (106/sq mi)
- Demonym: Bonnanaresi
- Time zone: UTC+1 (CET)
  - Summer (DST): UTC+2 (CEST)
- Postal code: 07043
- Dialing code: 079
- Website: Official website

Bonnanaro (Sardinian: Bunnànnaru) is a village and comune (municipality) in the Metropolitan City of Sassari in the autonomous island region of Sardinia in Italy, located about 150 kilometres (93 mi) north of Cagliari and about 30 kilometres (19 mi) southeast of Sassari. It has 894 inhabitants.

Bonnanaro borders the municipalities of Bessude, Borutta, Mores, Siligo, and Torralba.

== Demographics ==
As of 2026, the population is 894, of which 48.7% are male, and 51.3% are female. Minors make up 11.0% of the population, and seniors make up 33.7%.

Historical population

Year	Pop.	±%
1861	1,175	—
1871	1,265	+7.7%
1881	1,425	+12.6%
1901	1,800	+26.3%
1911	1,879	+4.4%
1921	1,865	−0.7%
1931	1,802	−3.4%
1936	1,858	+3.1%

Year	Pop.	±%
1951	1,866	+0.4%
1961	1,821	−2.4%
1971	1,497	−17.8%
1981	1,307	−12.7%
1991	1,198	−8.3%
2001	1,127	−5.9%
2011	1,021	−9.4%
2021	930	−8.9%

Source: ISTAT

=== Immigration ===
As of 2025, immigrants make up 3.1% of the population. The 5 largest foreign countries of birth are Romania, Argentina, Morocco, France, and Germany.

== Culture ==
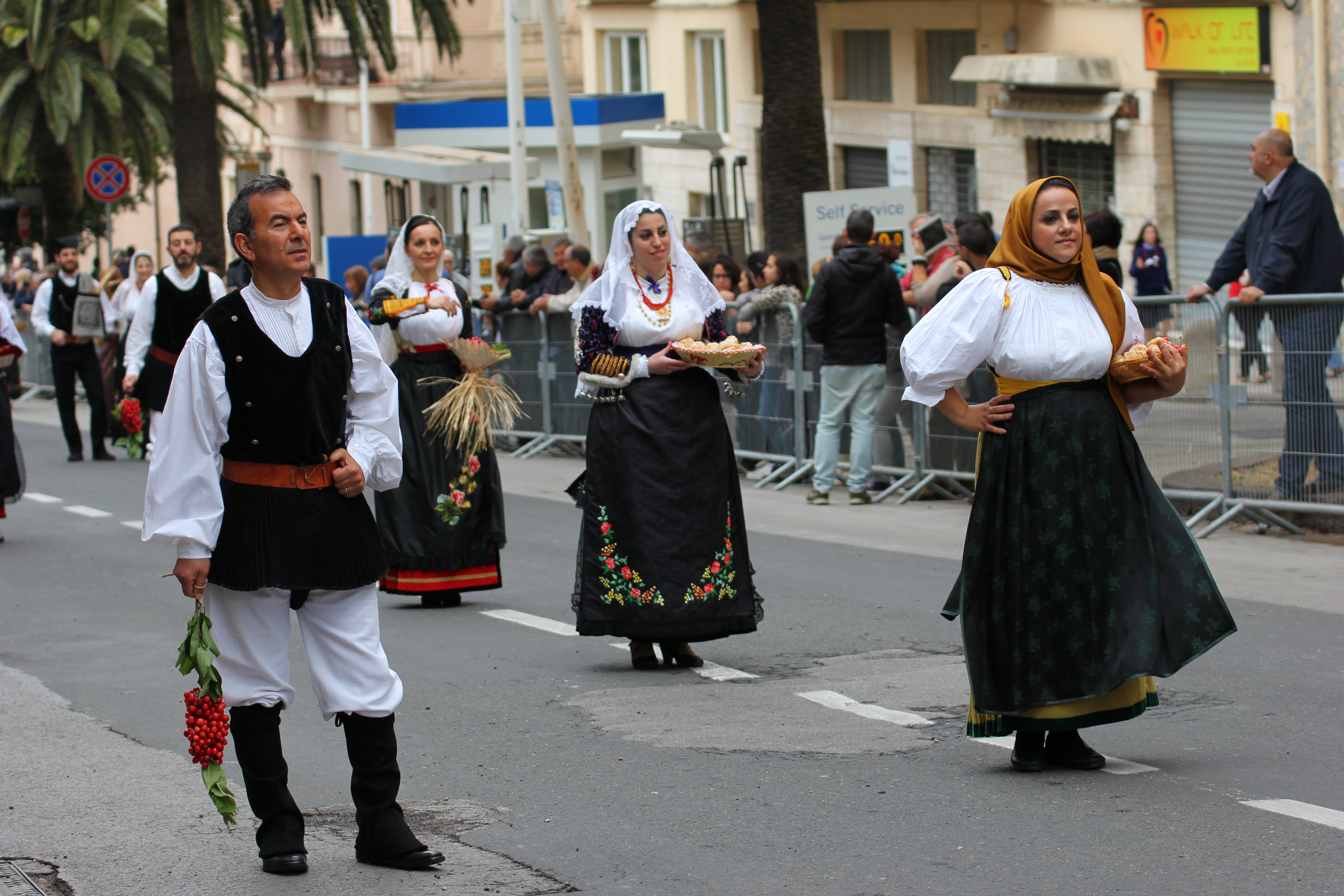
Traditional costumes of Bonnanaro

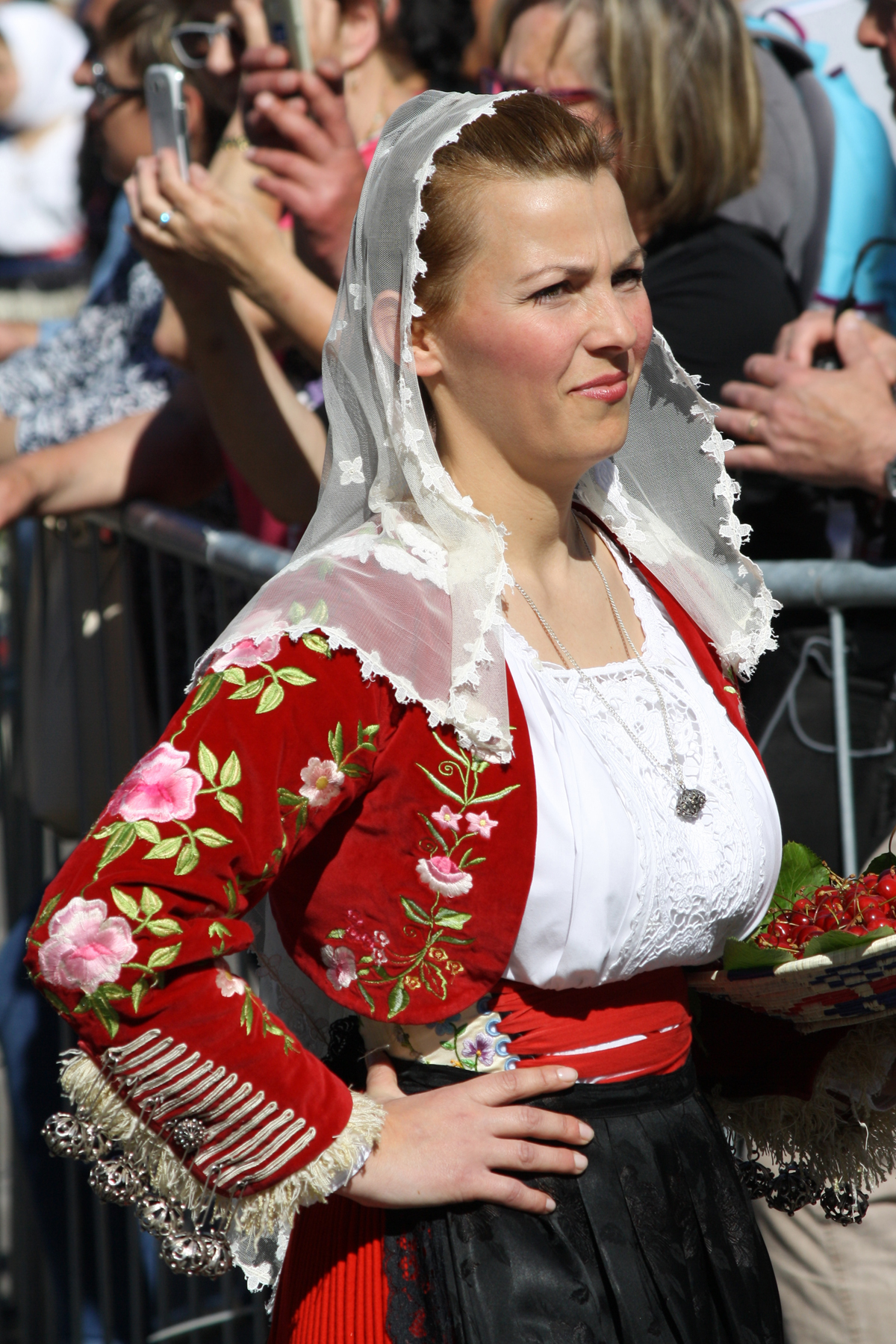
Female traditional costume of Bonnanaro

== Sights ==
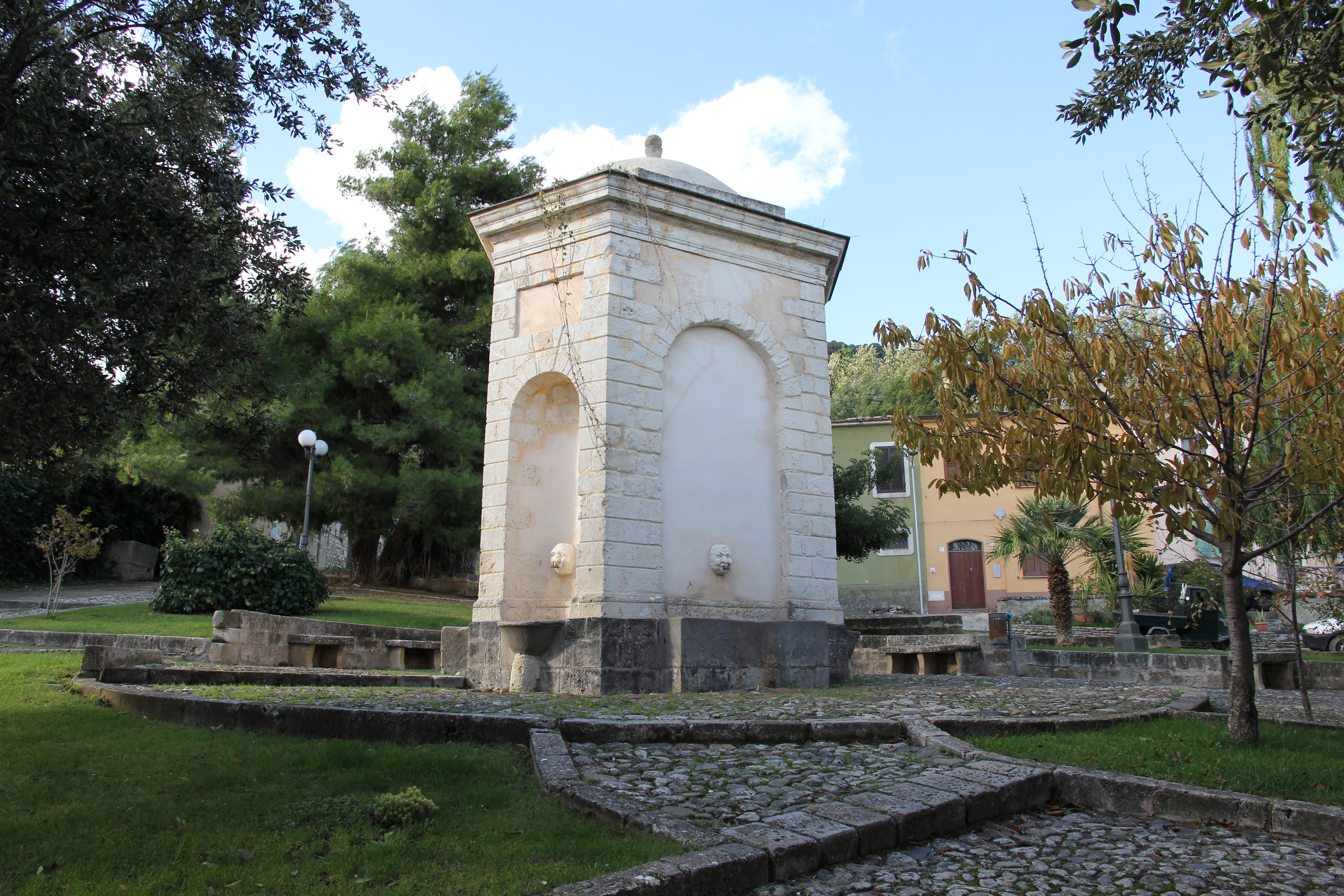
Cantaru fountain

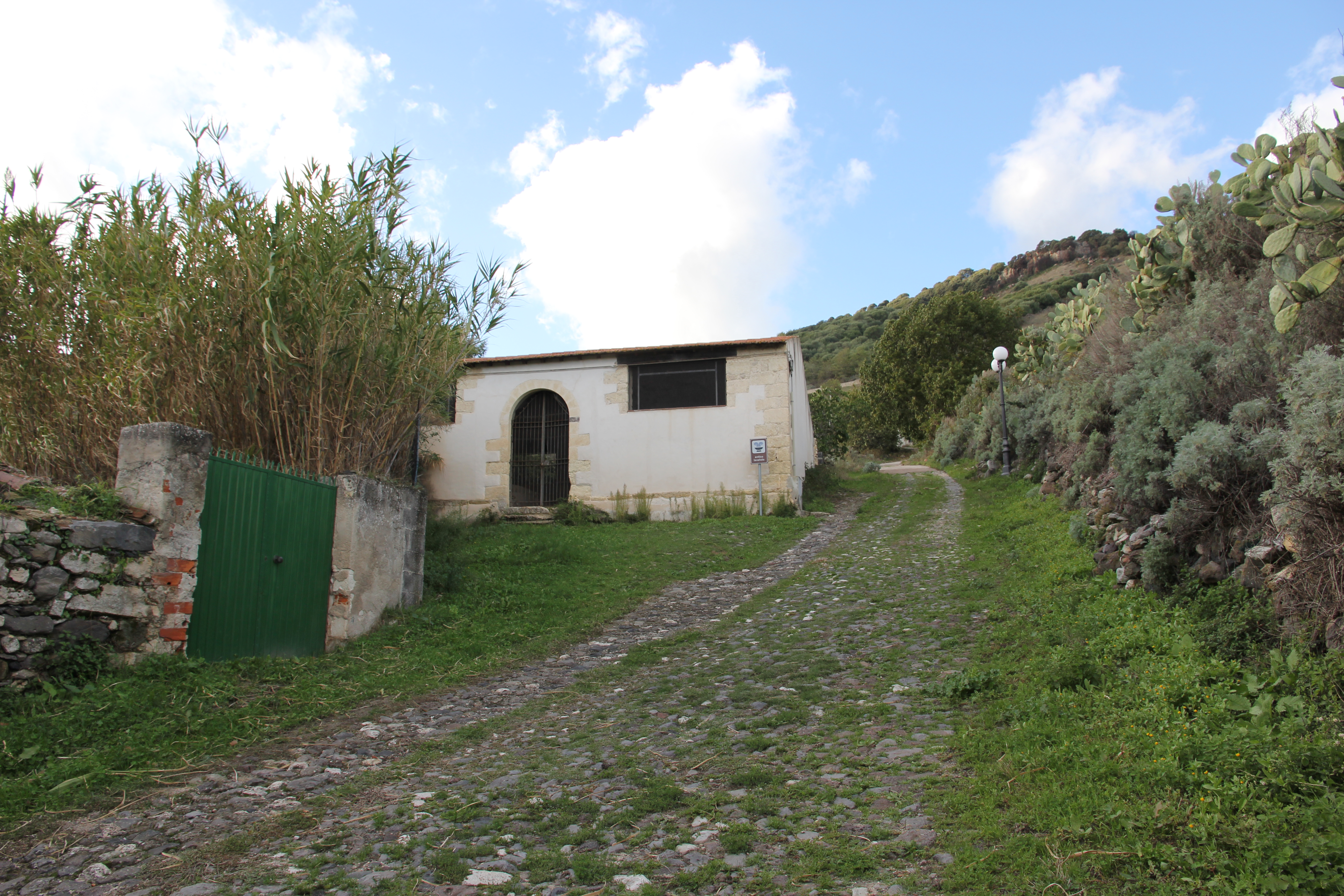
Old wash house

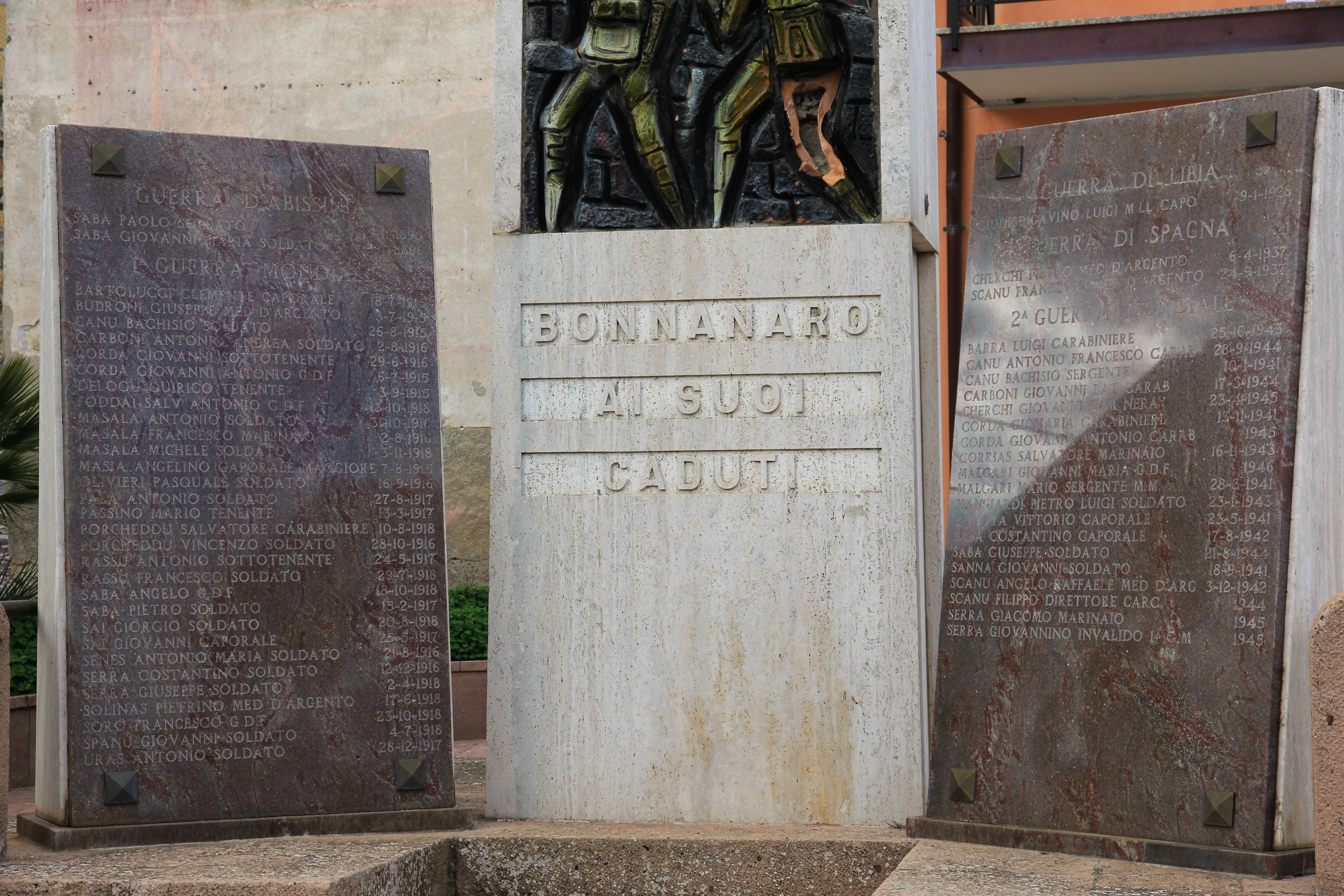
Monument to fallen soldiers

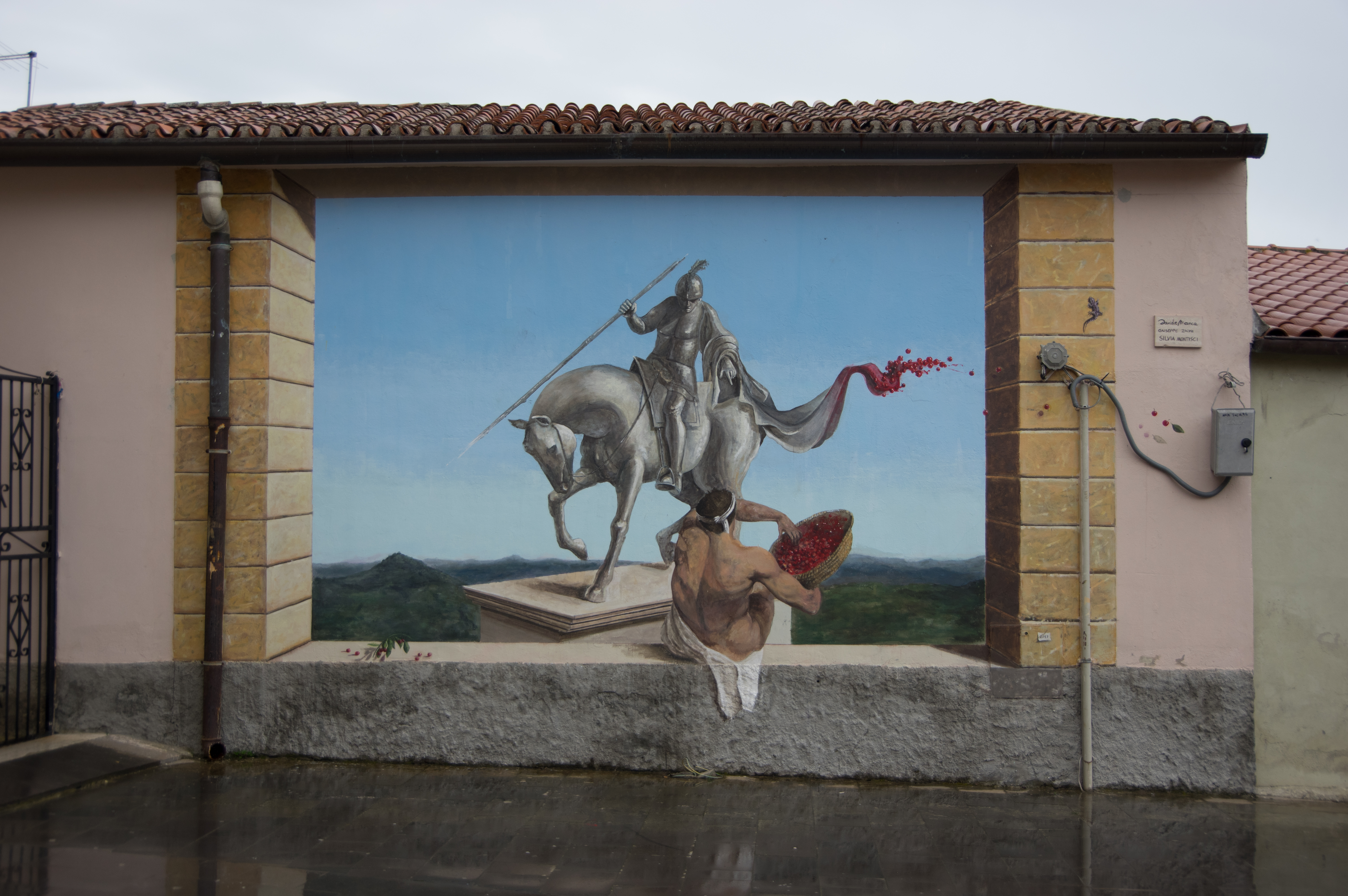
Mural
