= Logudoro =

Traditional region of Sardinia

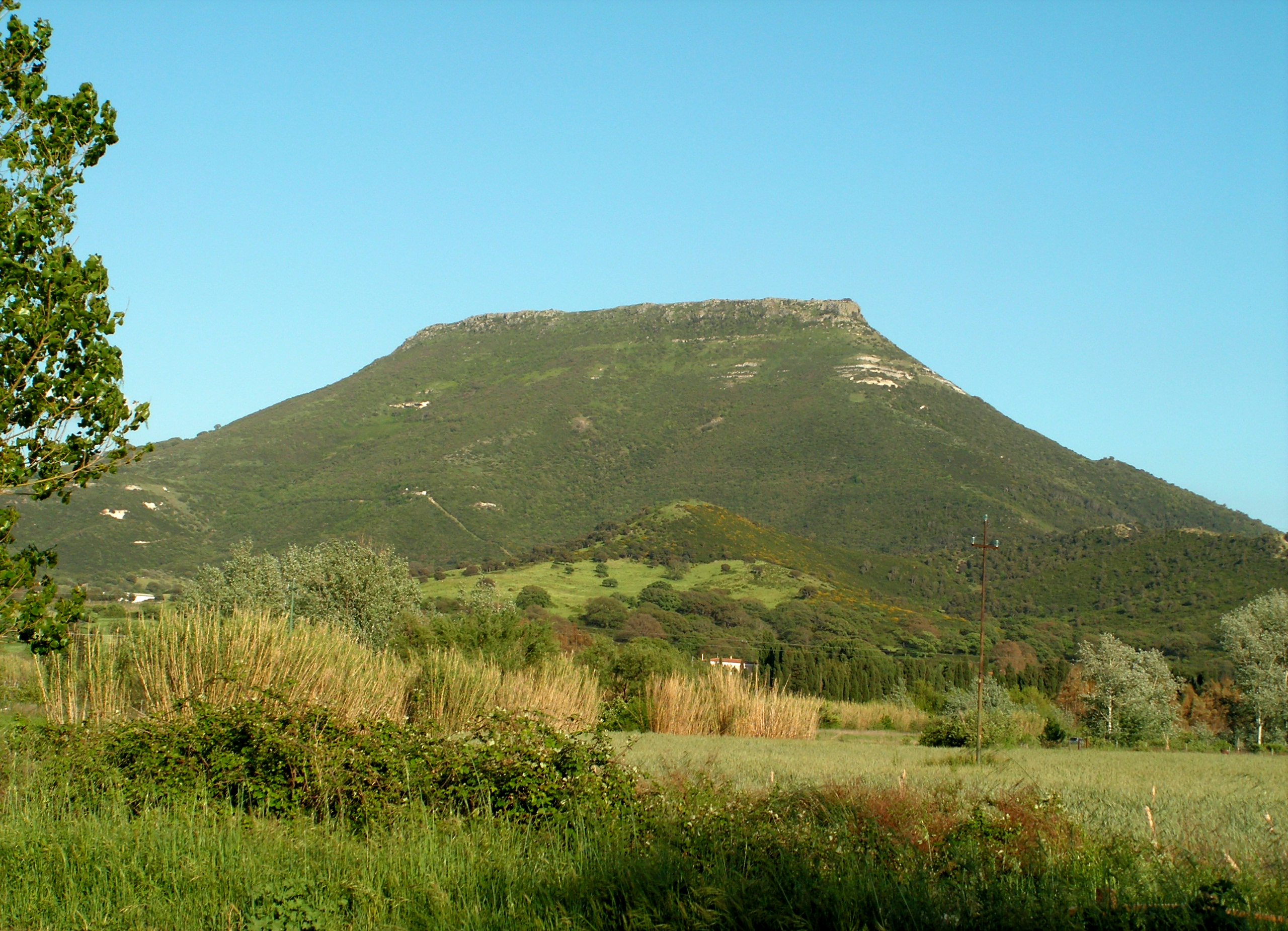
A typical landscape of Logudoro, the mesa of Monte Santo

The medieval kingdoms of Sardinia

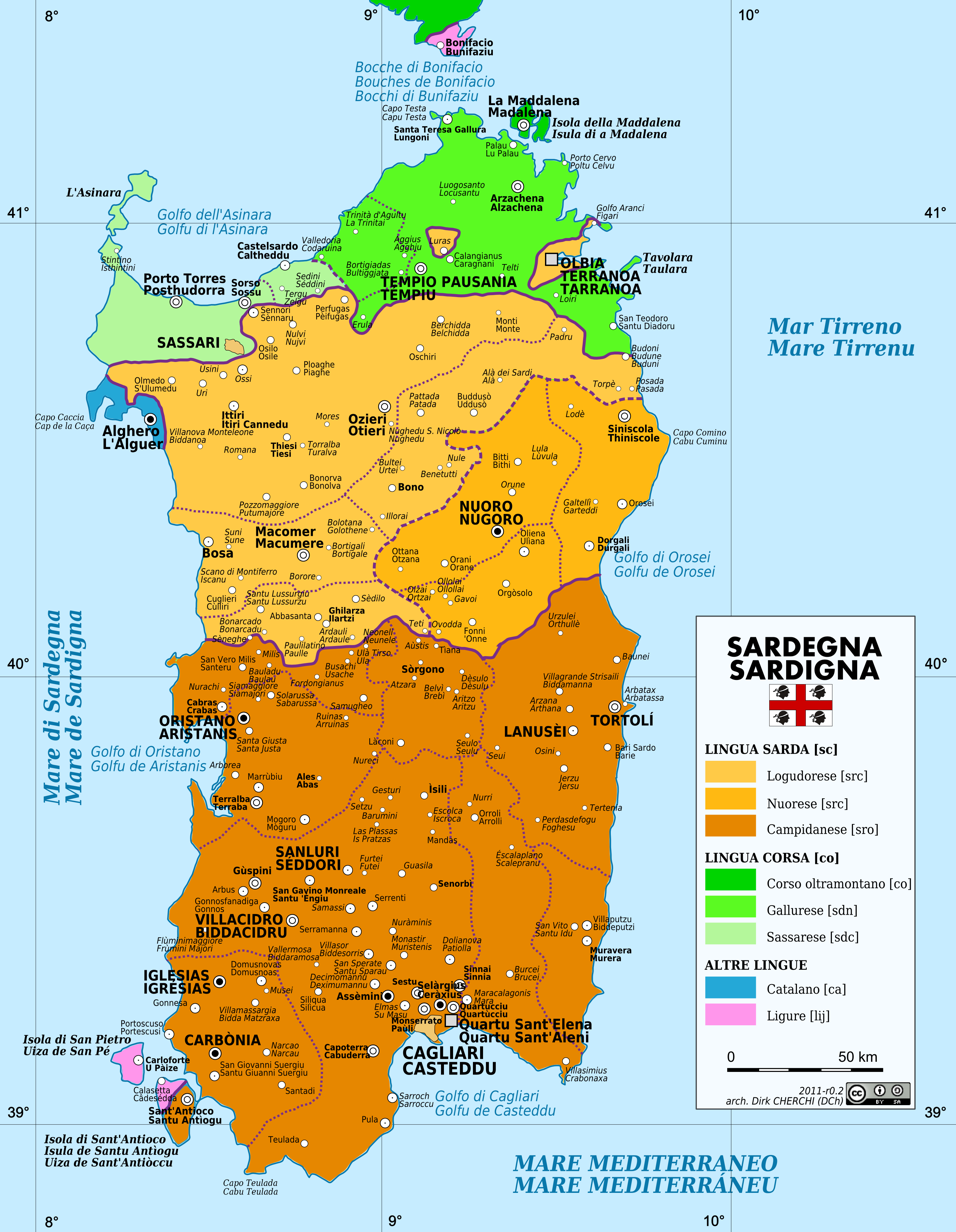
Language map of Sardinia. Logudorese and Nuorese dialects are shown in yellow

The Logudoro (pronounced [loɣuˈðɔɾɔ]; lit. 'Golden Place') is a large historical region in Sardinia, Italy. It is the namesake of the Logudorese dialect of Sardinian, which covers a large area of northern-central Sardinia.

The first denomination of the area is contained in a 1064 document on behalf of Barisone, who requested a foundation of a monastery in his Kingdom of Ore (in renno, quo dicitur ore). The current name is thought to have originated from corrupt blending of the kingdom's alternative name Logu de Torres.

In the Middle Ages it was the centre of Judicate of Logudoro, one of the four quasi-kingdoms in which Sardinia was divided. The first capital of the area was Ardara, later replaced by Sassari. From this period there are numerous countryside Romanesque basilicas. After the conquest of the giudicato by the House of Aragon, Logoduro declined, until the decision to move the seat of the governor to Cagliari made it marginal. Later, under the Savoy rule as part of the Kingdom of Sardinia, it gave shelter of bands of anti-governative brigands.

Mostly composed of soft volcanic terrains, it is the most fertile area of the island. For this reason it was settled since early Prehistoric times, as shown by the presence of numerous nuraghe. During the Roman domination it was one of the main grain suppliers of the Empire, and was the seat of several legions, which guarded it from the non-Romanized population of the inner areas.

In the early 20th century the construction of roads and railways brought more prosperity to the region, but at the same time altered what was left of its historical landscape, which had already undergone a severe degree of deforestation during the mid-19th century. The demographic pressure and the reduced competitivity of the local grain production in the Italian market pushed numerous people from Logudoro to emigrate in the 1950s, first in the main Sardinian cities and then to the Italian northern mainland.

== See also ==
- Province of Sassari
- Judicate of Logudoro
- Sardinian medieval kingdoms
- Meilogu
