= Ardara, Sardinia =

Ardara Àldara (Sardinian)
- Comune
- Comune di Ardara
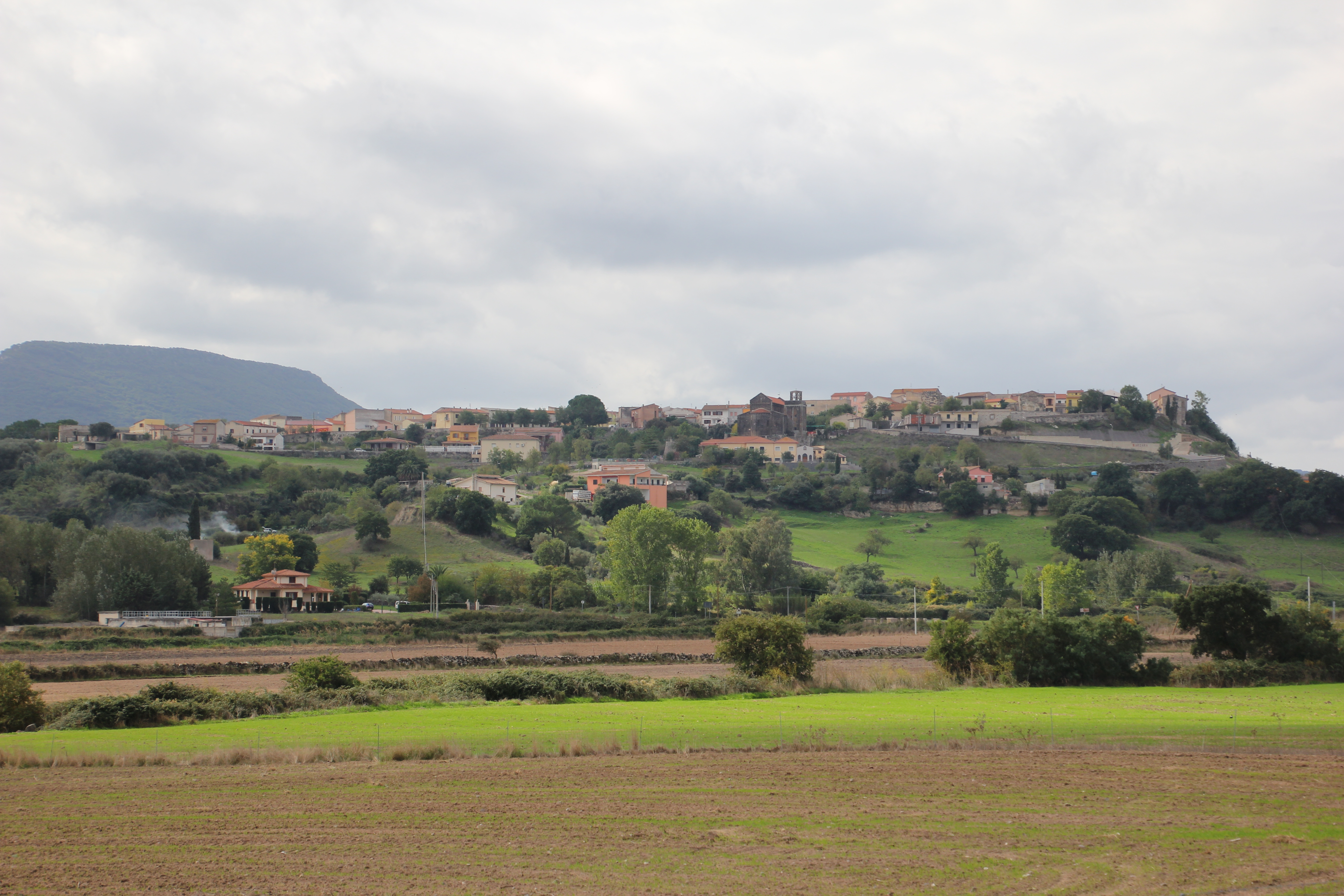
- View of Ardara

- Coat of arms

- Location of Ardara in Sardinia
- Coordinates: 40°37′22″N 8°48′41″E
- Country: Italy
- Region: Sardinia
- Metropolitan city: Sassari

Government
  - Mayor: Francesco Dui

Area
  - Total: 38.19 km^{2} (14.75 sq mi)
- Elevation: 296 m (971 ft)

Population (2026)
  - Total: 680
  - Density: 18/km^{2} (46/sq mi)
- Demonym: Ardaresi
- Time zone: UTC+1 (CET)
  - Summer (DST): UTC+2 (CEST)
- Postal code: 07010
- Dialing code: 079
- Website: Official website

Ardara (Sardinian: Àldara) is a village and comune (municipality) in the Metropolitan City of Sassari in the autonomous island region of Sardinia in Italy, located about 160 kilometres (99 mi) north of Cagliari and about 25 kilometres (16 mi) southeast of Sassari. It has 680 inhabitants.

It was one of the capitals of Judicate di Torres. The village houses the ruins of the Castle of the Giudicato of Torres (11th century), the medieval walls, and the Romanesque Basilica of Santa Maria del Regno.

Ardara borders the municipalities of Chiaramonti, Mores, Ozieri, Ploaghe, and Siligo.

== Demographics ==
As of 2026, the population is 680, of which 50.6% are male, and 49.4% are female. Minors make up 12.9% of the population, and seniors make up 25.4%.

Historical population

Year	Pop.	±%
1861	313	—
1871	386	+23.3%
1881	504	+30.6%
1901	537	+6.5%
1911	572	+6.5%
1921	579	+1.2%
1931	695	+20.0%
1936	783	+12.7%

Year	Pop.	±%
1951	1,063	+35.8%
1961	1,036	−2.5%
1971	780	−24.7%
1981	717	−8.1%
1991	839	+17.0%
2001	847	+1.0%
2011	800	−5.5%
2021	736	−8.0%

Source: ISTAT

=== Immigration ===
As of 2025, immigrants make up 4.0% of the population. The 5 largest foreign countries of birth are Romania, Switzerland, France, Germany, and Hungary.

== Sights ==
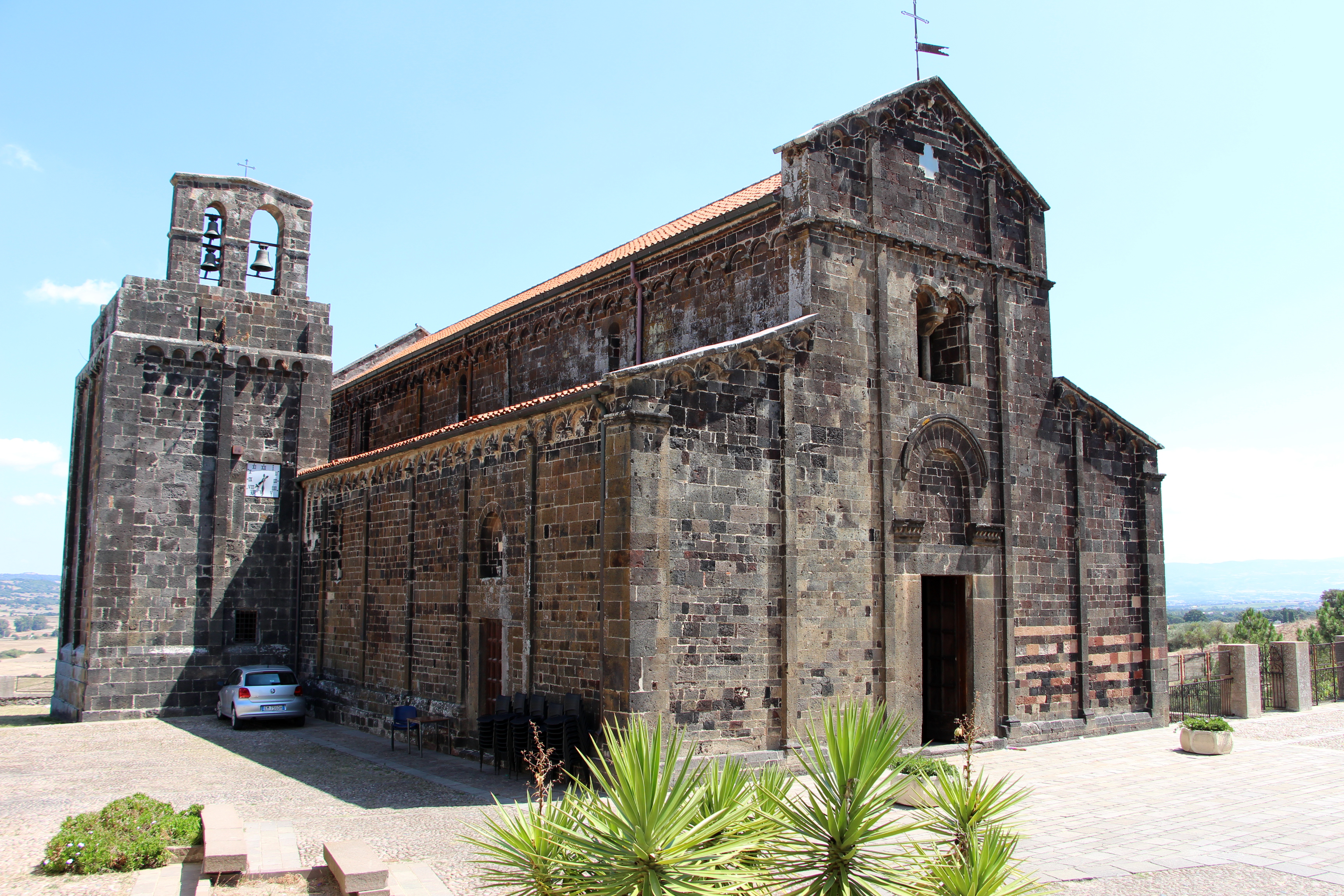
Church of Santa Maria del Regno

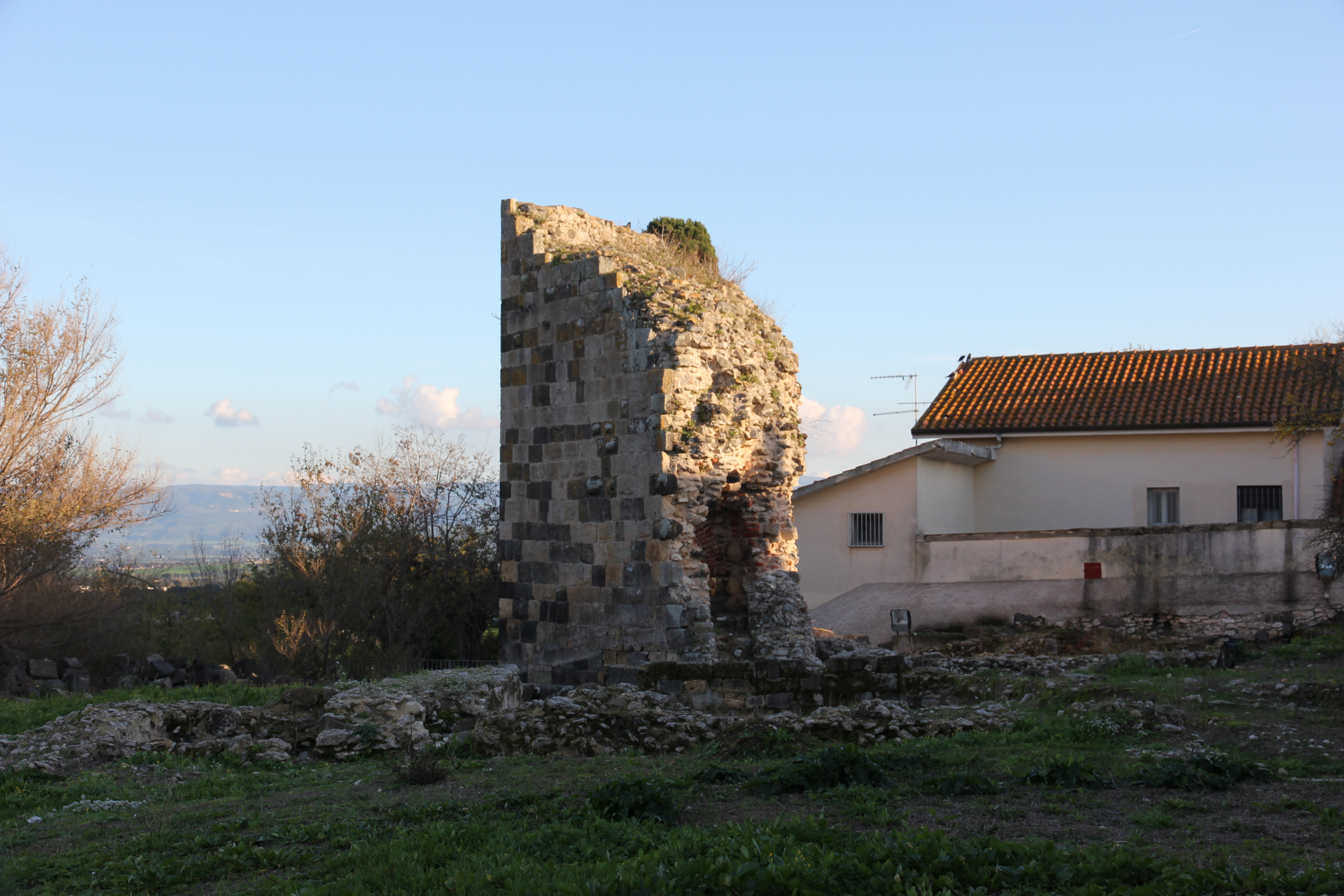
Ruins of the judicial castle

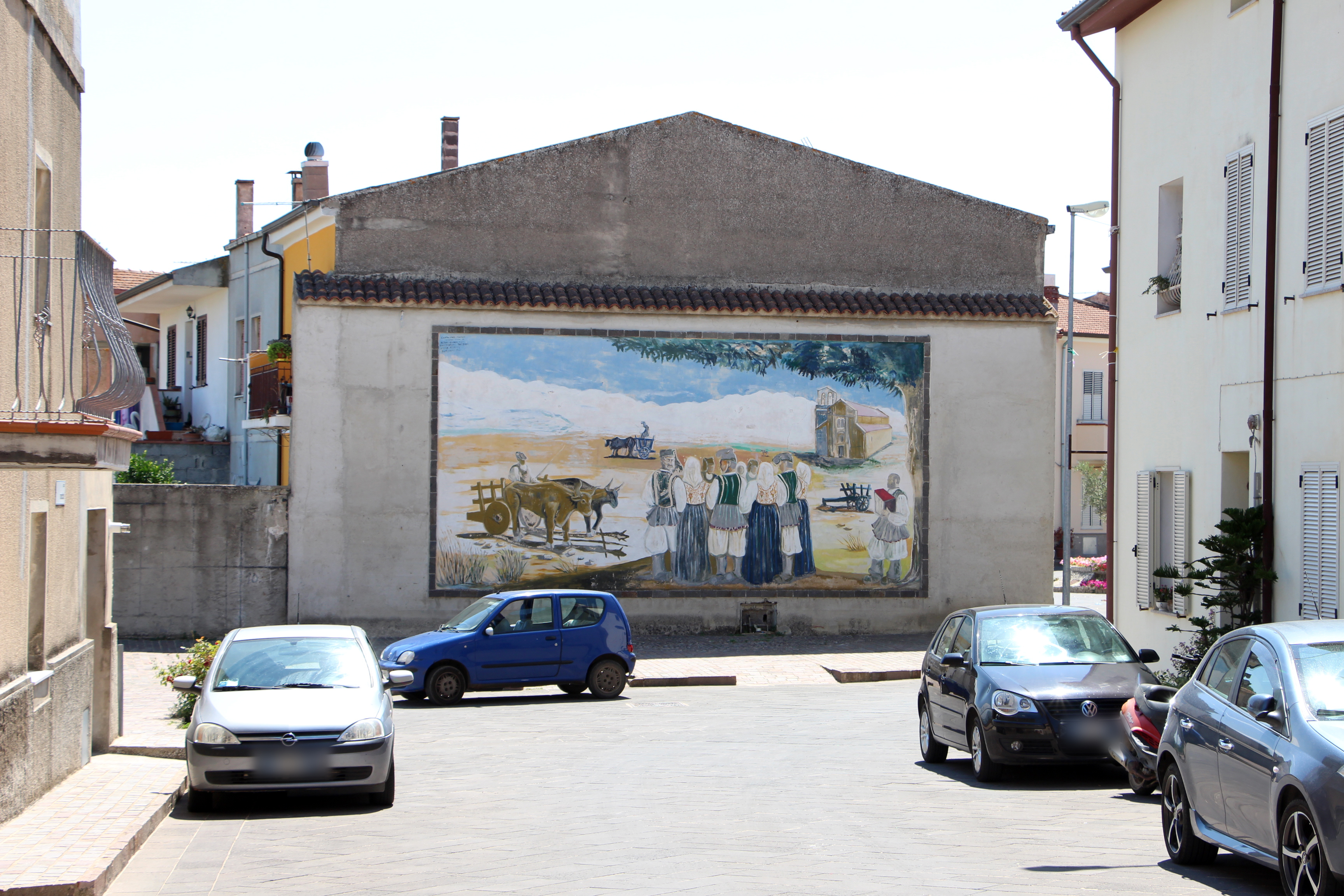
Mural

== Notable people ==
Ardara is the birthplace of the singer Roberto Meloni, who represented Latvia at the 2007 and 2008 Eurovision Song Contest with Bonaparti.lv and Pirates of the Sea bands.
