= Romanesque architecture in Sardinia =

Architectural style

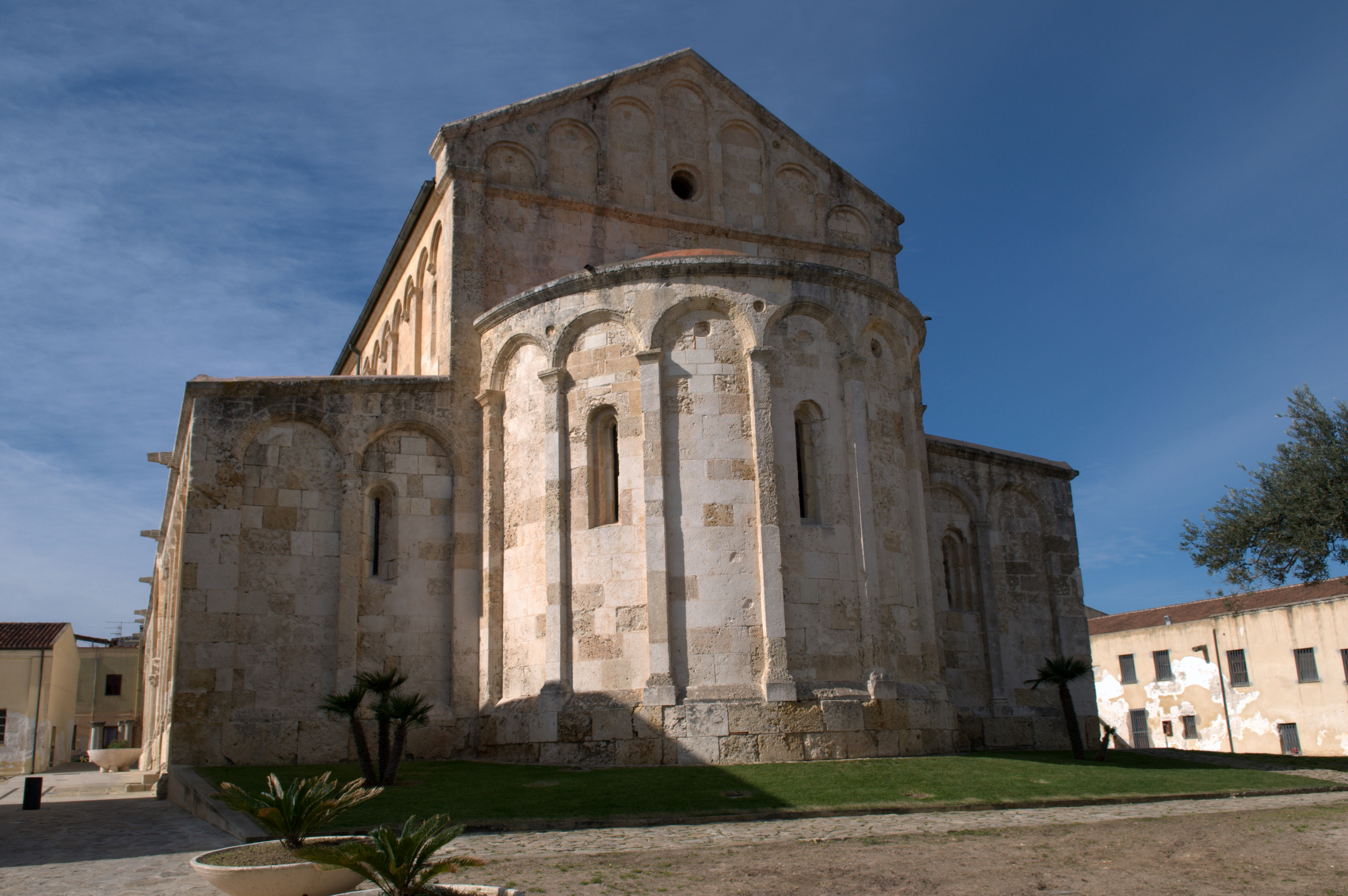
Basilica of San Gavino, Porto Torres

The Sardinian Romanesque is the Romanesque architectural style that developed in Sardinia. The Romanesque architecture in Sardinia has had a remarkable development since the early origins, during the Giudicati era, and for a long period. His expressions, although autonomous, are not classifiable in a recognizable image, since in the island the Romanesque manifested itself with unusual results but in numerous forms; this is due to the establishment in Sardinia of several religious orders, coming from various Italian regions and from France. Consequently, in the architectures of that era Pisan, Lombard and Provençal influences are recognizable as well as traces of the passage of workers, coming from the Iberian Peninsula, of Islamic culture. In total there are over 150 Romanesque monuments in Sardinia.

== History ==
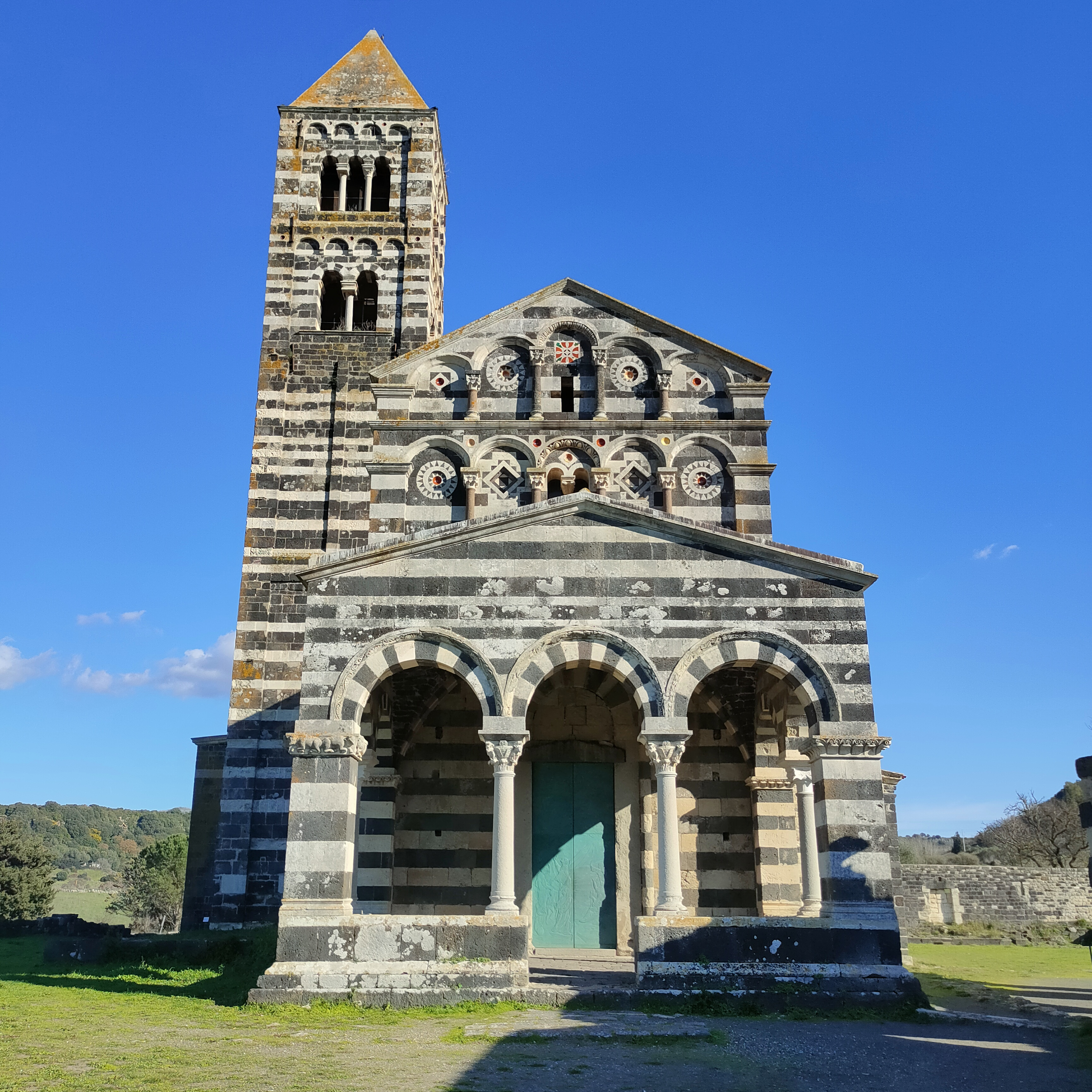
Facade of the basilica of Saccargia, Codrongianos

The first Romanesque building on the island is the Basilica of San Gavino in Porto Torres, Giudicato of Torres, which was started under the reign of the Judike Gonario I of Torres Lacon-Gunale (circa 1015–1038). The new basilica was erected near an area where there was an early Christian necropolis and two ancient basilicas datable to the 5th-7th century, the Judike hired workers in Pisa to build it. On the death of Gonnario he was succeeded by his son Barisone I of Torres who continued the construction of the basilica, which was completed before 1063. At the same time Barisone I opened the season of immigration of monastic orders on the island, in fact in 1063 he asked Desiderio di Benevento, abbot of Montecassino, to send a group of monks to take possession of a large area and its appurtenances: including the churches of Santa Maria di Bubalis (identified with Nostra Segnora de Mesumundu) and the church of saints Elia and Enoc, located on top of Mount Santu in the territory of Siligo. In 1089 Constantine I of Cagliari Judike of Cagliari, donated to the abbot of Abbey of Saint-Victor de Marseille, Richard, the Basilica of San Saturnino and other properties for the monks to found a monastery. From then on, for several decades many religious orders arrived on the island, including the Camaldolese, the Vallombrosians, the Cistercians, the Victorians, etc. Following this phenomenon, through the considerable financial commitment of the local nobility (mayorales), numerous private churches were founded, so the development of Romanesque architecture took place which, on the island, took on original and very interesting features.

== Architecture ==
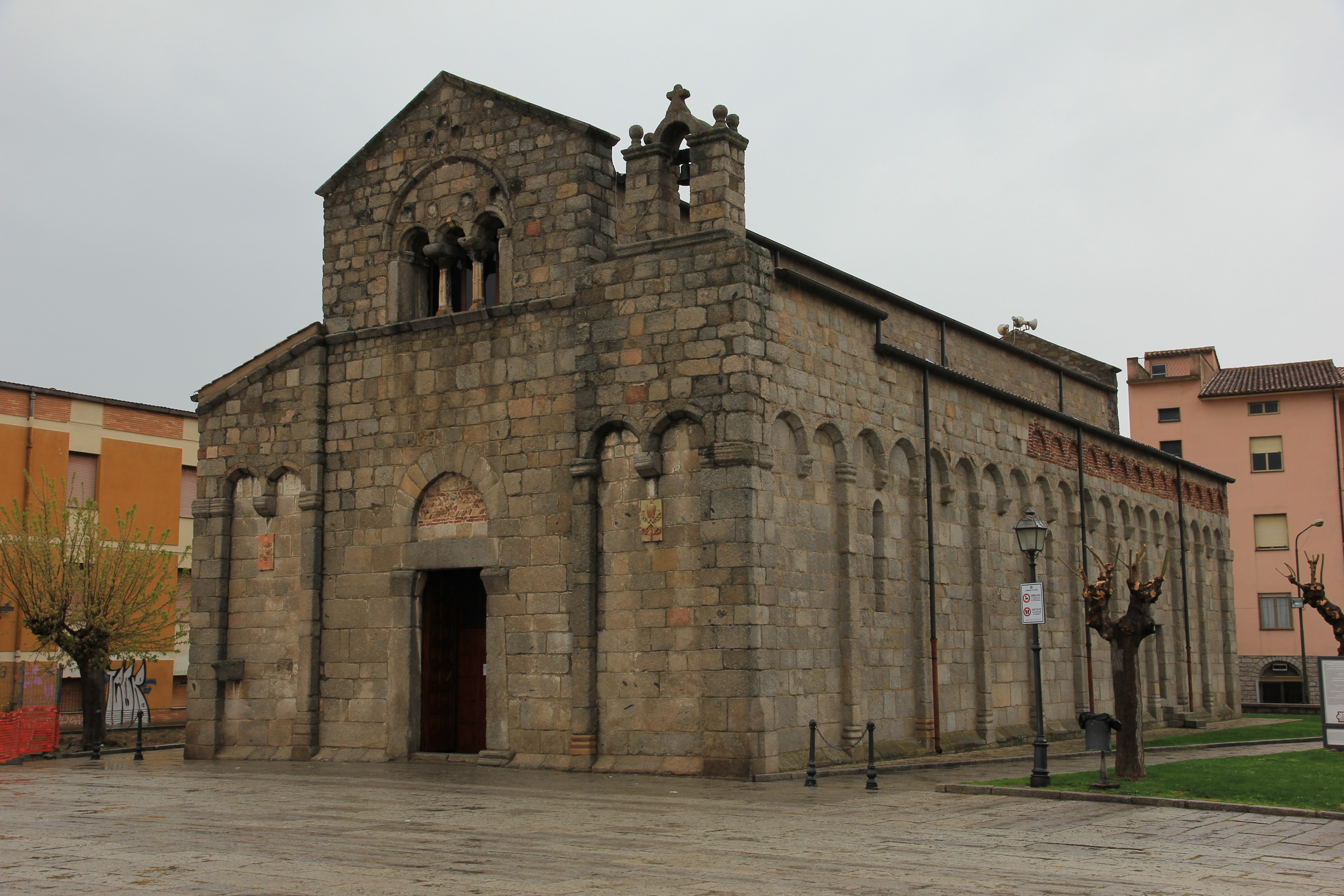
Basilica of San Simplicio, Olbia

Giulio Carlo Argan identifies in the Sardinian Romanesque of the 11th and 12th centuries a "particular attitude" to the two new Lombard and Tuscan currents, which are often merged producing unprecedented results. As in the case of San Nicola di Trullas (before 1113) in Semestene (SS), the palatine chapel of Santa Maria del Regno (1107) in Ardara or the San Nicola di Silanis (before 1122) of Sedini (SS) and the Basilica of San Simplicio in Olbia (11th-12th century) just to name a few. There is no shortage of examples of exclusively Lombard architecture, as in the case of the Church of San Pietro di Zuri by master Anselmo da Como.

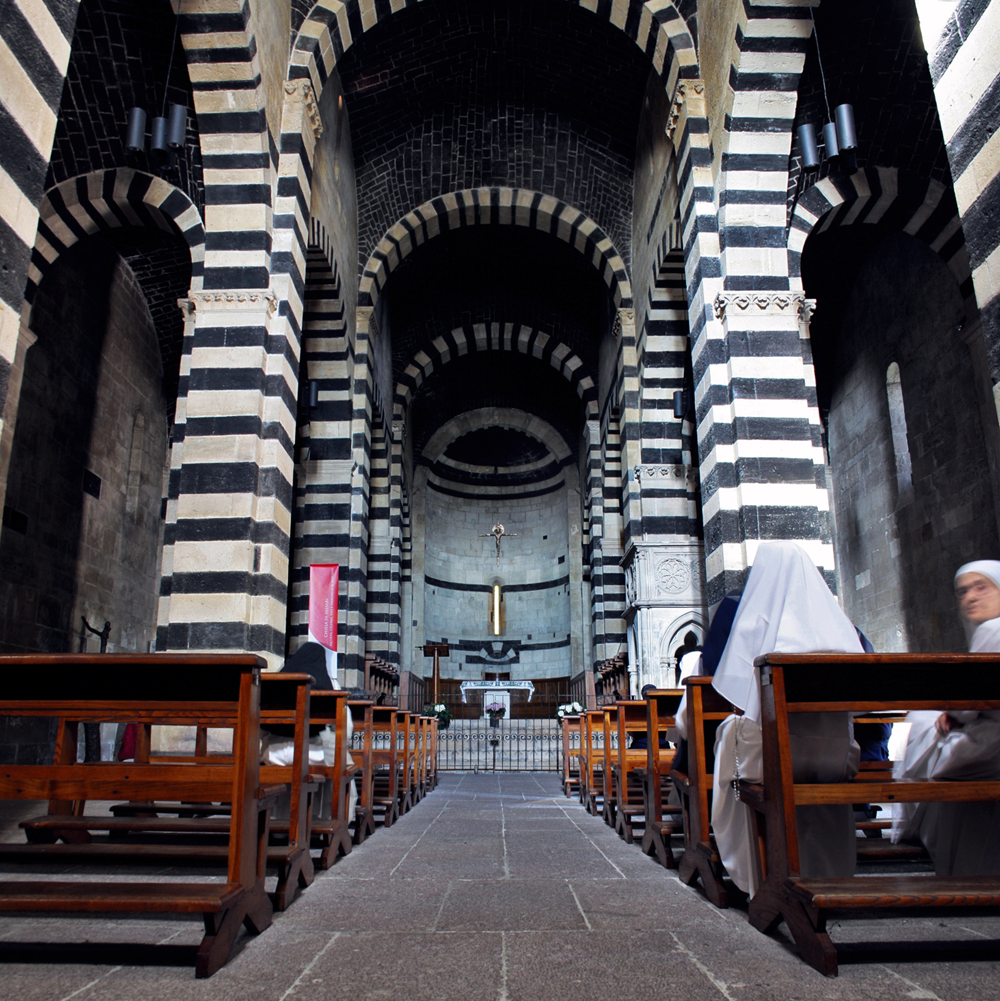
Central nave of San Pietro di Sorres, Borutta

There are also numerous French-derived architectures built on behalf of the Marseille monks by Provençal workers, in some cases assisted by local workers trained in Italy. These include the church of San Platano in Villaspeciosa, the church of San Gemiliano in Sestu, San Lorenzo in Cagliari, San Saturnino di Ussana and the first plant of Santa Maria di Uta (CA). But not only the Benedictines of San Vittore acted on the island, but also other orders from beyond the Alps such as the Cistercians, the Templars and the Lerinenses.

Among the Romanesque architecture of Sardinia numerous examples of churches of narrow Tuscan origin can highlighted, such as the Basilica di Saccargia in Codrongianos and the Cathedral of San Pietro di Sorres, Borutta (SS), the Church of Nostra Signora di Tergu or the Cathedral of Santa Giusta of the homonymous center (OR) and the church of San Nicola di Ottana (NU).

Remarkable are also the defensive structures such as the numerous castles and towers of the city of Cagliari, including the Tower of San Pancrazio and the Tower of the Elephant, designed by the Sardinian architect Giovanni Capula.

== Image gallery ==
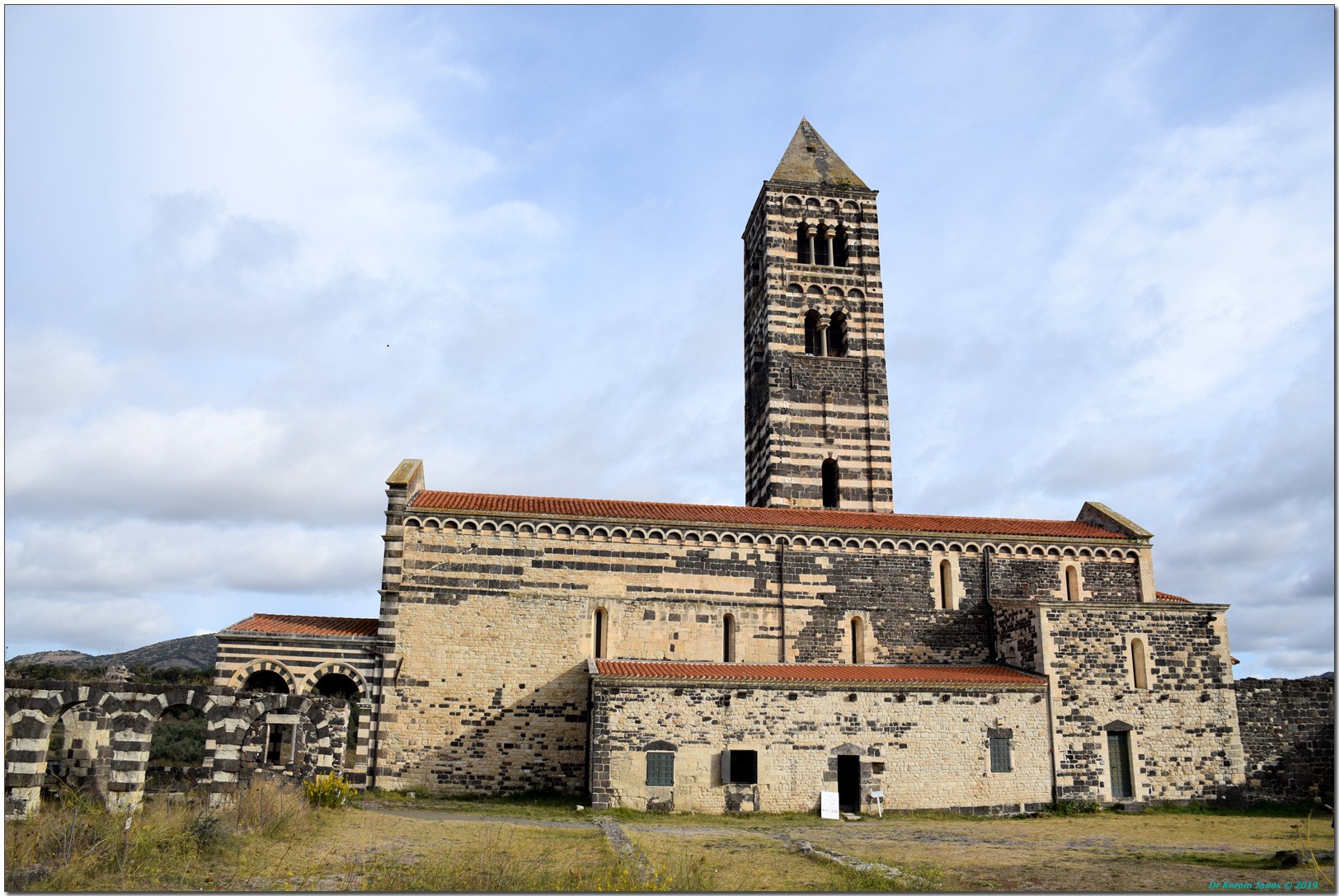
Saccargia, lateral view

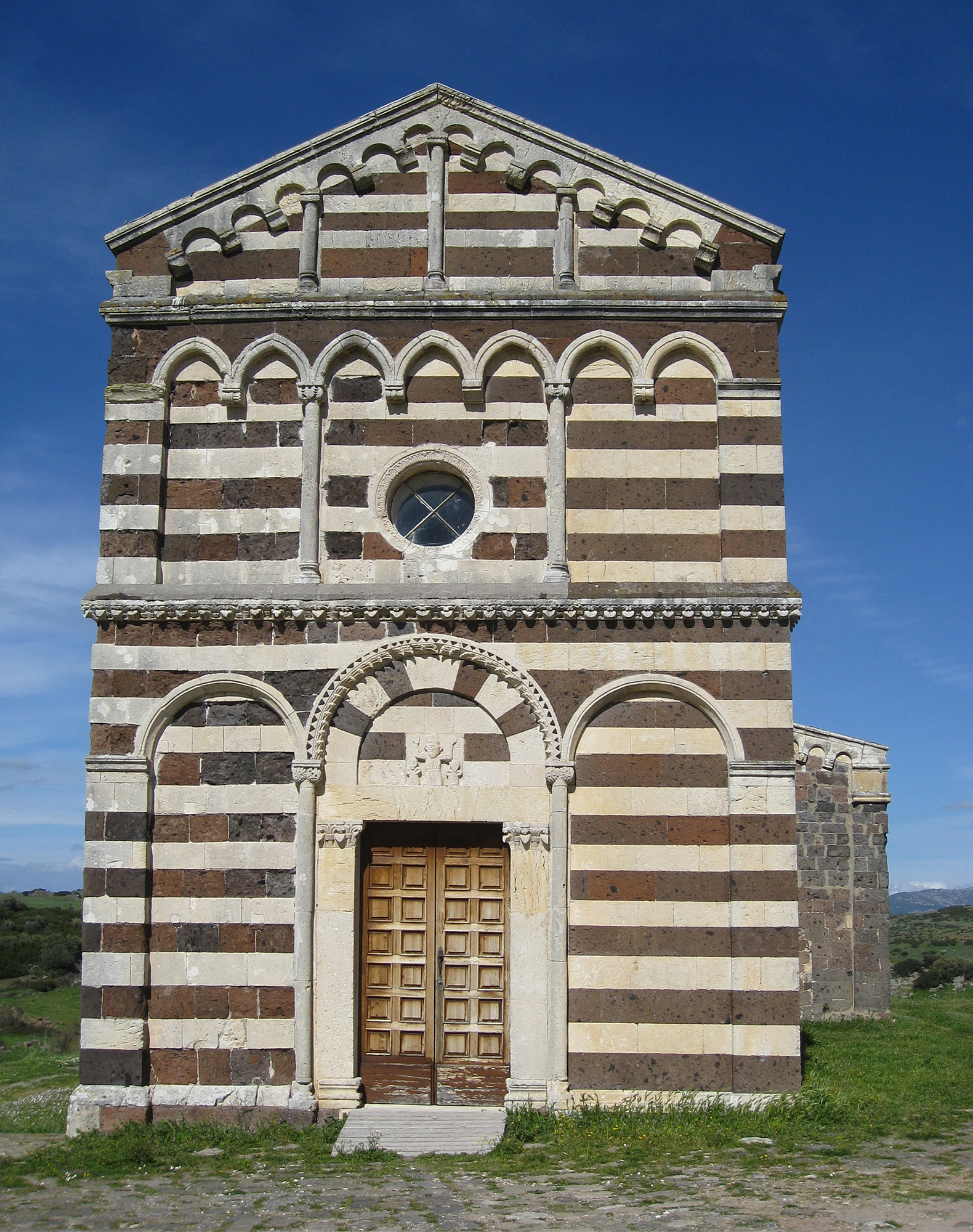
Church of San Pietro delle Immagini or del Crocifisso, Bulzi

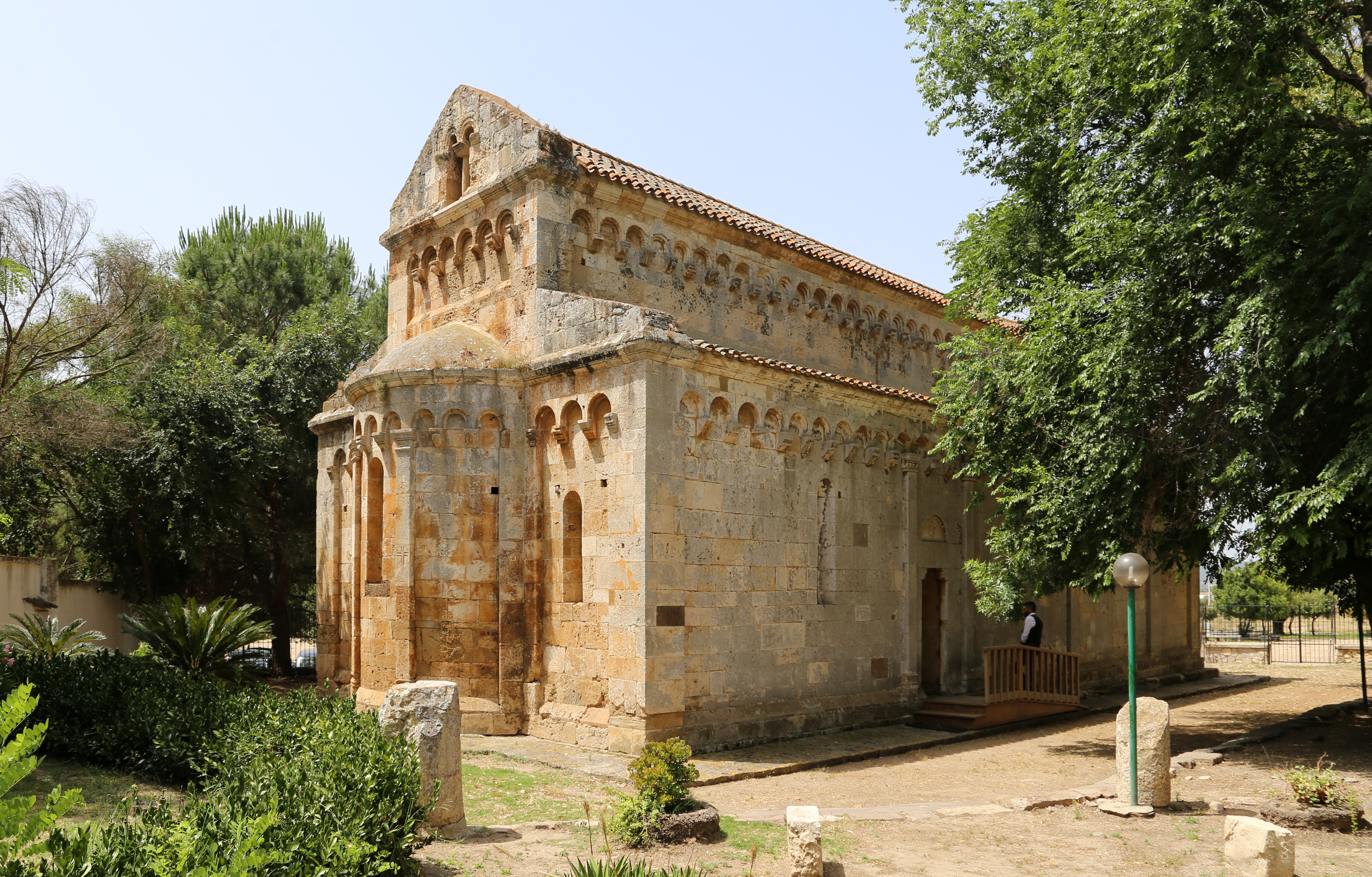
Church of Santa Maria, Uta

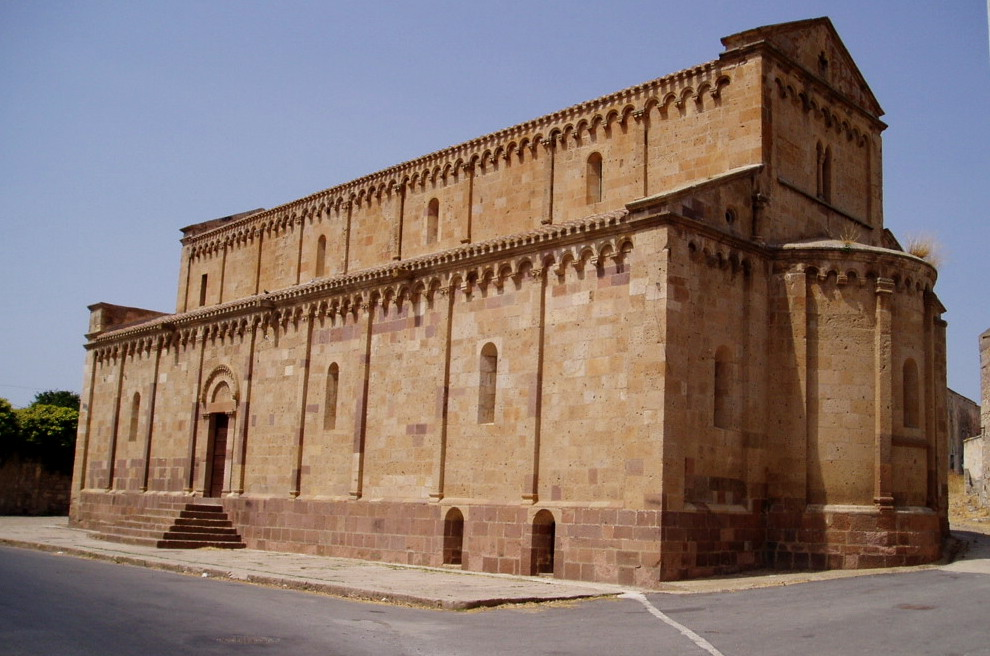
Cathedral of Santa Maria di Monserrato, Tratalias

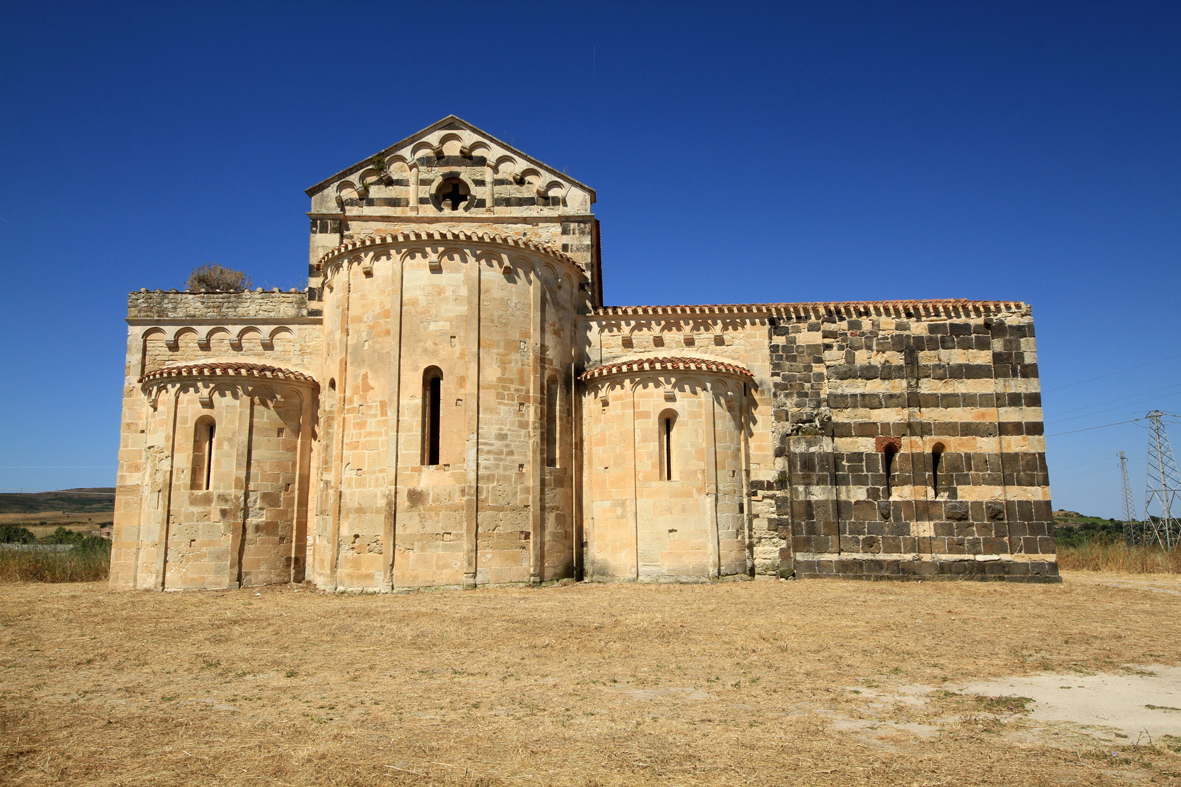
Church of San Michele di Salvènero, Ploaghe

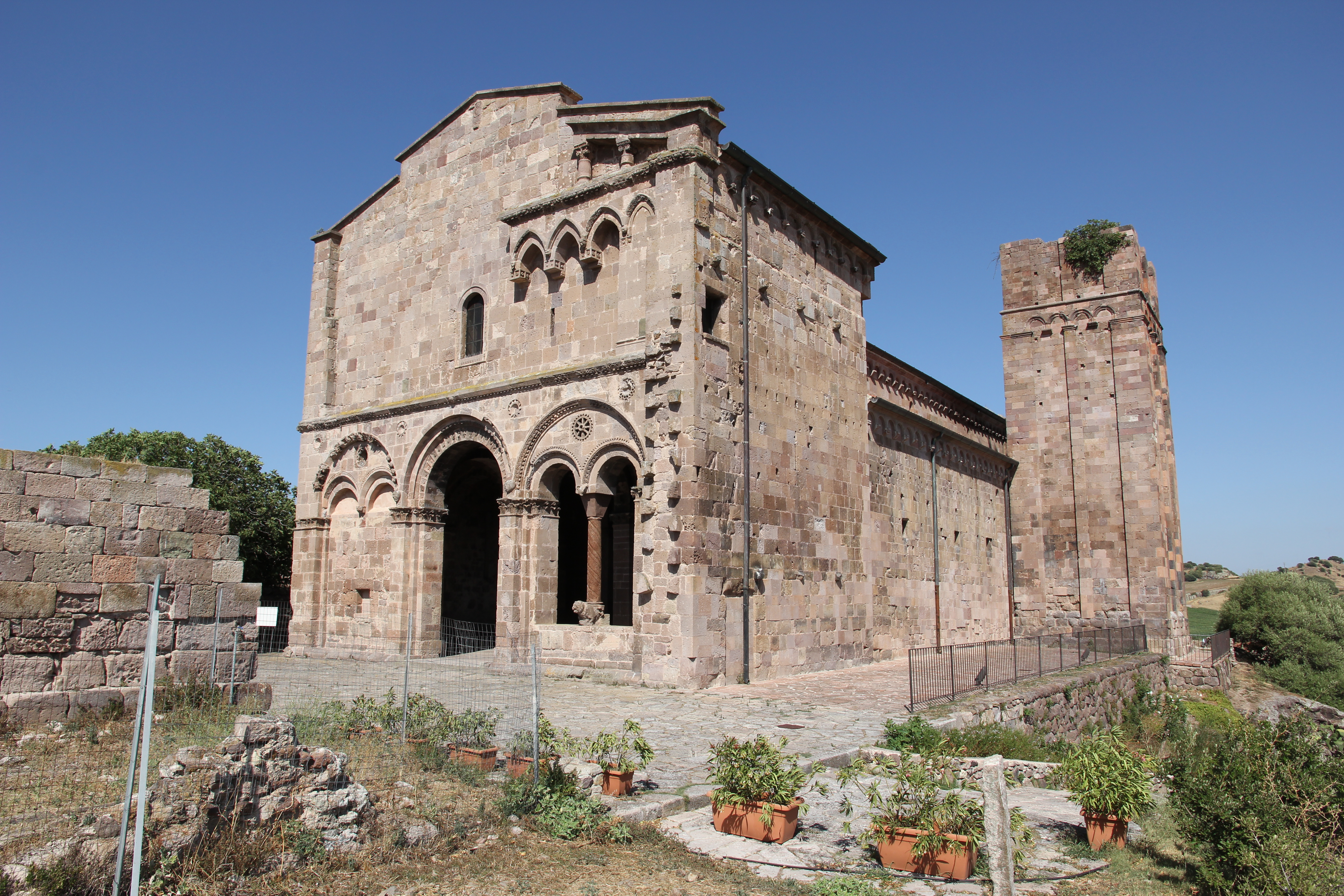
Cathedral of Sant'Antioco di Bisarcio, Ozieri

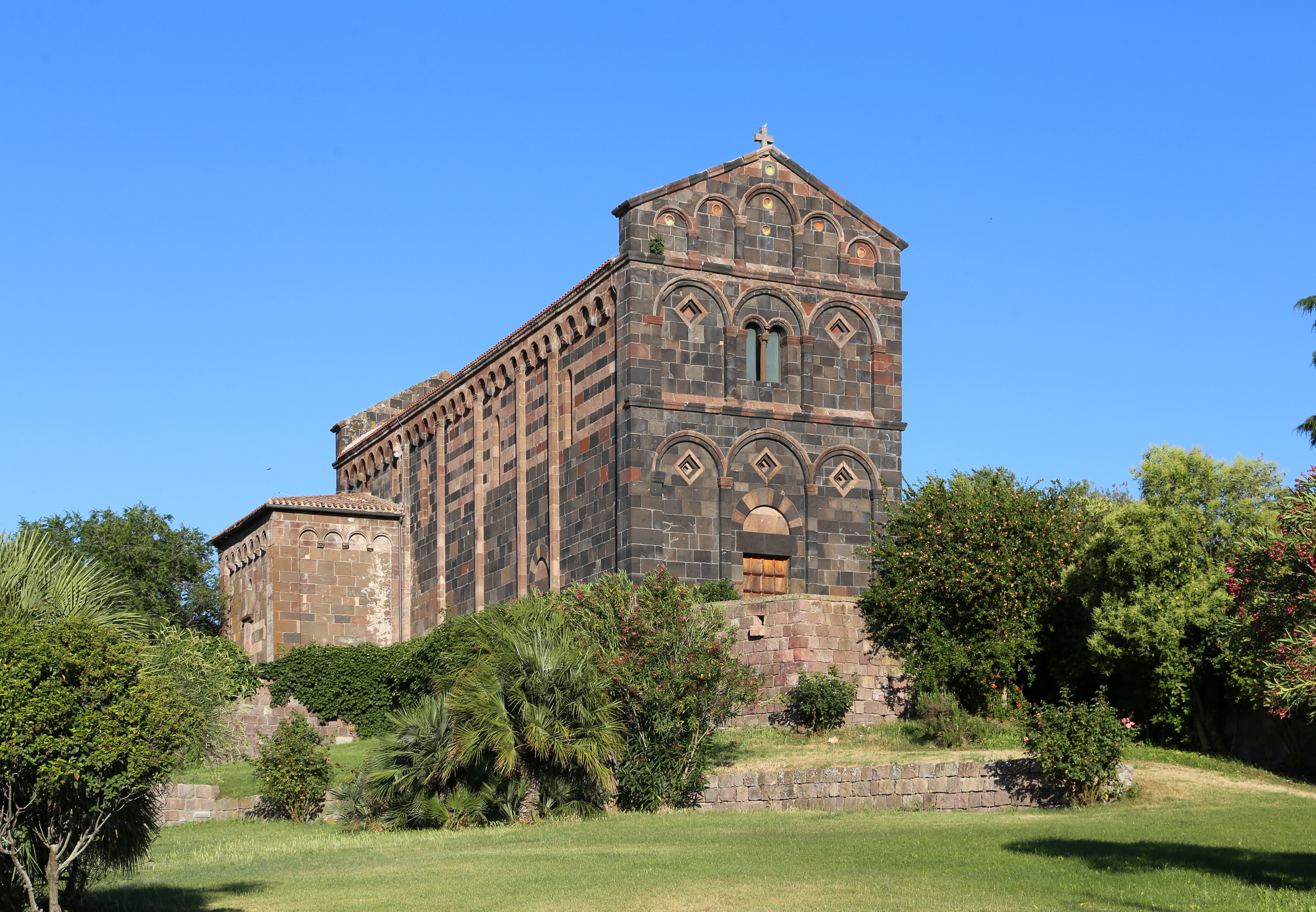
San Nicola, Ottana

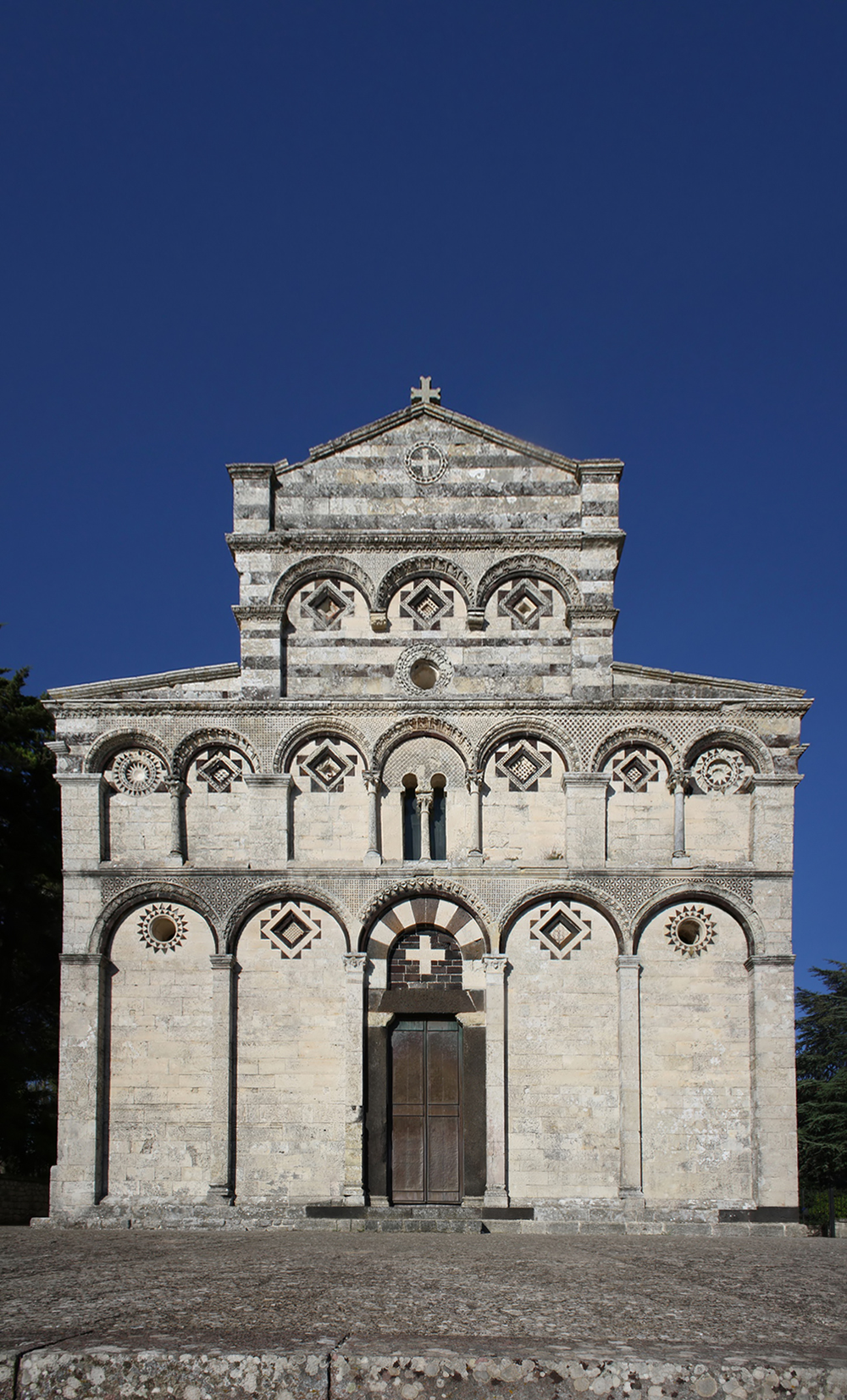
San Pietro di Sorres, Borutta

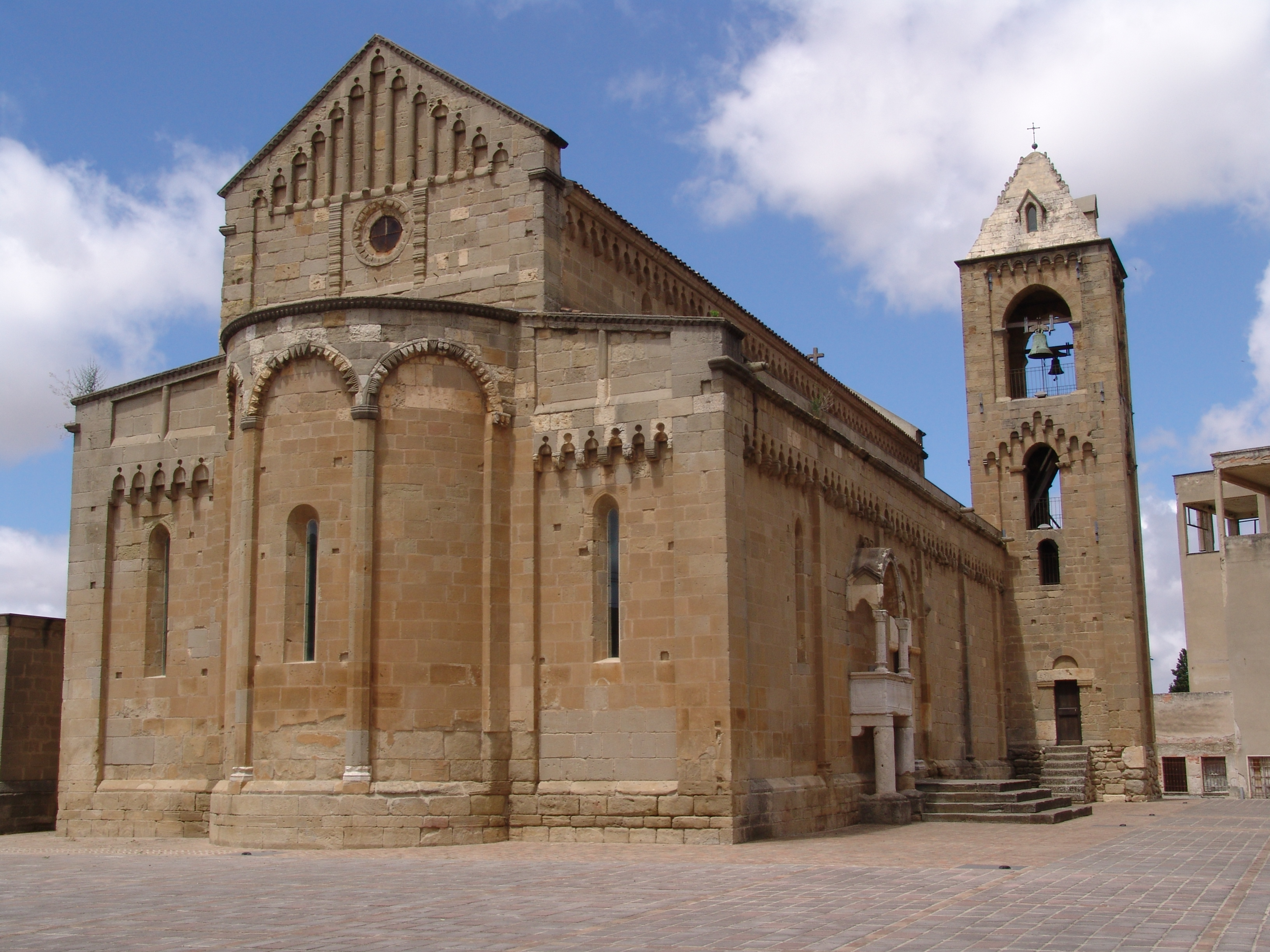
Cathedral of San Pantaleo, Dolianova

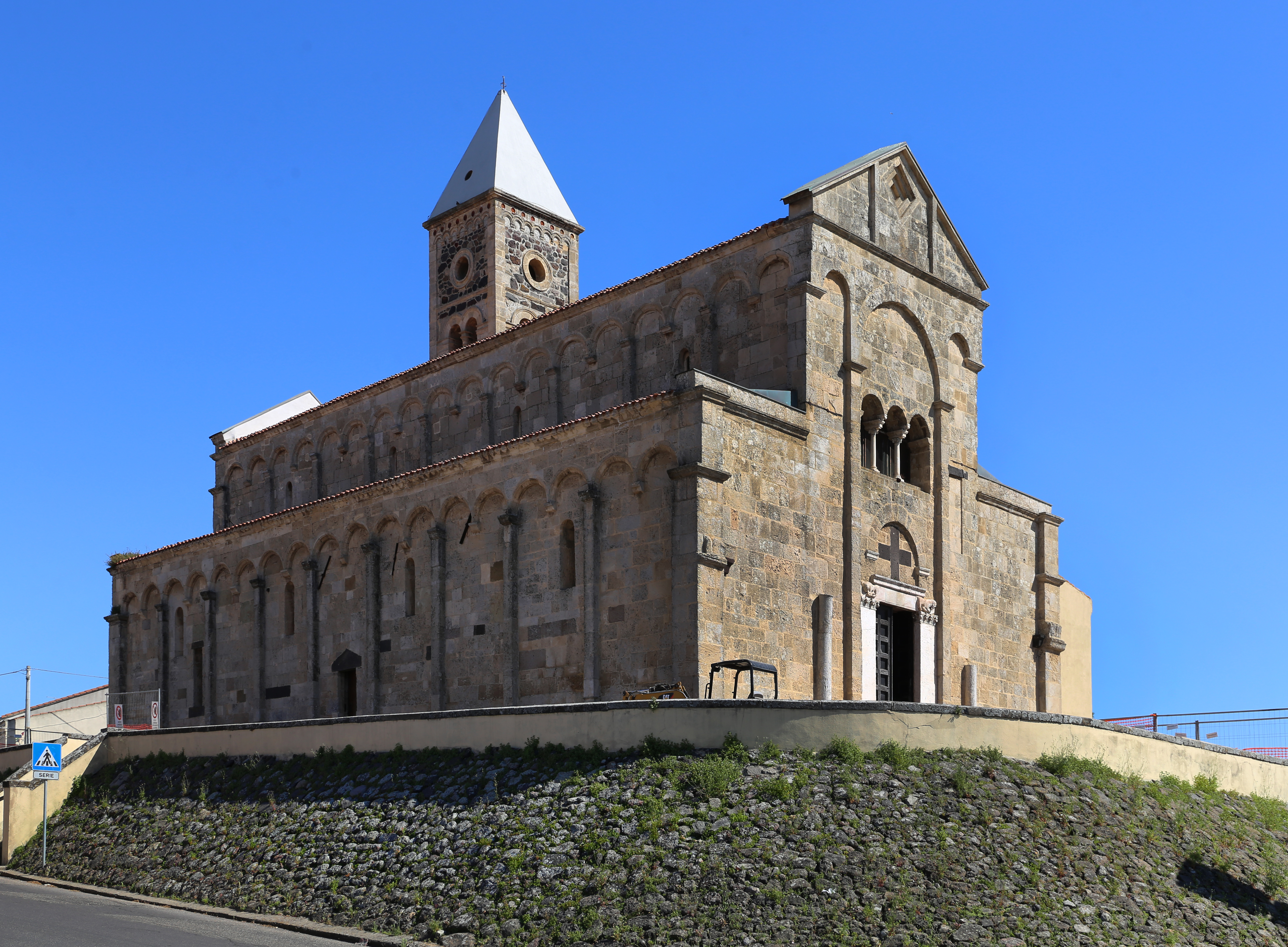
Cathedral of Santa Giusta, Santa Giusta

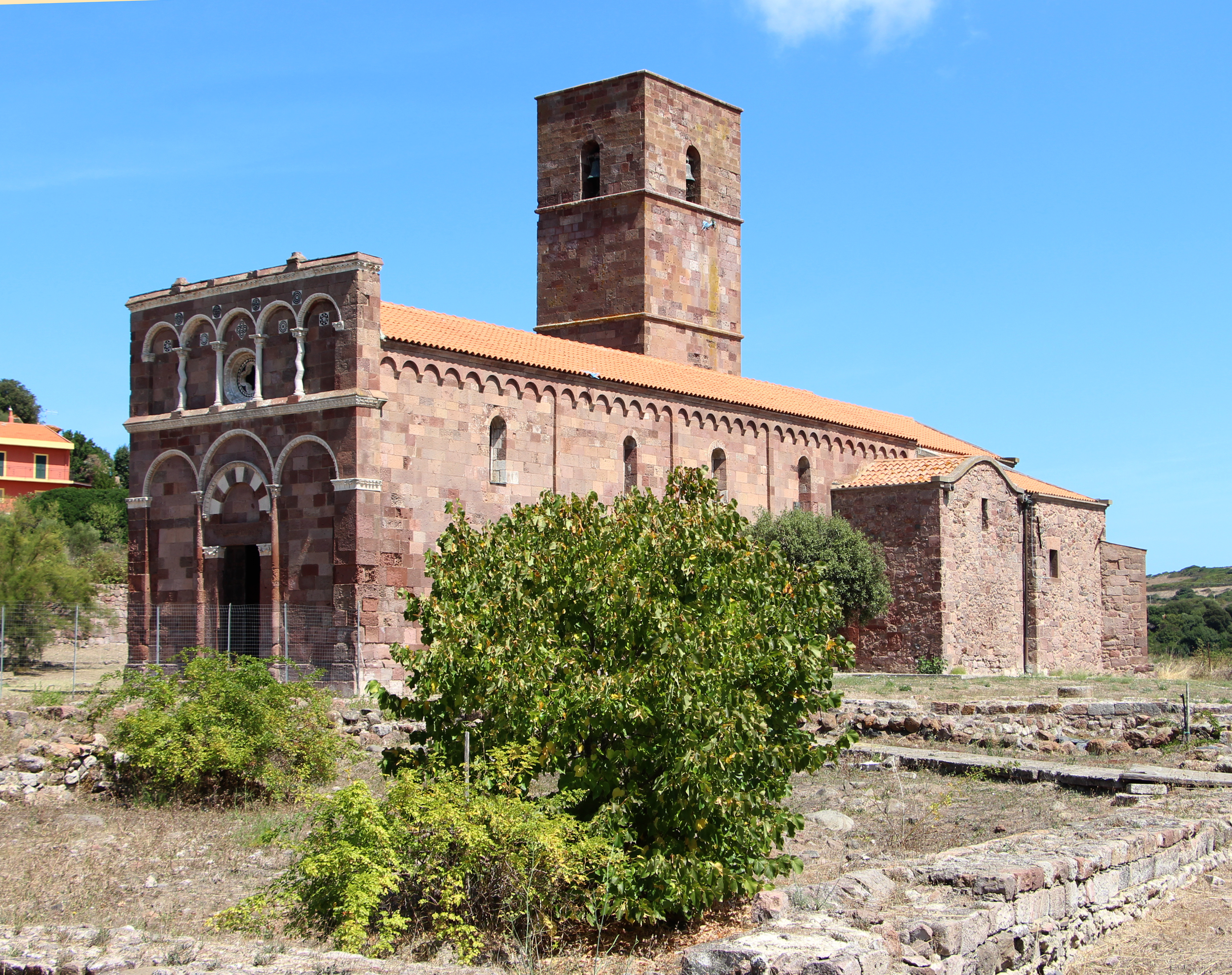
Nostra Signora of Tergu

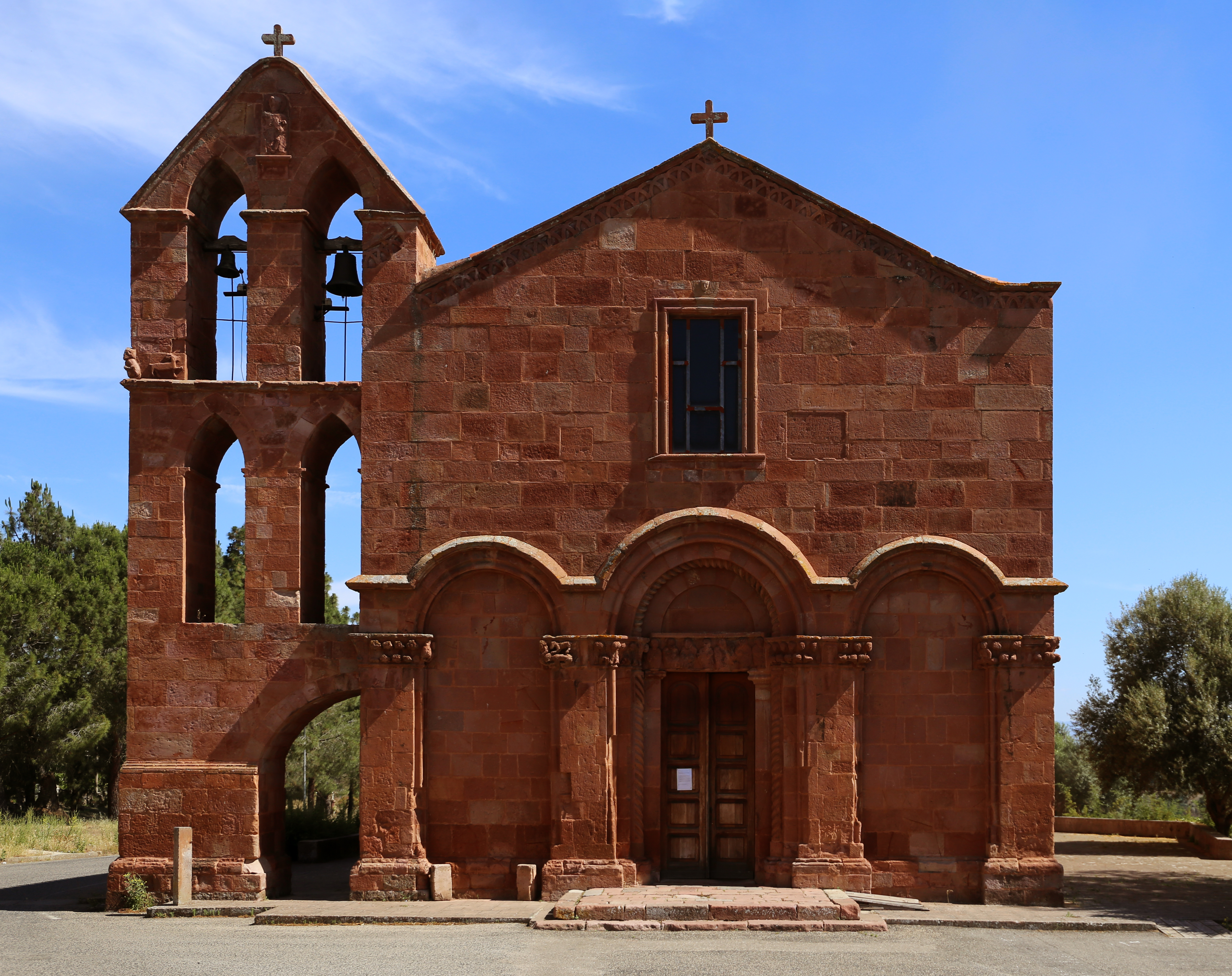
Church of San Pietro di Zuri, Ghilarza

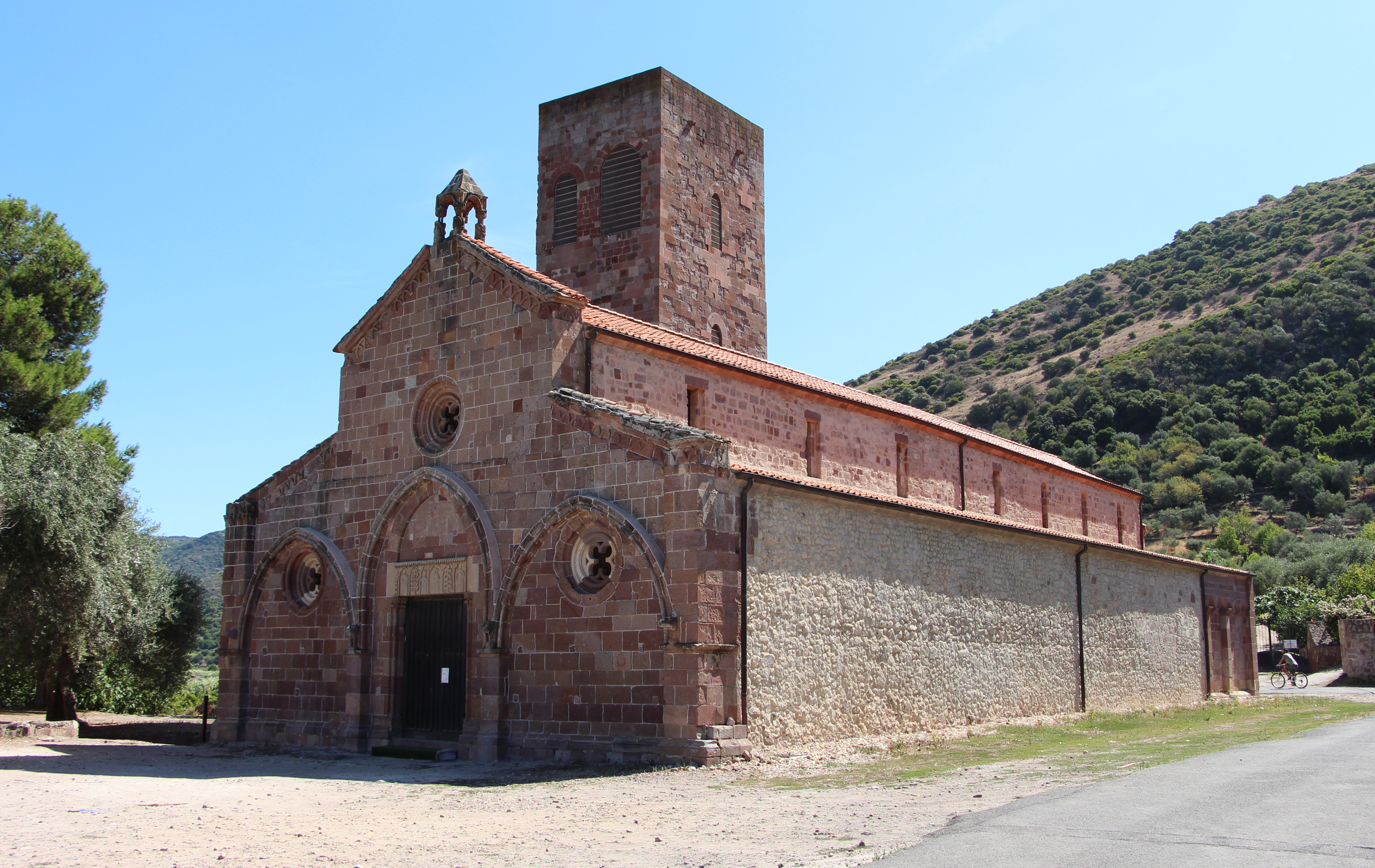
Church of San Pietro Extramuros, Bosa

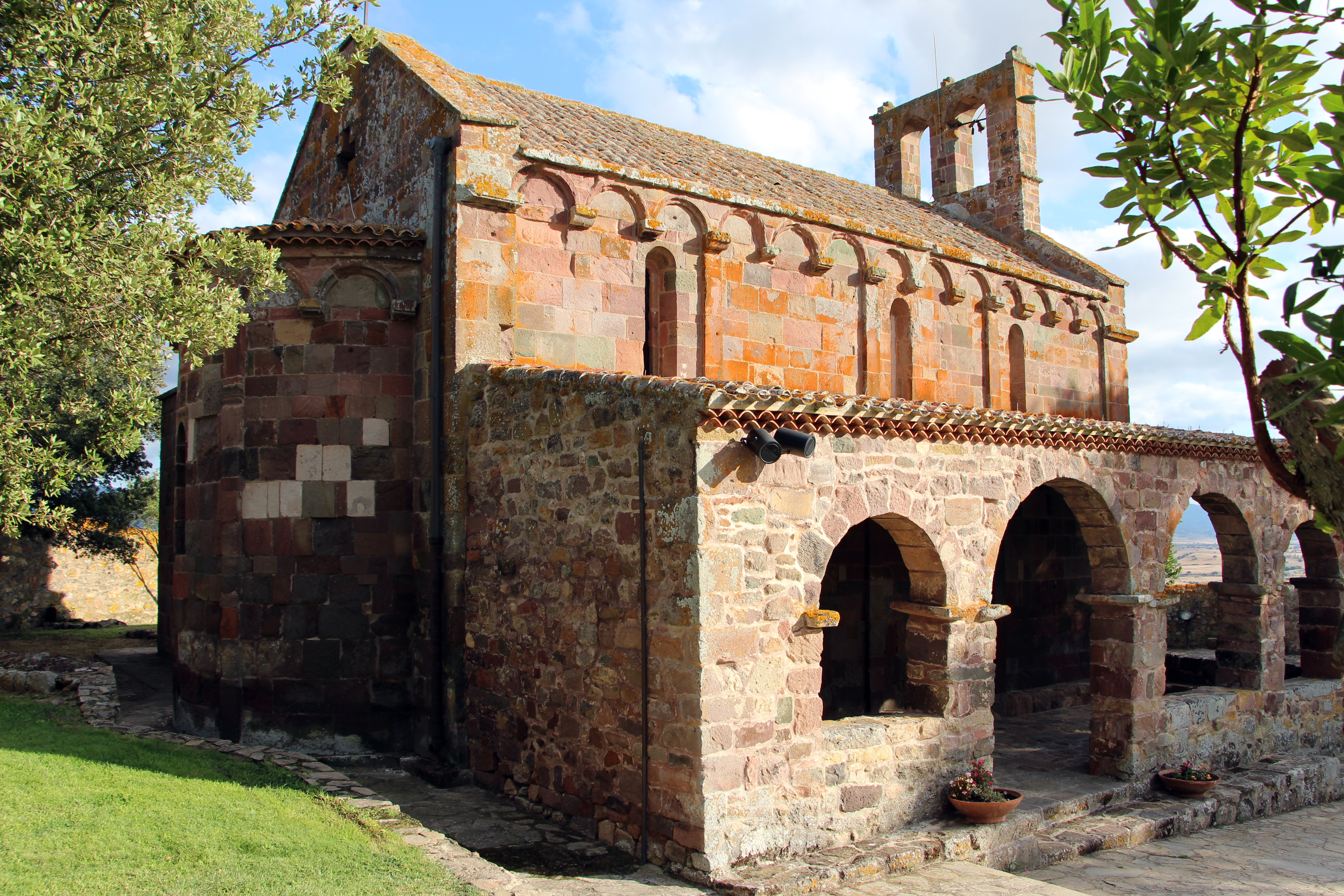
Church of Nostra Signora of Castro, Oschiri

== See also ==
- Architecture of Sardinia

== Bibliography ==
- Rassu, Massimo (2008). Templari e ospitalieri in Sardegna. Dolianova. ISBN 978-88-89978-60-3. ISBN 9788889978603
- Pittui, Frank (2005). Note sulle genealogie e la poetica della chiesa di San Nicola di Silanos. Sedini. in Sacer, n. 12. Sassari. (presente on line sul sito Indipendentzia.net.
- VV., AA. (1997). Speciale Anglona Medievale in Sardegna Antica.
- Coroneo, Roberto (1993). Architettura romanica dalla metà del Mille al primo '300. Nuoro: Ilisso. ISBN 88-85098-24-X.
- Serra, Renata (1988). Sardegna Romanica. Milano: Jaca Book. ISBN 88-16-60096-9.
- Sari, Aldo (1981). Nuove testimonianze architettoniche per la conoscenza del Medioevo in Sardegna in Archivio Storico Sardo vol. XXXII.
- VV., AA. (1988). I Cistercensi in Sardegna. in Rivista Cistercense.
- Argan, Giulio Carlo (1978). L'architettura protocristiana, preromanica e romanica. Bari.
- Zanetti, Ginevra (1976). I Cistercensi in Sardegna - Le abbazie di S. Maria di Corte, di Paulis e di Coros. in « Archivio Storico Sardo di Sassari».
- Boscolo, Alberto (1958). L'abbazia di San Vittore, Pisa e la Sardegna. Padova.
- Delogu, Raffaello (1953). L 'Architettura del Medioevo in Sardegna. Roma. (ristampa anastatica, Sassari, 1988)
- Scano, Dionigi (1929). Chiese Medioevali di Sardegna. Firenze. (ristampa anastatica, Cagliari, 1991)
- Salvatore Chessa, L'insediamento umano medioevale nella curatoria di Montes (Comuni di Osilo e Tergu), Sassari, Magnum, 2002, scheda "Bualis-Bainzolu", pp. 145–51 (per la collocazione della chiesa cassinese di Santa Maria in Bubalis o Bualis nell'attuale territorio di Tergu).
