= Piazza Tasso =

Piazza Tasso may refer to:

- Piazza Tasso, Sorrento, Italy
- Piazza Tasso, Florence, Italy
