= Santa Maria, Uta =

Church in Uta, Italy

Coordinates: 39.2863°N 8.9699°E

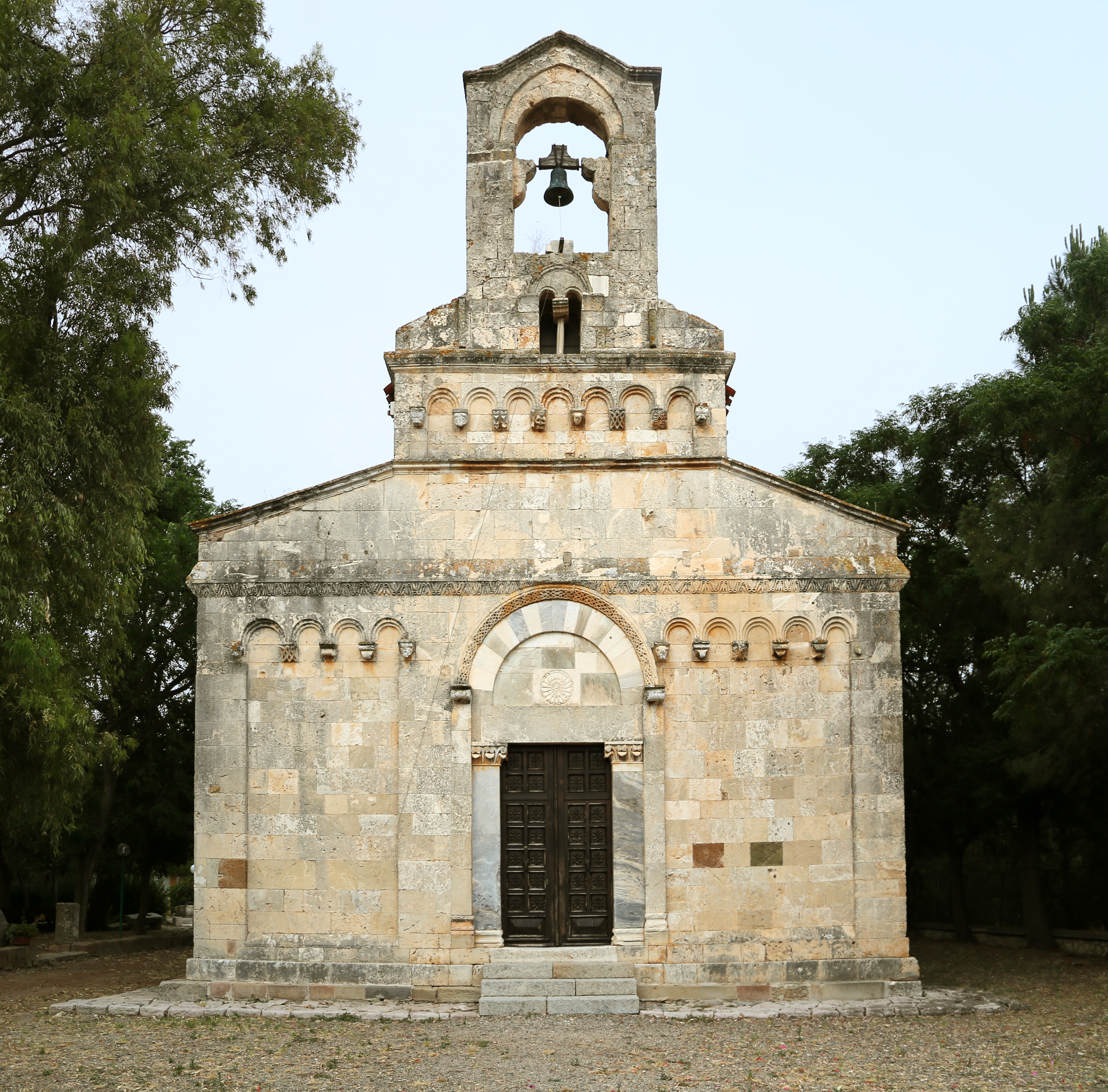
Façade of the church.

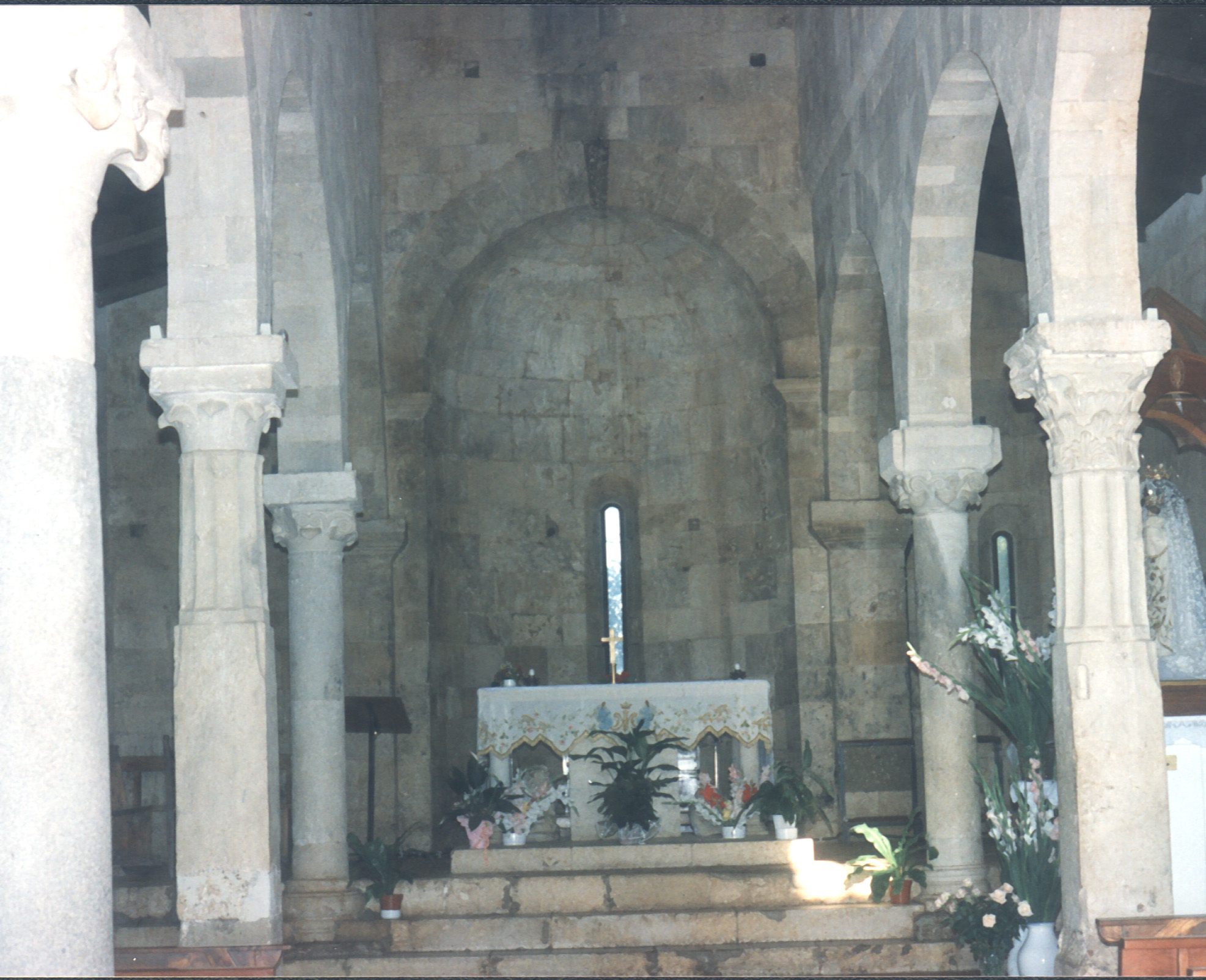
The interior of the church.

Santa Maria is a medieval church in the comune of Uta, Sardinia, Italy.

The exact date of construction is unknown, although it is generally assigned to the mid-12th century by monks from the Abbey of St. Victor in Marseille, perhaps on the ruins of a pre-existing structure. It is an example of Provençal and Tuscan Romanesque styles' influence on the local medieval architecture (at the time the area was under the influence of the Republic of Pisa).

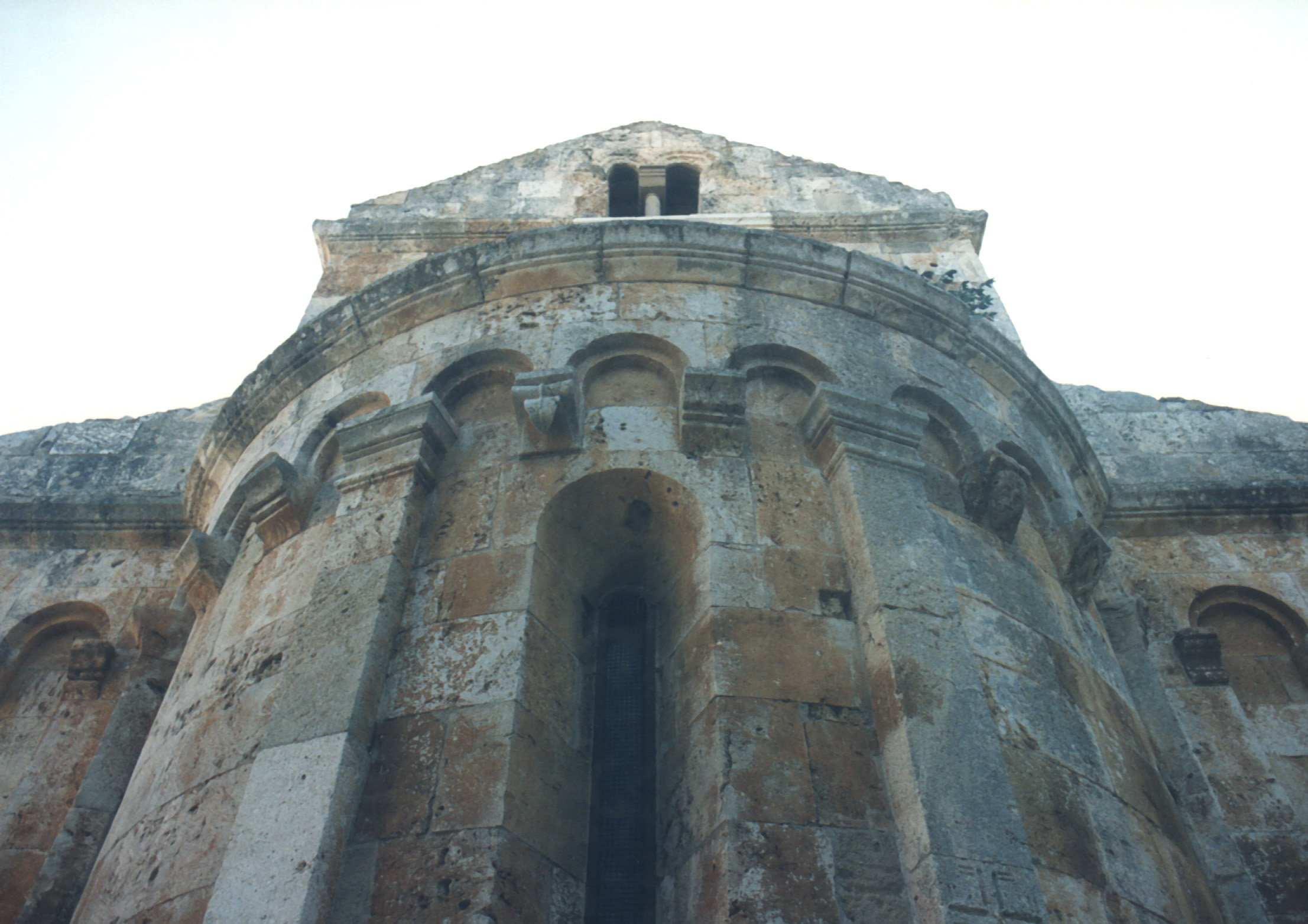
Apse view.

The oldest known mention of the church is in a 1363 document, by which king Peter IV of Aragon switched it from the Knights Hospitaller to the Order of Sant Jordi d'Alfama. The edifice was later held by the Franciscans, who, in the late 16th century, gave it to the archdiocese of Cagliari.

== Description ==
The exterior is built in limestone and sandstone, with parts in marble and basalt. The walls feature pilasters at the corners, and are divided by lesenes among which are Lombard bands (triple in the façade and double at the sides and in the apse area). The Lombard bands are characterized by bases with various sculptures of human and animal figures.

The main façade, pointing westwards, has a flat central bell tower and is divided into four levels by frames. The lower part is in turn divided into three sections: the middle one houses the portal, which is surmounted by a rounded arch in two colors and a finely sculpted motif in the frame. The upper section has a small double mullioned window.

The church has a nave and two aisles with wooden ceilings, separated by round arches; these are supported by columns from older Roman edifices. The capitals are instead contemporary of the church, aside from two (including one acting as holy water font). The presbytery is elevated and accessed by two steps. Under the high altar are two sculpted lions, which were originally placed at the sides of the façade. The presbytery ends in a semicircular apse. Light is provided by two double mullioned windows in the eastern and western walls and by single mullioned windows in the main walls and the apse.

== See also ==
- Romanesque architecture in Sardinia

== Sources ==
- Coroneo, Roberto (1993). Architettura Romanica dalla metà del Mille al primo '300. Nuoro: Ilisso. ISBN 88-85098-24-X.
- Delogu, Raffaello (1953). L'architettura del Medioevo in Sardegna. Rome.
