= Uta, Sardinia =

Uta Uda (Sardinian)
- Comune
- Comune di Uta
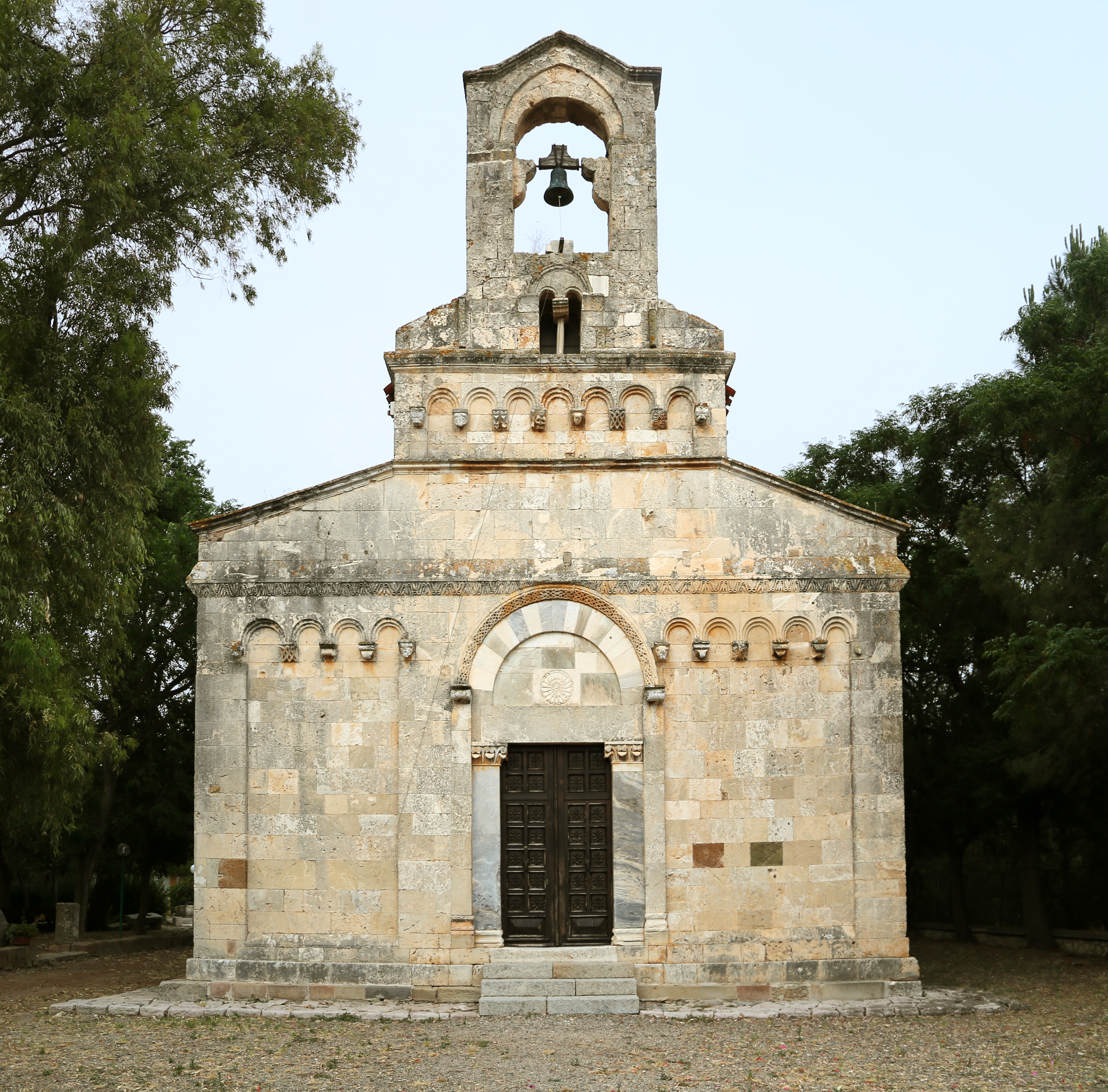
- Church of Santa Maria

- Coat of arms

- Location within Sardinia
- Coordinates: 39°17′N 8°57′E
- Country: Italy
- Region: Sardinia
- Metropolitan city: Cagliari (CA)

Government
  - Mayor: Paolo Angioni

Area
  - Total: 134.4 km^{2} (51.9 sq mi)
- Elevation: 6 m (20 ft)

Population (2025)
  - Total: 8,914
  - Density: 66.32/km^{2} (171.8/sq mi)
- Demonym: Utesi
- Time zone: UTC+1 (CET)
  - Summer (DST): UTC+2 (CEST)
- Postal code: 09010
- Dialing code: 070
- Website: Official website

Uta (Sardinian: Uda), is a comune (municipality) in the Metropolitan City of Cagliari in the Italian region of Sardinia, located about 15 kilometres (9 mi) northwest of Cagliari. It has 8,914 inhabitants.

The main attraction is the Romanesque church of Santa Maria. In the area near Monte Arcosu were found also some Nuragic bronzes, in 1849.

Uta borders the following municipalities: Assemini, Capoterra, Decimomannu, Siliqua, Villaspeciosa.

== Demographics ==
Historical population

Year	Pop.	±%
1861	1,723	—
1871	1,594	−7.5%
1881	1,539	−3.5%
1901	1,640	+6.6%
1911	1,956	+19.3%
1921	2,042	+4.4%
1931	2,216	+8.5%
1936	2,396	+8.1%

Year	Pop.	±%
1951	3,314	+38.3%
1961	4,421	+33.4%
1971	5,027	+13.7%
1981	5,696	+13.3%
1991	6,317	+10.9%
2001	6,692	+5.9%
2011	7,859	+17.4%
2021	8,671	+10.3%

Source: ISTAT

== People ==
- Angie (Italian singer) (born 2001), singer-songwriter
