= Condaghe =

Kind of administrative document

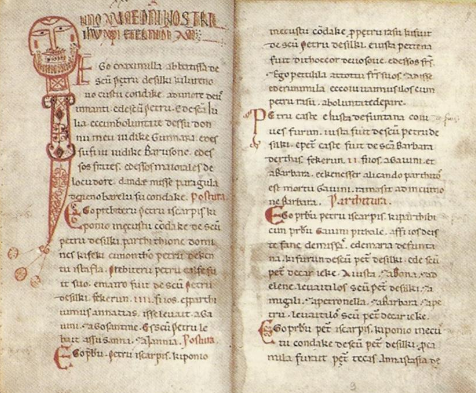
The condaghe of Saint Peter of Silki (1065-1180), written in Sardinian.

A condaghe (Sardinian pronunciation: [kɔɳˈɖaɣɛ]; also spelled as condache or condake, pronounced [kɔɳˈɖakɛ]), also known as a fundaghe, was a kind of administrative document used in the Sardinian judicates between the 11th and 13th centuries. They are one of the earliest witnesses for the development of the Sardinian language and are an important source for historians of medieval Sardinia. The word derives from the medieval Sardinian term kondake, from Medieval Greek: κοντάκιον, romanized: kontákion, lit. 'the pole around which a scroll is wound'.

The original condaghes (later italianized into condaghi) were collections of acts of donations to churches or monasteries. Later condaghes were kept by noble families for recording inheritances, purchases, donations (datura), transactions (tramutu) and litigation (kertu), principally when relating to the church. The chief object of such records was to provide precise dates in case of legal dispute.

Physically, the first condaghes were scrolls: overlapping parchment manuscripts wound tightly around a kontákion. Over time they took on the familiar form of a codex (like modern books). They were produced in the scriptoria of monasteries and cathedrals, but the great majority have been lost. Only some condaghes have been preserved, with most of them being of ecclesiastical kind like the condaghes of the monasteries of Saint Mary of Bonarcado (Sancte Marie de Monarcanto or Bonorcadu), Saint Michael of Salvennor (San Miguel de Salvennor, of which we have only a translation into Spanish from an original Sardinian copy), Saint Nicola of Trullas (Sanctu Nichola de Trullas), Saint Peter of Silki (Sanctu Petru de Silki), and of the Basilica of San Gavino (Sanctu Gavinu). There is only a single condaghe of laical kind left, the one of Judge Barisone II of Logudoro.
