= San Nicola di Trullas =

Church in Semestene, Italy

Church of San Nicola di Trullas San Nicola di Trullas (in Italian)
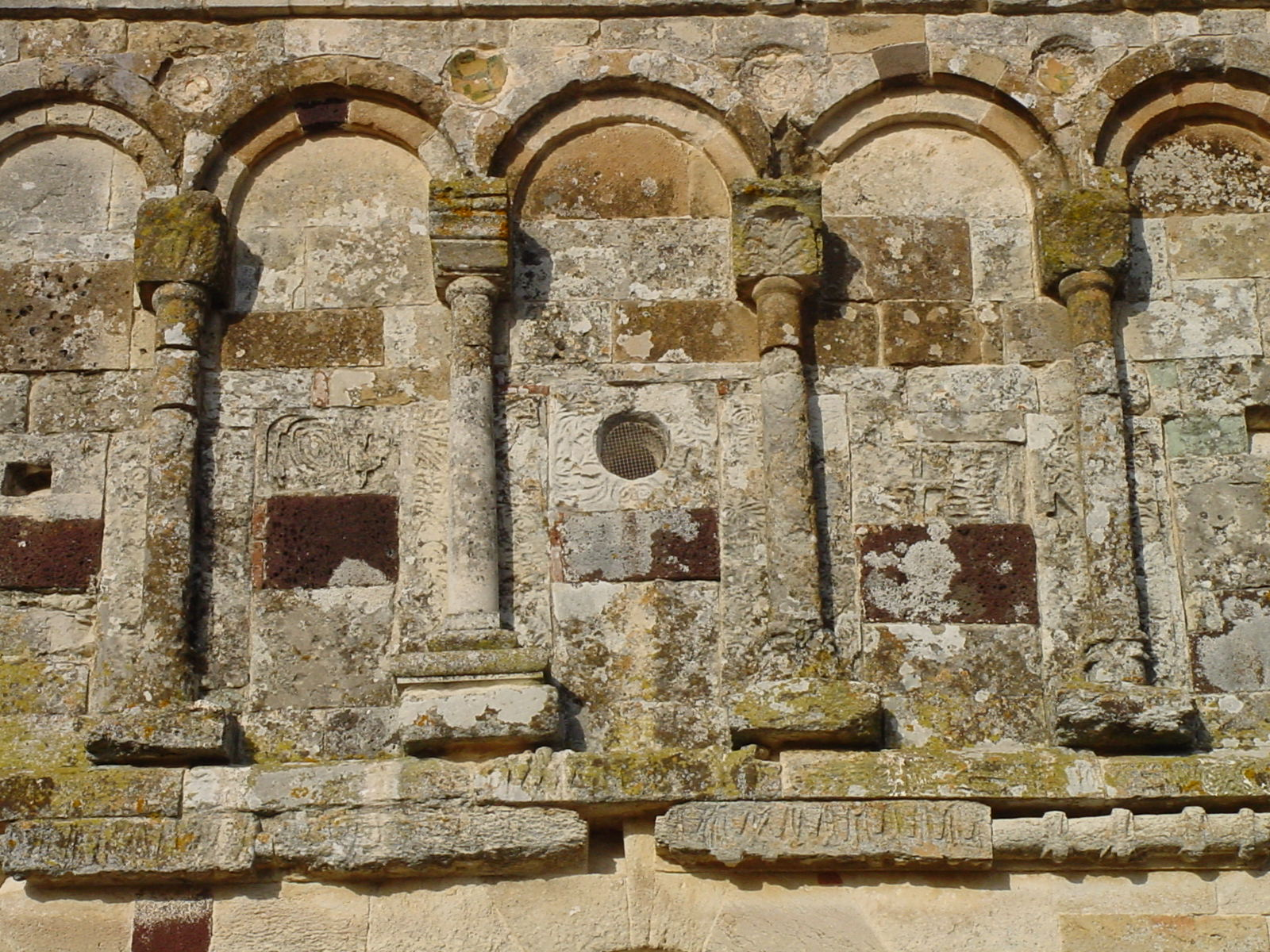
- Detail view of the facade

Religion
- Affiliation: Roman Catholic
- Province: Archdiocese of Sassari
- Rite: Latin Rite

Location
- Location: Semestene, Italy
- Interactive map of Church of San Nicola di Trullas; San Nicola di Trullas (in Italian)
- Coordinates: 40°23′36″N 8°42′16″E

Architecture
- Type: Church
- Style: Romanesque
- Groundbreaking: 12th century

San Nicola di Trullas (Sardinian: Santu Nicolau de Truddas or Sanctu Nichola de Trullas) is a countryside church between the communes of Semestene and Pozzomaggiore, in the province of Sassari, Sardinia, Italy

== History and description ==
The church was built by the Athen family of Pozzomaggiore, belonging to the Giudicale aristocracy, who donated it to the Camaldolese monks. The deed of donation was signed by Pietro de Athen on 29 October of 1113, with the consent of Constantine I of Torres and bishop Albert of the Roman Catholic Diocese of Sorres entrusted the church with all the peretinences to San Salvatore a Camaldoli., on a parchment which is currently kept in the State Archives of Florence.

The church, of very small dimensions (6 m. X 12 m.), is nevertheless of excellent workmanship. The building is generated by the juxtaposition of two cubes with cross vaults and an apse with a semicatino vault. According to Raffaello Delogu, the construction scheme is based on the duplication of a Lombard span, as already happened in the palatine chapel of Santa Maria del Regno in Ardara and in the church of San Nicola di Silanis in Sedini.

The interior has cross vaults and several frescoes. Near the church there was also a convent, of which only ruins remain, where the homonymous condaghe was compiled. That condaghe is a valuable source for medieval Sardinian history.

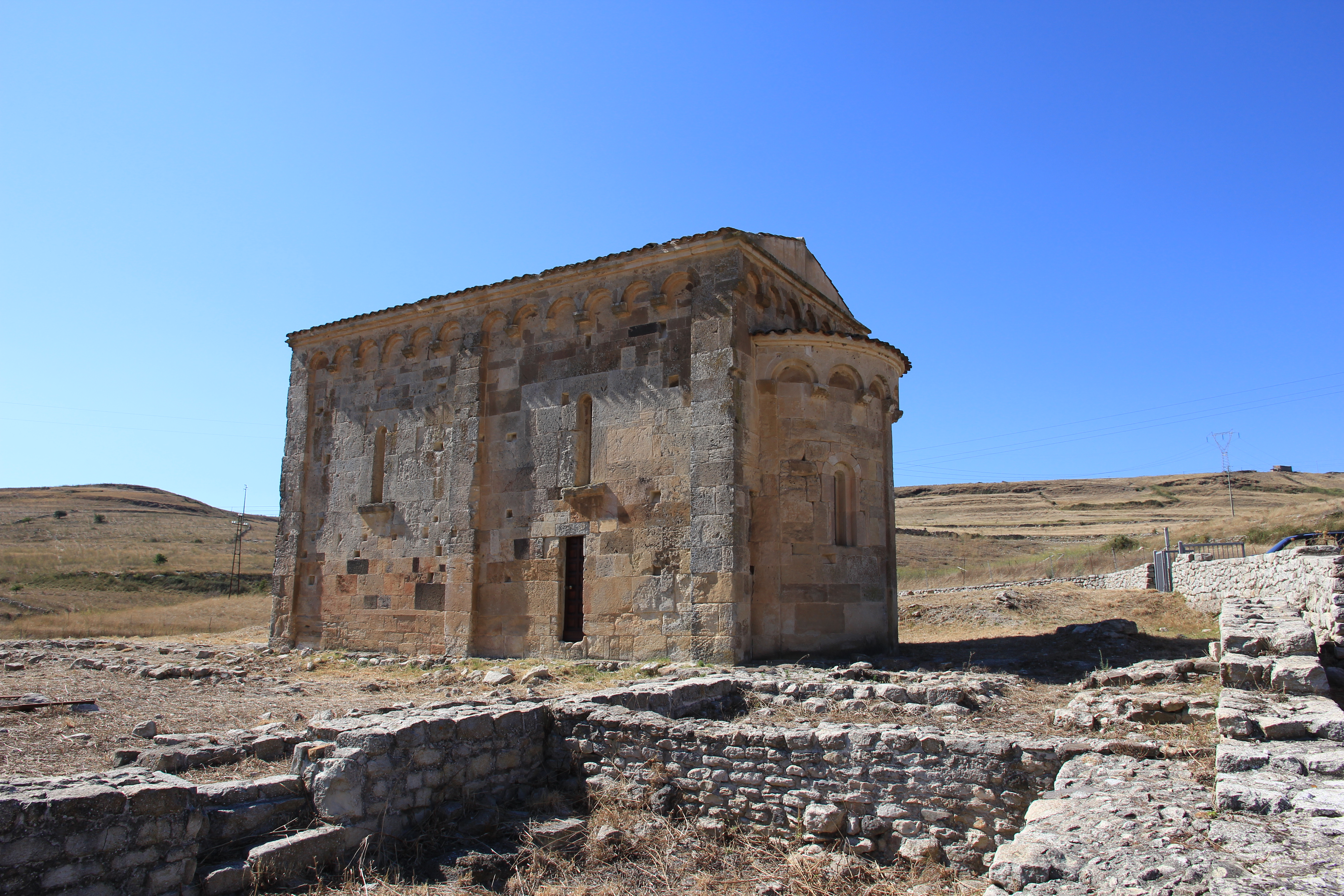
The church and in the foreground the remains of the convent are visible
