= Abbey of St Victor, Marseille =

Abbey in Bouches-du-Rhône, France

Coordinates: 43°17′25″N 5°21′56″E

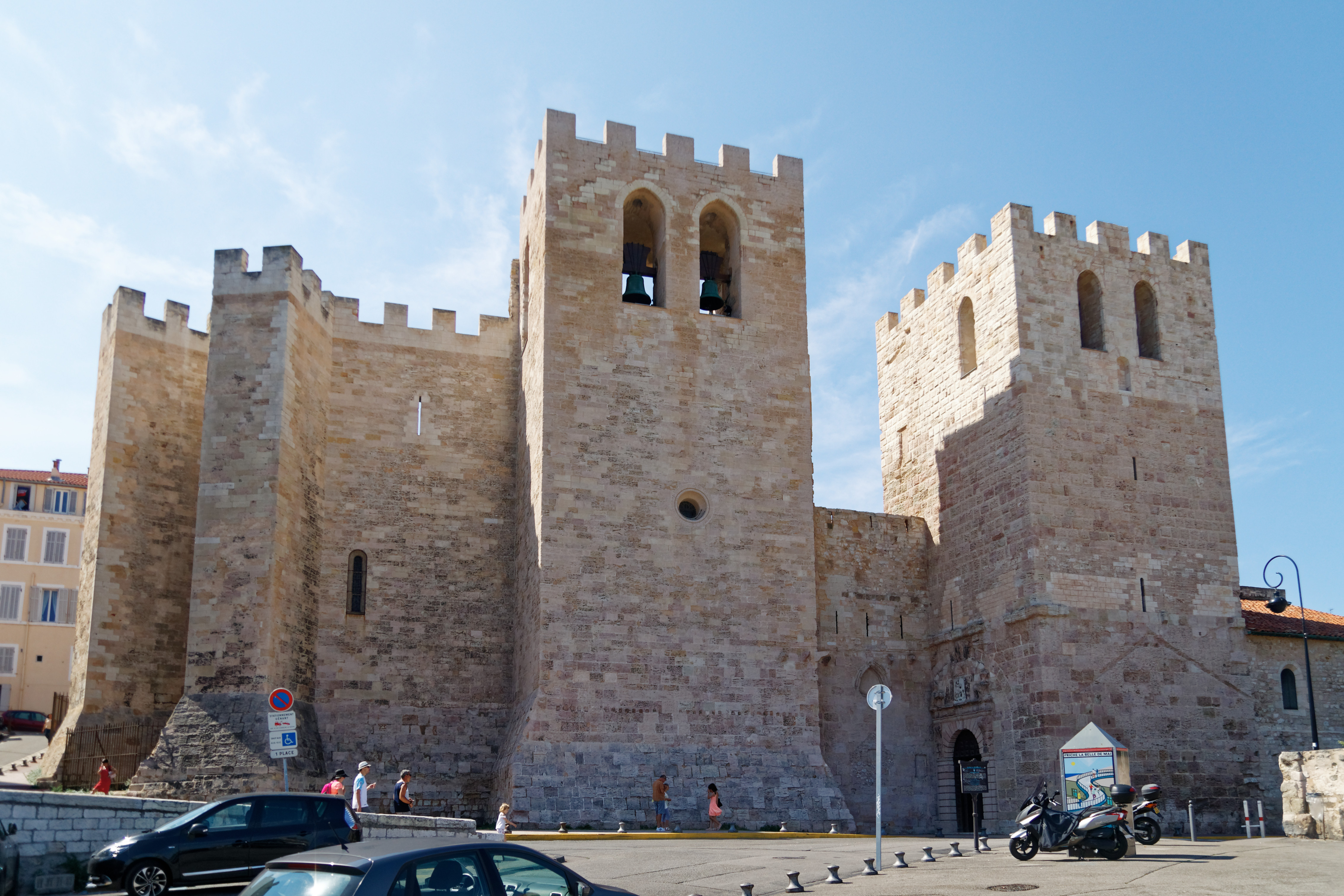
Abbey of St Victor, Marseille

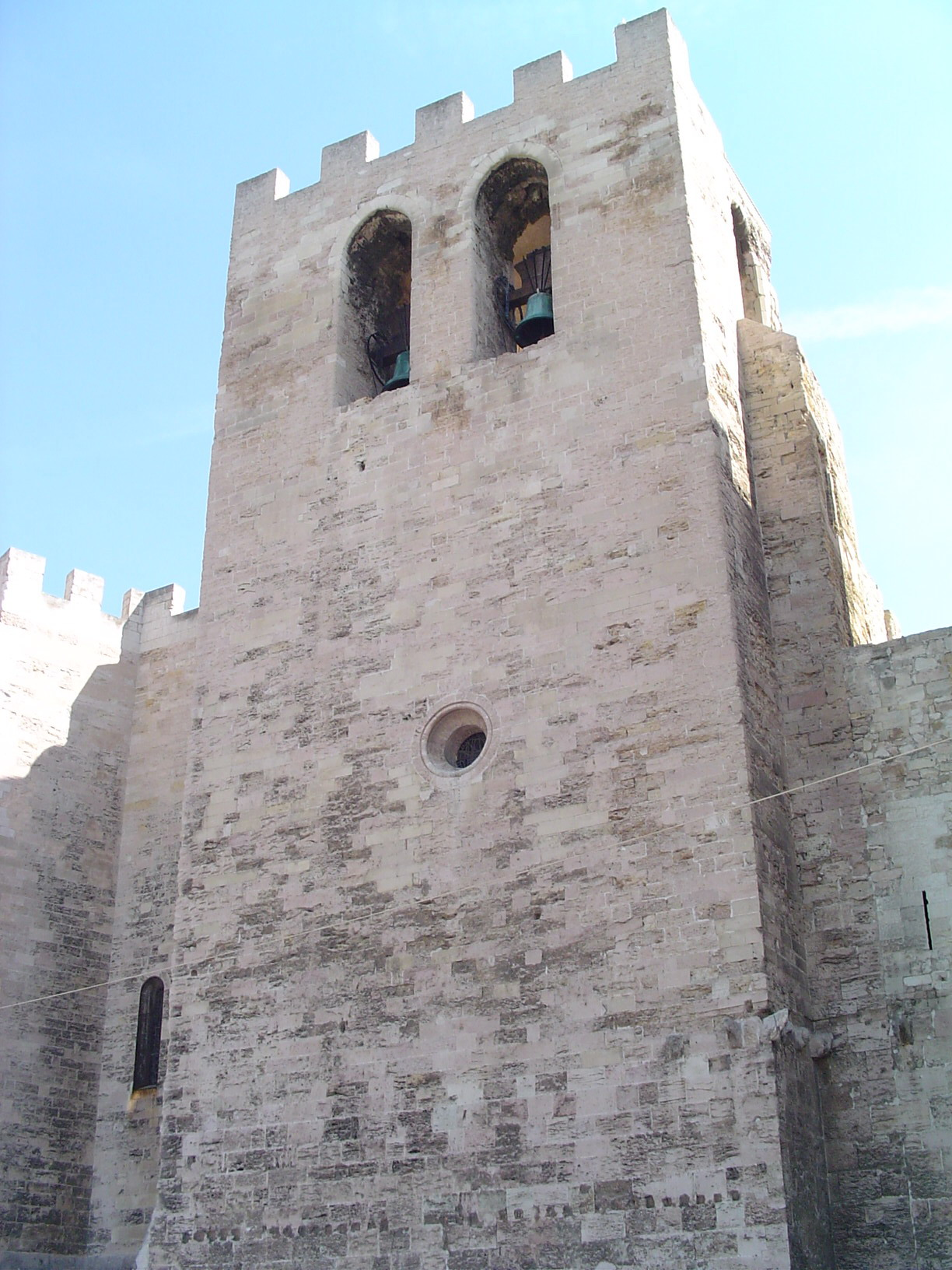
Fortified tower of the Abbey of St. Victor

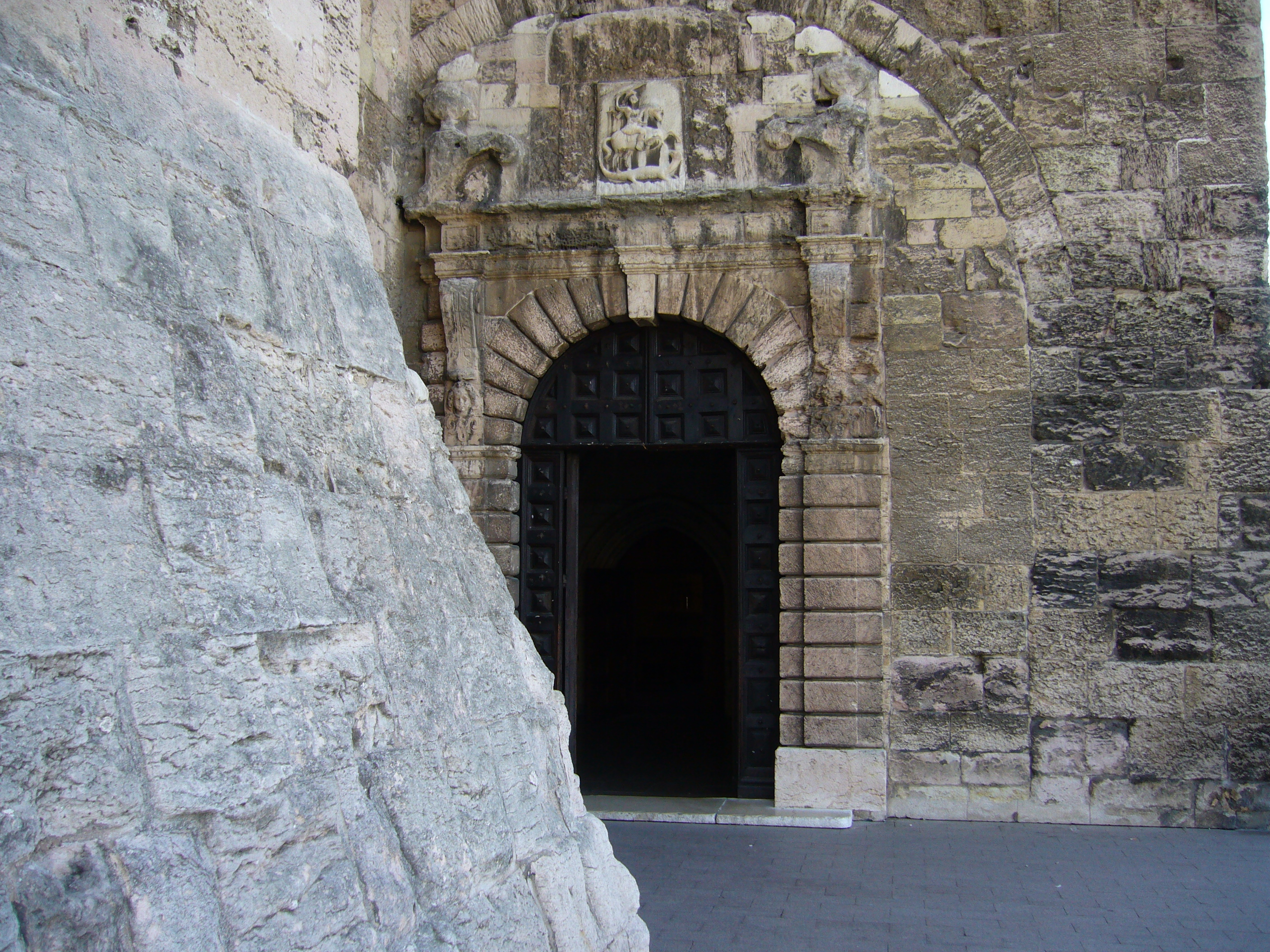
Entrance to abbey church

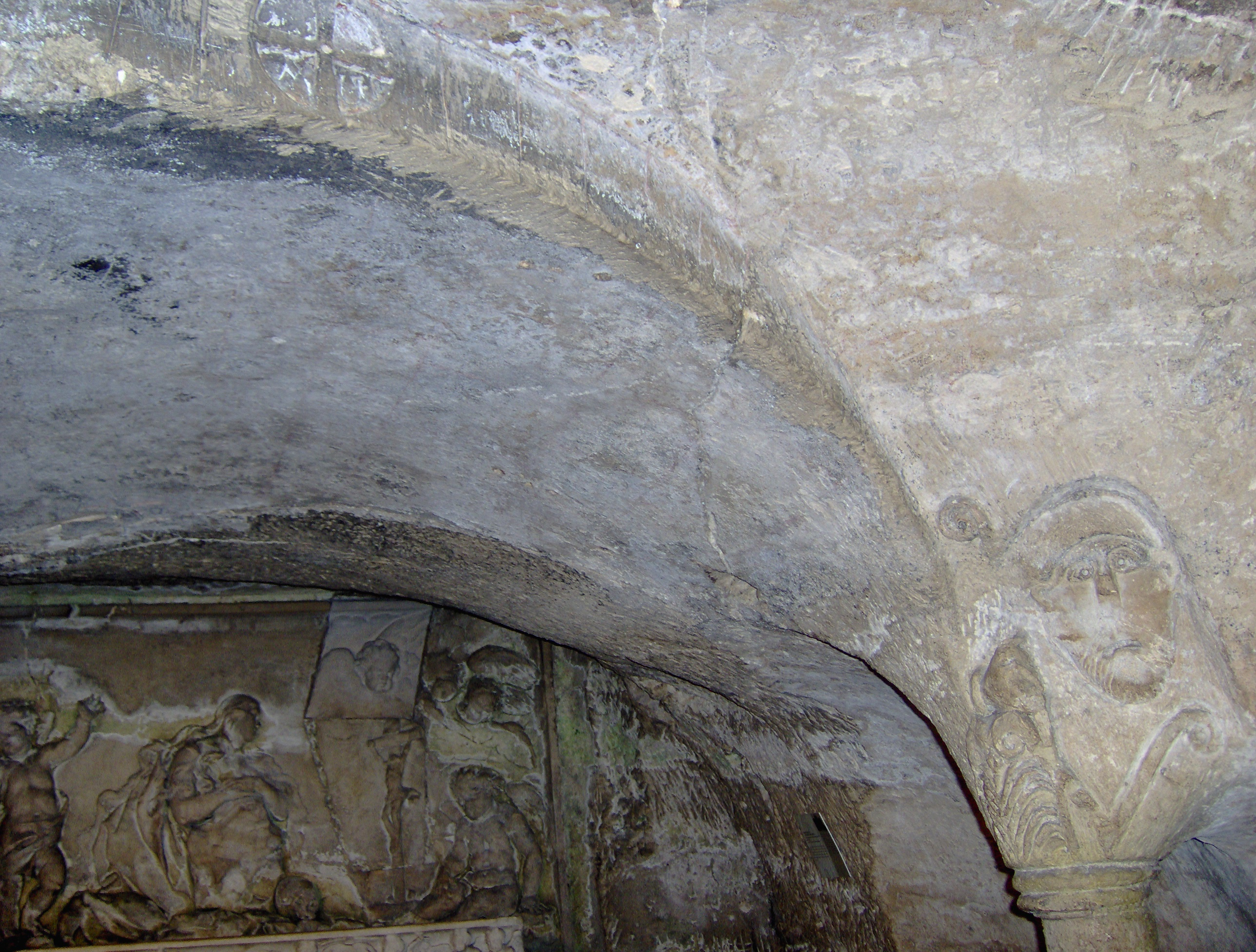
Crypt

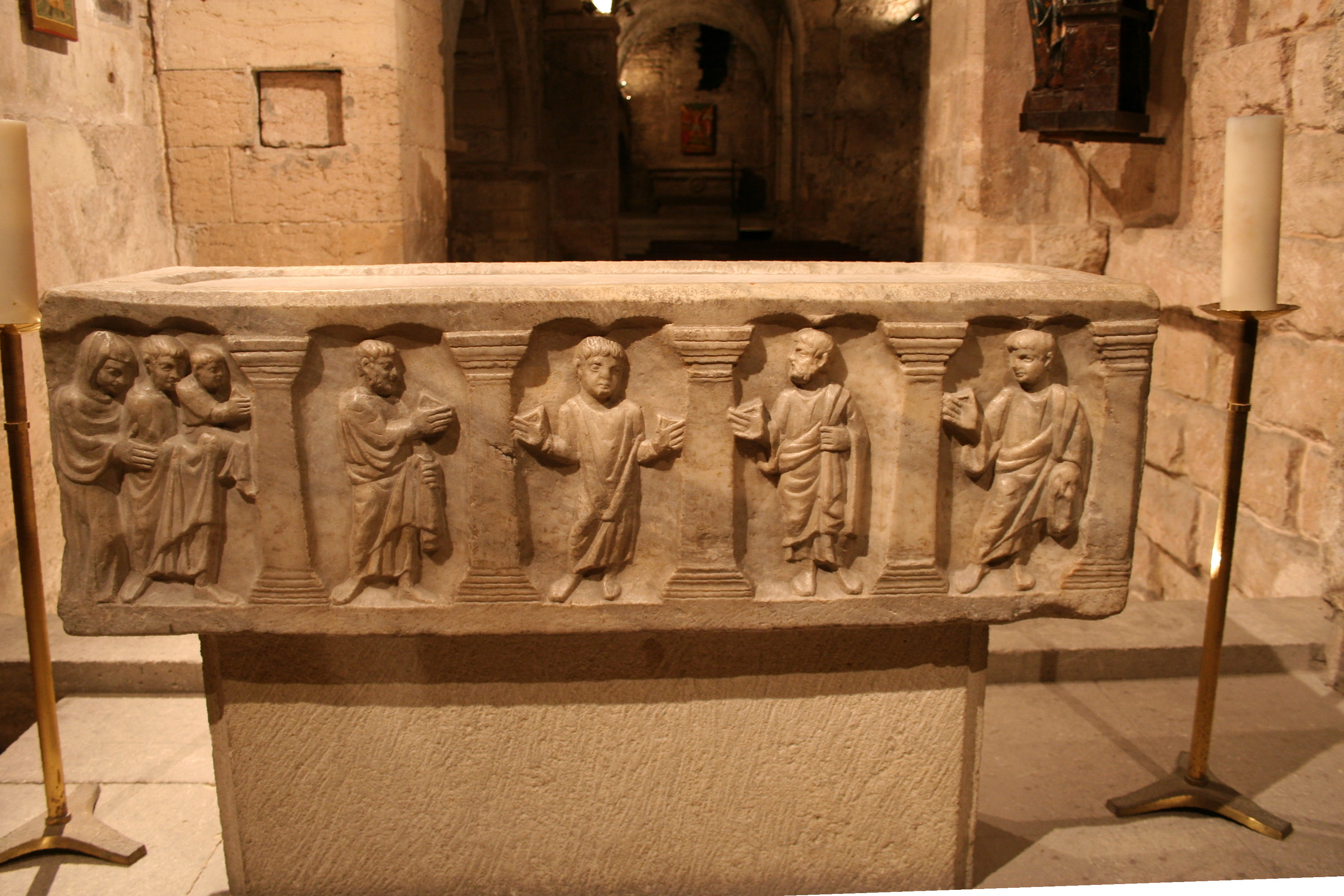
Sarcophagus of John Cassian

The Abbey of Saint-Victor, Marseille (Occitan: Abadiá de Sant Victor, Marselha) is a former abbey that was founded during the late Roman period in Marseille in the south of France, named after the local soldier saint and martyr Victor of Marseilles.

== History ==
The crypts of the abbey contains artefacts indicating the presence of a quarry that was active during the Greek period and later became a necropolis from 2 BC onward until Christian times.

In 415, Christian monk and theologian John Cassian, having come from the monasteries of Egypt, founded two monasteries at Marseille — the Abbey of Saint Victor for men in the south of the Vieux-Port, as well as the Abbey of Saint Sauveur the other for women in the south of Place de Lenche. The Abbey of Saint Victor was later affected during the fifth century by the Semipelagian heresy, which began with some of Cassian's writings. Both monasteries suffered from invasions by the Vikings and Saracens, and were destroyed in 838 by a Saracen fleet, when the then-abbess Saint Eusebia was also martyred with 39 nuns. In 923, the Abbey of Saint-Victor was destroyed again by the Saracens.

In 977, monastic life was restored in the abbey under the Rule of Saint Benedict through the efforts of Bishop Honorat and its first Benedictine abbot Saint Wiffred. It recovered quickly, and from the middle of the 11th century its abbots were requested to restore religious life in the surrounding monasteries that had become decadent.

Saint Isarn (d. 1048), a Catalan monk and successor as abbot to Wiffred, began construction work in 1020, building the first upper church, tower and altar. Isarn was instrumental by his intercession with Ramon Berenguer I, Count of Barcelona, in obtaining the release from Moorish captivity of the monks of Lérins Abbey. Blessed Bernard, abbot of St. Victor from 1064 to 1079, was one of the two ambassadors delegated by Pope Gregory VII to the Diet of Forchheim, where the German princes deposed Henry IV, Holy Roman Emperor. He was seized by one of the partisans of Henry IV and passed several months in prison. Pope Gregory VII also sent him as legate to Spain and in reward for his services exempted St. Victor's from all jurisdiction other than that of the Holy See.

The abbey long retained contact with the princes of Spain and Sardinia and even owned property in Syria. The polyptych of Saint Victor, compiled in 814, the large chartulary (end of the 11th and beginning of the 12th century), and the small chartulary (middle of the 13th century), containing documents from 683 to 1336, document the economic importance of the abbey in the Middle Ages.

Blessed Guillaume Grimoard, who was made abbot of Saint-Victor on 2 August 1361, became pope in 1362 as Urban V. He enlarged the church and surrounded the abbey with high crenellated walls. He also granted the abbot episcopal jurisdiction, and gave him as his diocese the suburbs and villages south of the city. Urban V visited Marseille in October 1365, consecrated the high altar of the church. He returned to St. Victor's in May 1367, and held a consistory in the abbey. The abbey began to decline after this, especially from the early 16th century, when commendatory abbots acquired authority.

The loss of the important library of the Abbey of Saint-Victor, undocumented as it is, can probably be ascribed to the abuses of the commendatory abbots. The library's contents are known through an inventory of the latter half of the 12th century, and it was extremely rich in ancient manuscripts. It seems to have been dispersed in the latter half of the 16th century, probably between 1579 and 1591. It has been conjectured that when Giuliano di Pierfrancesco de' Medici was abbot, from 1570 to 1588, he broke up the library to please Catherine de' Medici, and it is very likely that all or many of the books became the property of the king.

In 1648 the échevins (municipal magistrates) of Marseille petitioned Pope Innocent X to secularise the monastery, because of the unsatisfactory behaviour of the monks. The Pope was not willing to do so but instead had the abbey taken over by the reformist Congregation of Saint Maur. Thomas le Fournier (1675–1745), monk of St. Victor's, left numerous manuscripts which greatly assisted them in their publications.

However, the behaviour of the monks generally did not improve, and after their highly unsatisfactory conduct during the plague of 1720, during which they barricaded themselves inside their walls instead of providing any assistance to the stricken, Pope Benedict XIII secularised the monastery in 1726, converting it into a collegiate church with a community of secular canons under an abbot. This was confirmed by a bull of Pope Clement XII dated 17 December 1739.

In 1774, it became by royal decree a noble chapter, the members of which had to be Provençals with four noble descents; from this date they bore the title of "chanoine comte de Saint-Victor".

The last abbot of Saint-Victor was Prince Louis François Camille de Lorraine Lambesc. He died in 1787 and was not replaced before the outbreak of the French Revolution.

== Buildings ==
In 1794 the abbey was stripped of its treasures. The relics were burned, the gold and silver objects were melted down to make coins and the building itself became a warehouse, prison and barracks. All that now remains of the abbey is the church of St. Victor, dedicated by Pope Benedict IX in 1040 and rebuilt in 1200. The abbey was again used for worship under the First Empire and restored in the 19th century. The church was made into a minor basilica in 1934 by Pope Pius XI.

The remains of Saint John Cassian were formerly in the crypt, along with those of Saints Maurice, Marcellinus and Peter, the body of one of the Holy Innocents, and Bishop Saint Maurontius. The abbey crypt previously held Cassian's remains, along with were previously interred in the abbey crypt, along with the remains of Saints Maurice, Marcellinus, Peter, also has it that it contains the relics of the eponymous martyr of Marseille from the 4th century.

== See also ==
- Santa Maria, Uta, a church founded by St. Victor's monks.

== Further readings ==
- M. Fixot, J.-P. Pelletier, Saint-Victor de Marseille - Étude archéologique et monumentale, Turnhout, 2009, ISBN 978-2-503-53257-8, 344 p., paperback.
