= San Salvatore a Camaldoli =

Coordinates: 43°46′04.87″N 11°14′25.05″E

San Salvatore a Camaldoli is a Renaissance-style, former Roman Catholic church and convent located in front of Piazza Tasso, in the quartiere of Oltrarno, Florence, region of Tuscany, Italy.

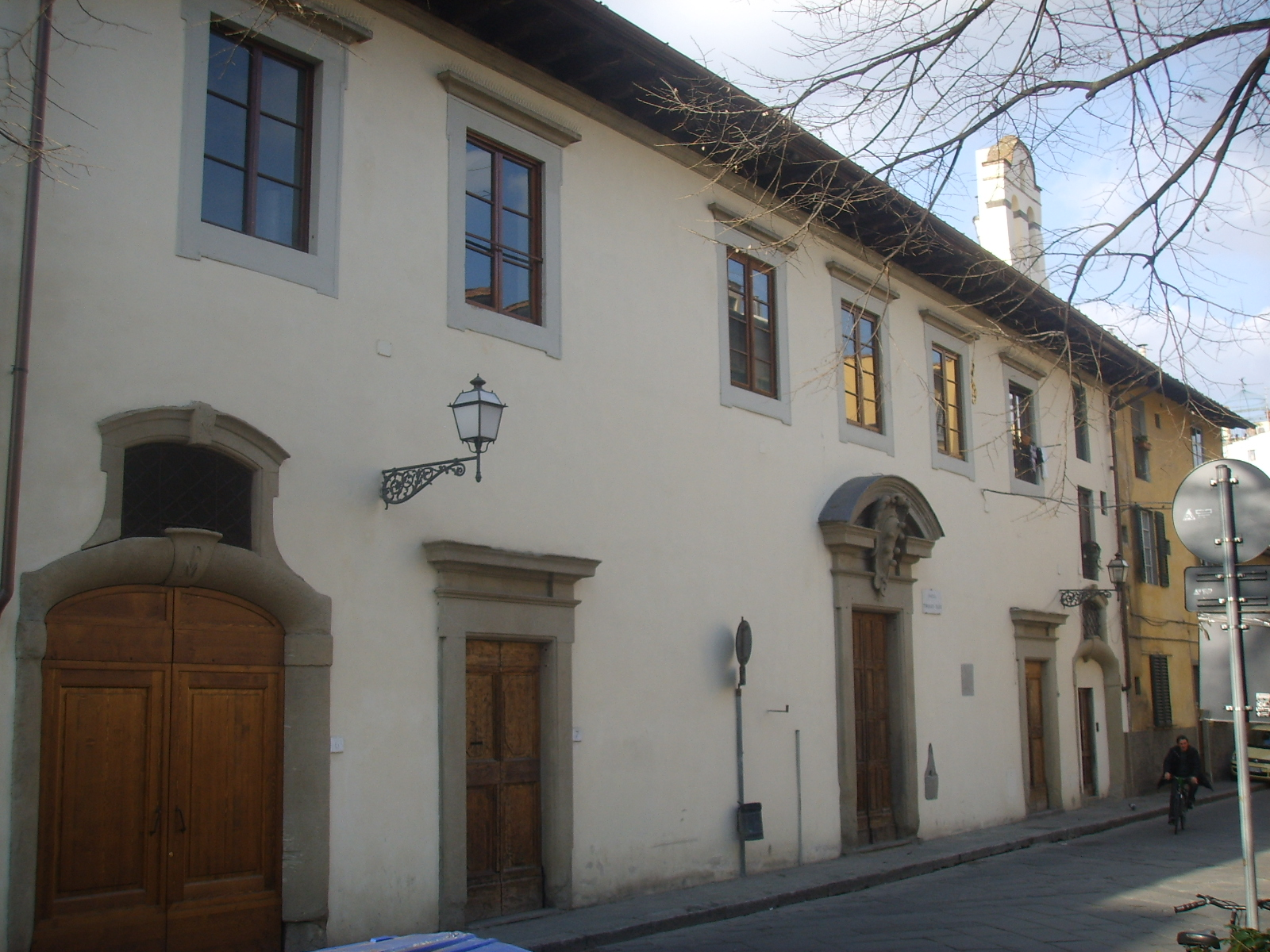
Former Church and convent of San Salvatore a Camaldoli.

== History ==
A church at the site, dedicated to the San Salvador (Holy Savior) was present by the 11th century. In 1102, the abbot of the Camaldolese order founded a monastery. The monastery was abandoned during the Siege of Florence (1529–30).

The site became a hospice for beggars and the indigent, and starting in 1621, it was refurbished under the direction of Giulio Parigi. In the eighteenth century the convent housed a Leopoldine School and a conservatory for girls under the supervision of the Order of the Visitation of Holy Mary.
