= Piazza Tasso, Florence =

City square

Coordinates: 43°46′2.46″N 11°14′26.24″E

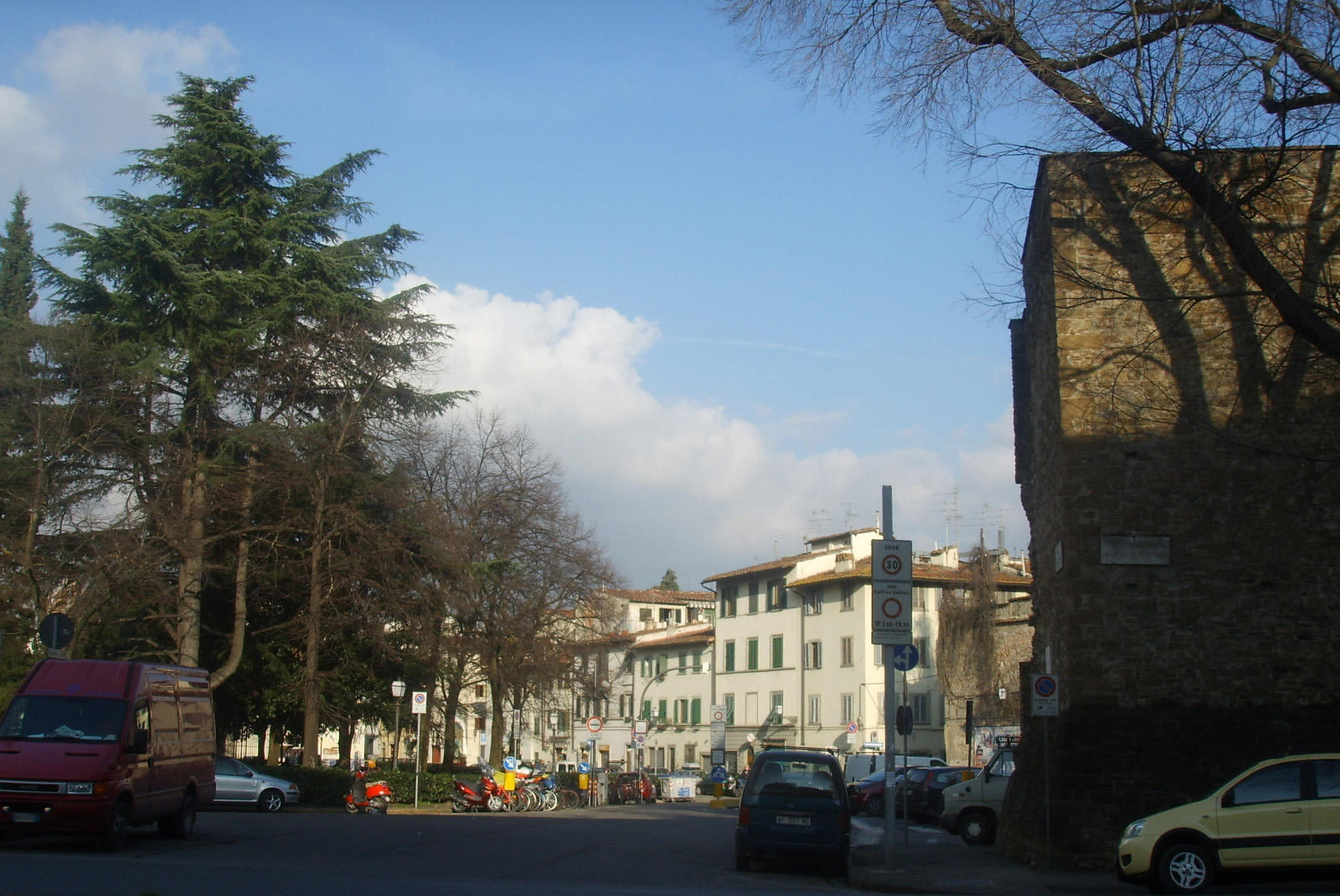
Piazza Tasso

Piazza Tasso is a city square in Oltrarno, Florence, Italy.

== Buildings around the square ==
- Walls of Florence
- Church and convent of San Salvatore a Camaldoli
