= Architecture of Sardinia =

The architecture of Sardinia reflects the history of the island and the cultures that have inhabited it since its first-known constructions in 4000 B.C. An especially distinctive element of Sardinian architecture is the presence of Nuraghes and other buildings constructed by the Nuragic civilization.

== From prehistory to the Byzantine Era ==
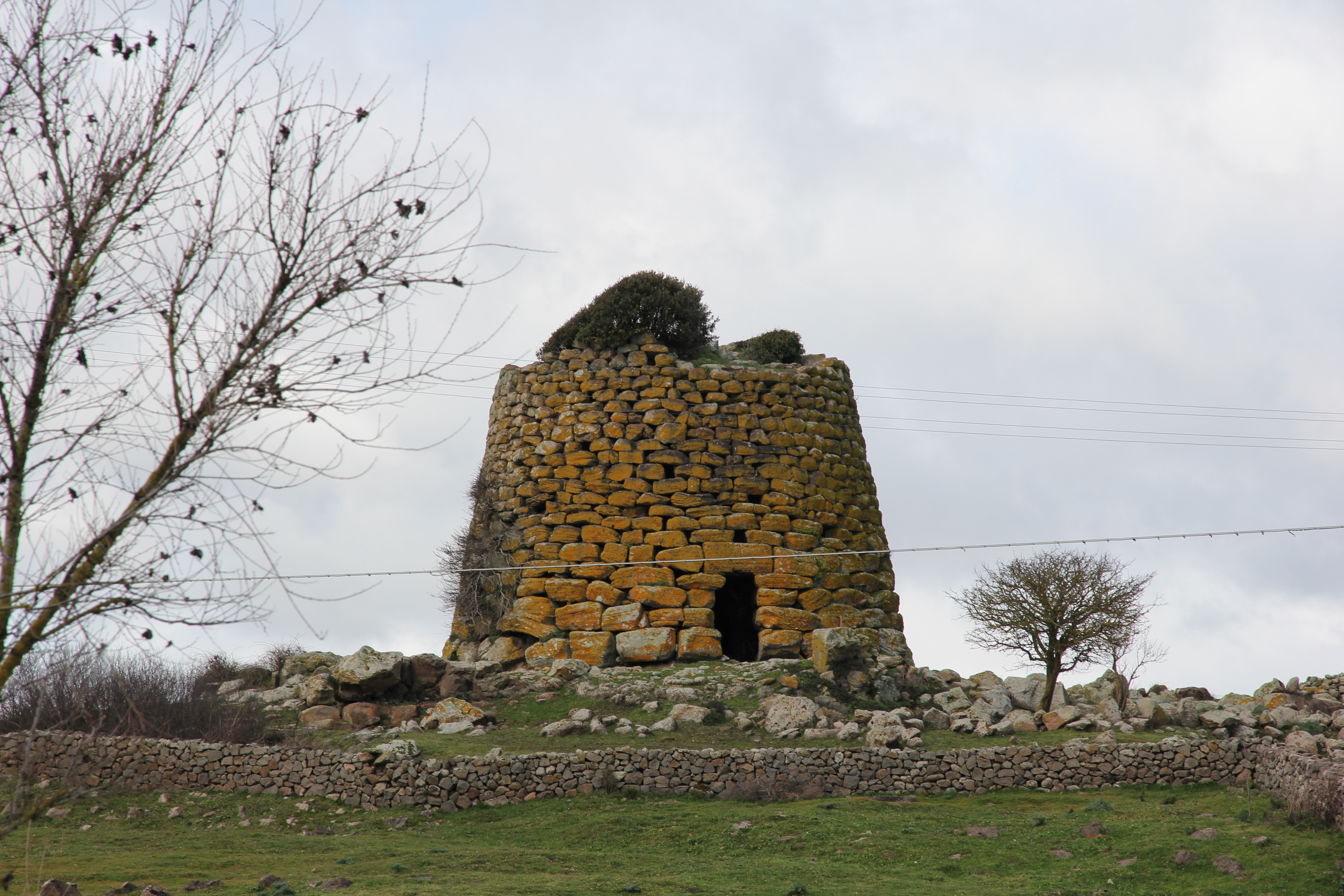
Nuraghe Succoronis, Macomer

Sardinia preserves many prehistoric and protohistoric constructions including underground tombs called Domus de Janas (Sardinian: House of the Fairies or House of the Witches), stone circles, dolmen, and menhir, which first appeared on the island at the time of the Ozieri. Monte d'Accoddi, an archeological site thought once to function as an altar, was also built during the time of the Ozieri.

However, the constructions of the Nuragic civilization, particularly the Nuraghes, are most characteristic of early Sardinian architecture. Nuraghes are varied types of circular stone towers (corridor, single tower, tancato, polylobed) typically built in the form of a truncated cone. Around 7,000 Nuraghes still dot the island, but archaeologists believe there may have been as many as 10,000 at one time. Other Nuragic-age constructions which can be found throughout Sardinia are megalithic gallery graves known as giants' graves, megaron temples such as the Domu de Orgia, and holy wells for the worship of water. In addition, it is estimated that there are about 500 Nuragic villages, generally fortified, with the most important and significant examples being Su Nuraxi in Barumini, Santu Antine in Torralba, Seruci at Gonnesa, and Losa near Abbasanta.

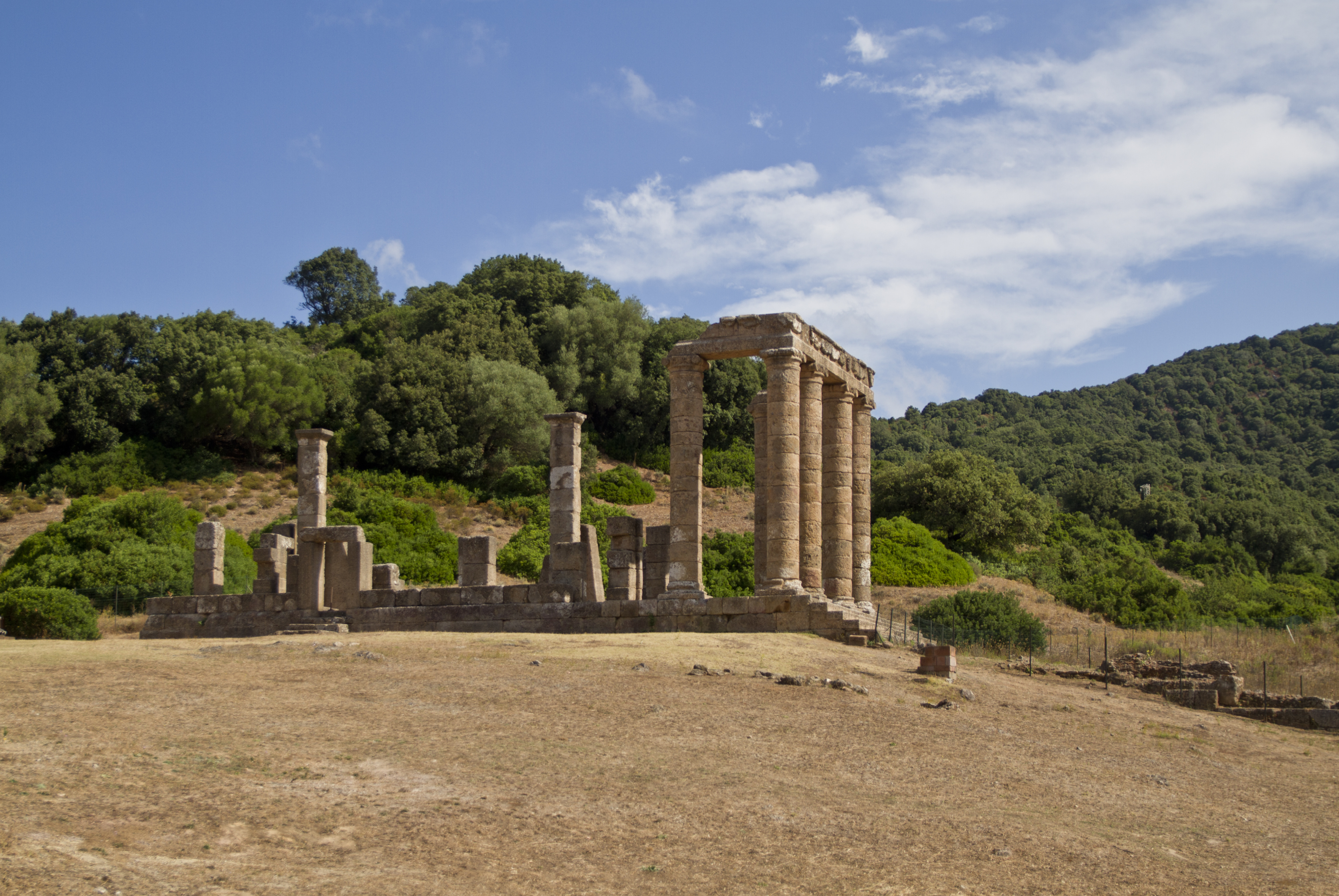
Temple of Antas

Around 500 B.C., the Punics built the Temple of Antas which was dedicated to the worship of the important Sardinian figure, Sid Addir. However, the original temple is no longer visible, as Augustus built a Roman temple on top of the original site. The Punics also contributed to the architecture of Sardinia during this period by constructing necropolises, such as the necropolis of Tuvixeddu, and tophet, which may have served as places of child burial or sacrifice; they also built new cities and fortifications.

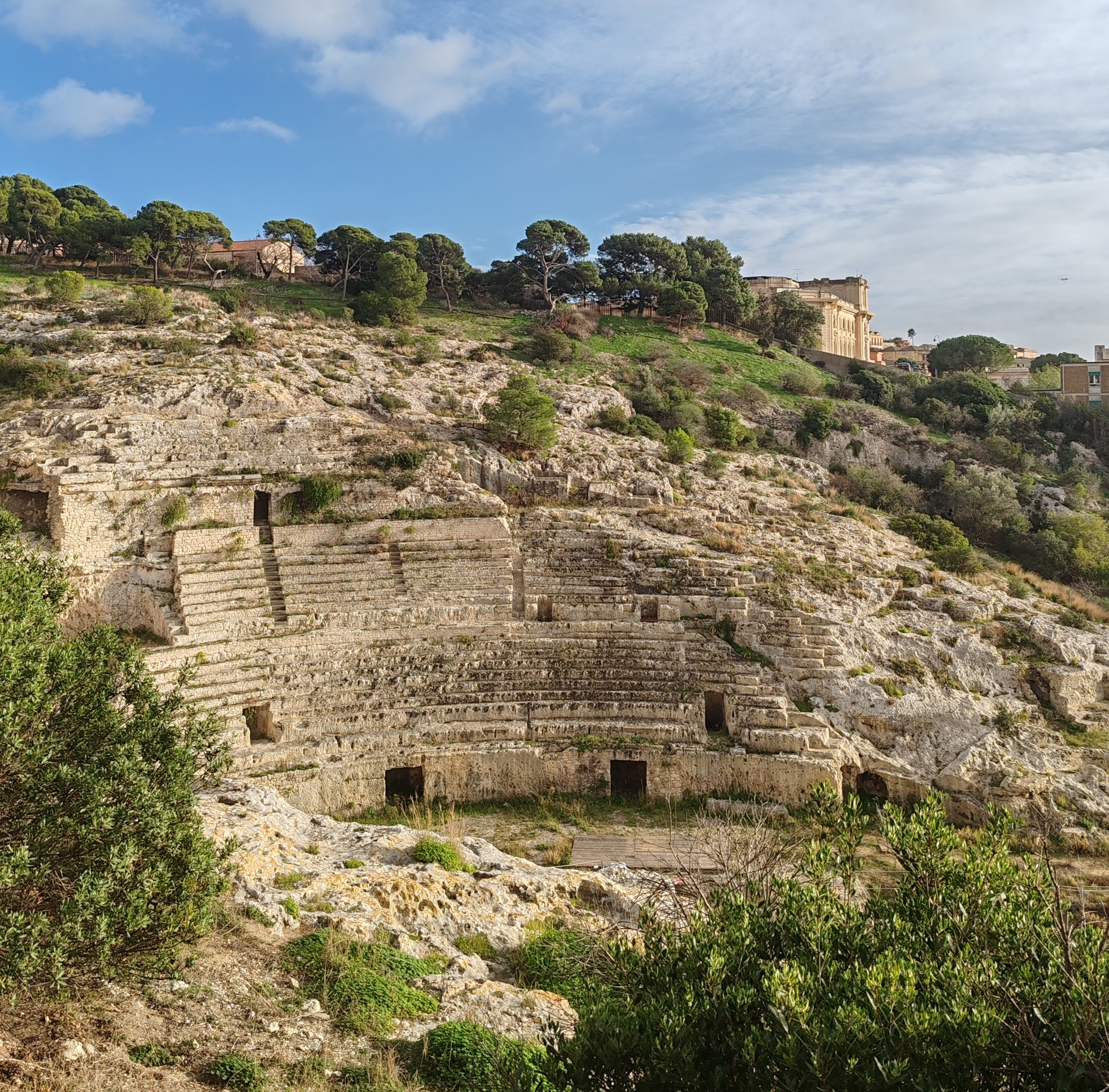
Roman amphitheater of Cagliari

During the Roman period, roads were constructed across the island, cities were restructured, and new settlements were built. Many Roman-era buildings and infrastructure still survive to this day such as aqueducts, baths, a theater, and the amphitheater of Cagliari.

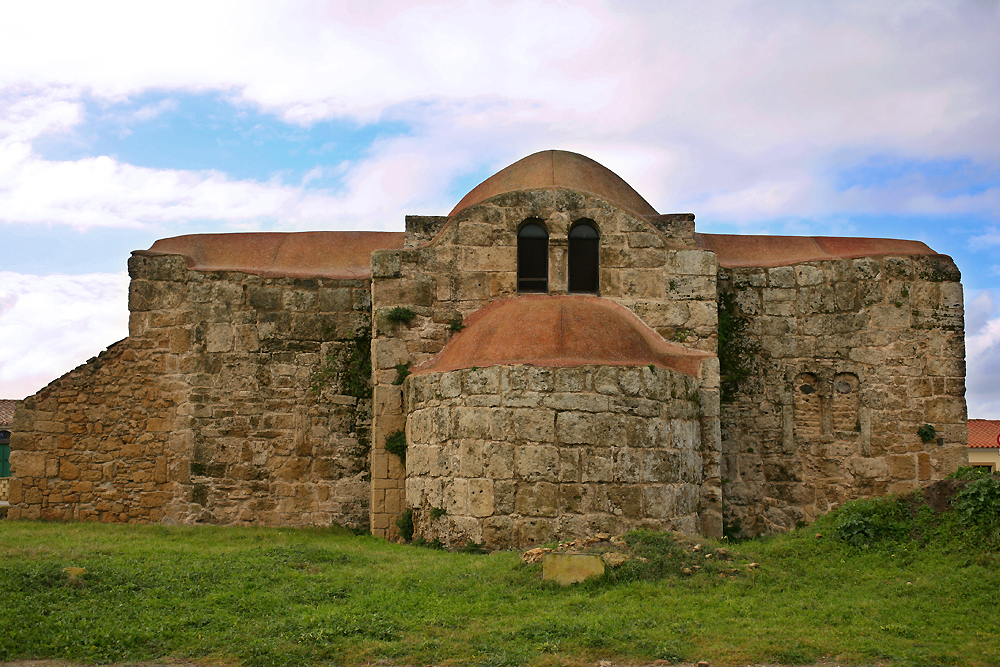
San Giovanni of Sinis

There are also several examples of Early Christian and Byzantine architecture throughout the territory both on the coasts and inland. The basilicas of San Saturnino, Sant'Antioco, Columbaris, and San Giovanni di Sinis date back to the fifth or sixth century C.E. Some architectural works during this time are notable for their underground construction such as the necropolis of Sant'Andrea Priu which repurposed a pre-existing complex of Domus de Janas chambers.

== Judicates period ==
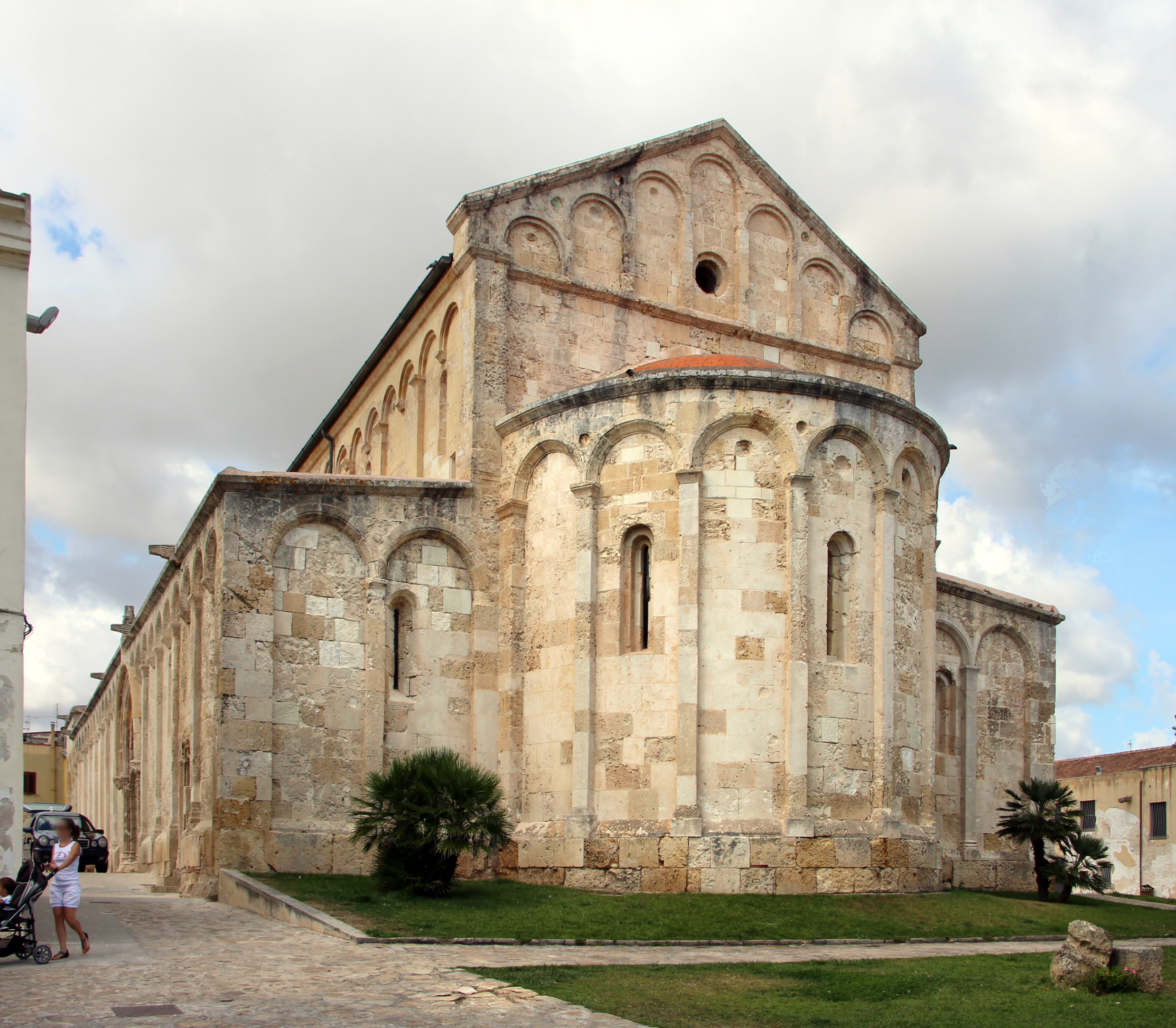
Basilica of San Gavino

During the Judicates period, thanks to the security of the Mediterranean guaranteed by the fleets of the Italian maritime republics of Pisa and Genoa, as well as the flourishing of commercial activities, Romanesque architecture spread in Sardinia. The first Romanesque building on the island was the Basilica of San Gavino in Porto Torres, in the Giudicato of Torres. Construction began during the reign of Judge Gonario I of Torres around 1015–1038; after Gonario's death, he was succeeded by his son Barisone I of Torres, who continued the construction of the basilica.

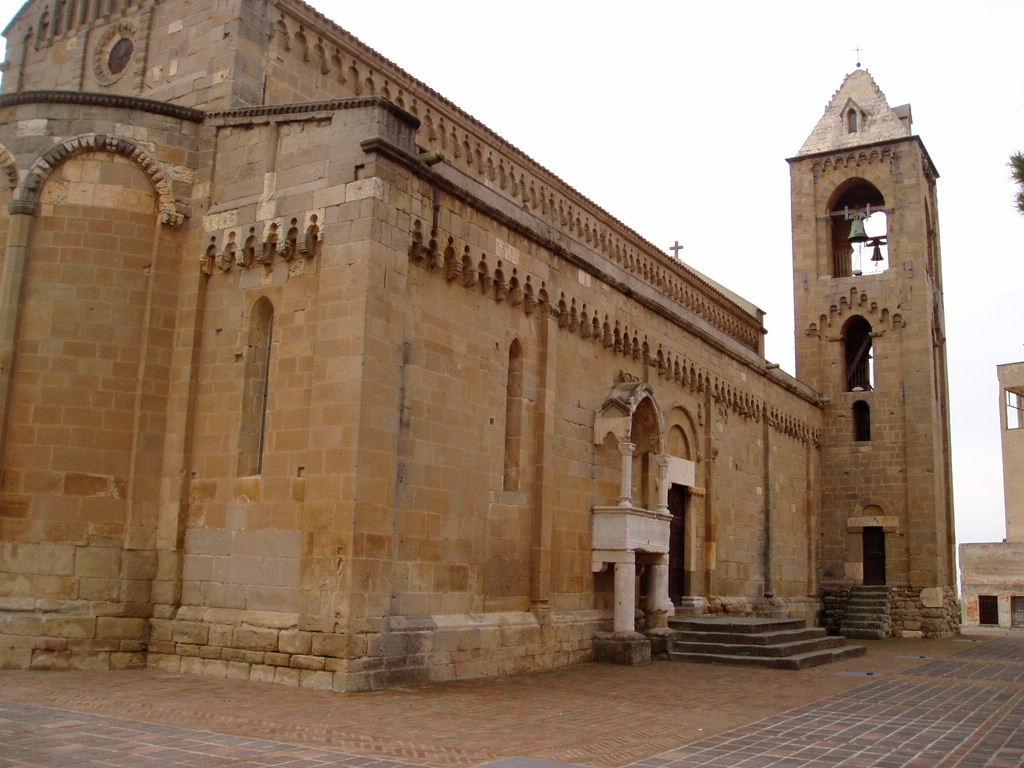
Dolianova Cathedral in Romanesque style with some concessions to Gothic, dating back to the last construction phase (end of the 13th century)

The rulers of the Judicates, from around 1063 onwards, facilitated the arrival of monks from various orders from different regions of the Italian Peninsula and France through substantial donations. These circumstances led to the presence of various skilled craftsmen in the island: Pisans, Lombards, Provençals, and even those with Arab influence from the Iberian Peninsula. This fusion of experiences gave rise to unique artistic expressions in the area.

In the mid-12th century, Sardinian Romanesque architecture became increasingly closely linked to that of Pisa which played a dominant role due to the greater involvement of Pisan families in the internal politics of the Judicates. The Basilica of Saccargia in Codrongianos is perhaps the most famous expression of Pisan Romanesque in Sardinia.

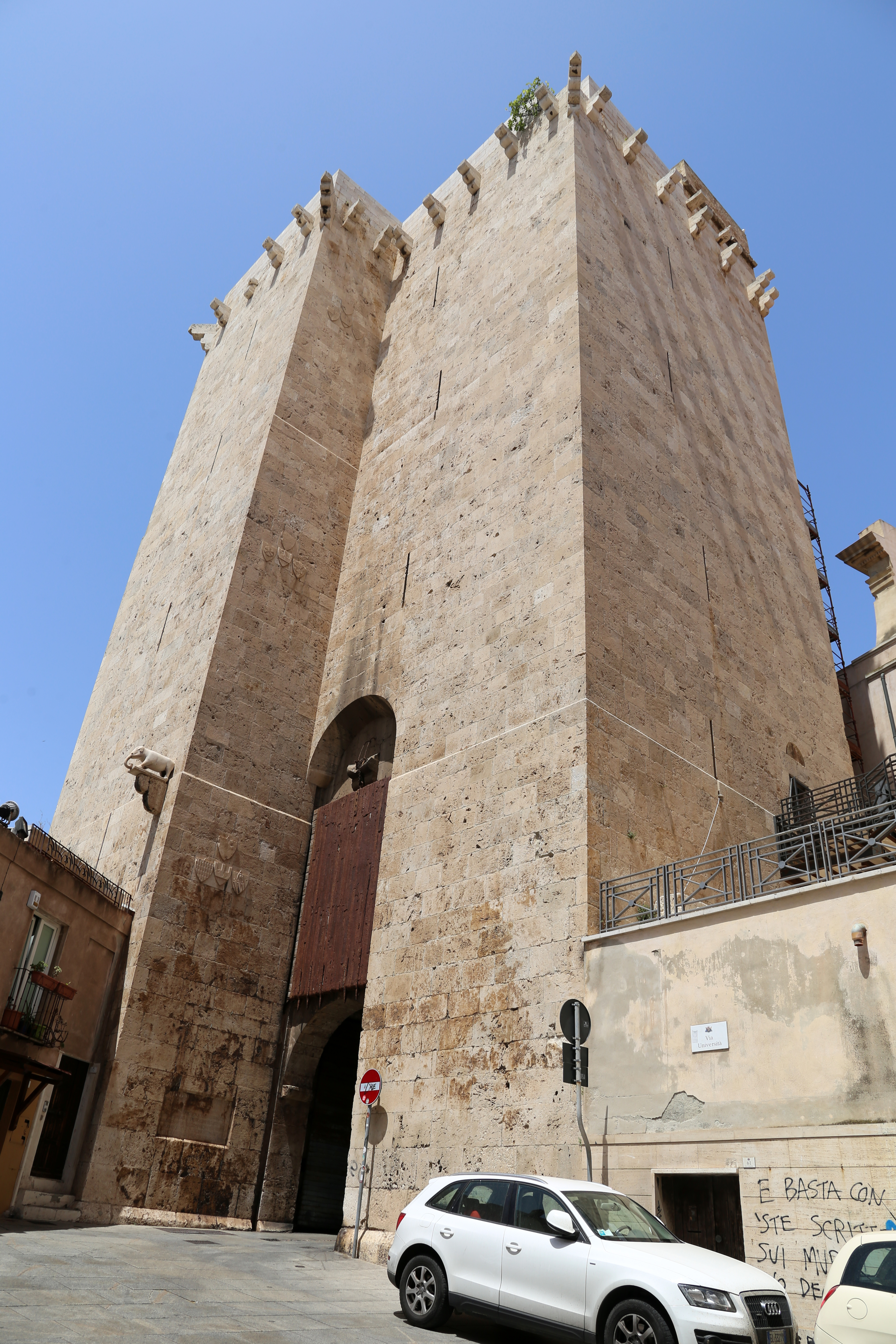
Elephant Tower

Apart from numerous churches, several examples of military architecture also remain from the medieval period. These include castles such as Acquafredda Castle, San Michele Castle, Sanluri Castle, and Serravalle Castle. The city walls of Sassari and Iglesias (partially spared from 19th-century demolitions) and towers like San Pancrazio Tower and the Elephant Tower in Cagliari (designed by Giovanni Capula) or the tower of Marianus II in Oristano, also remain.

== Gothic, Renaissance and Baroque ==
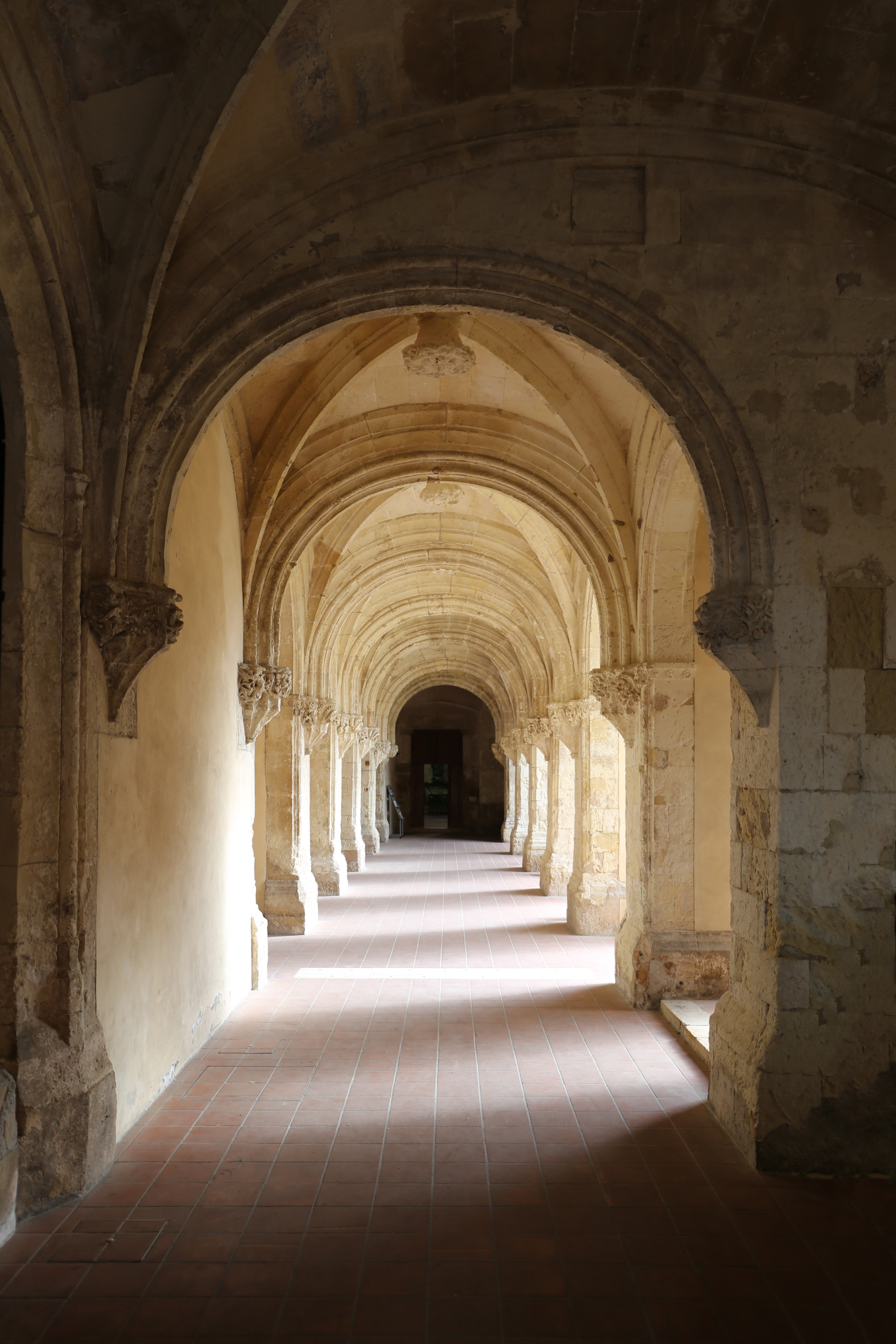
Cloister of San Domenico, Cagliari

Since the mid-13th century, the presence of the Franciscans led to the introduction of architectural and decorative types related to the Italian Gothic style in Sardinia. Among the most important buildings of this style is the Cathedral of Cagliari, which preserves significant parts of the transept. Later, the Aragonese introduced forms of Catalan Gothic architecture, with the Shrine of Our Lady of Bonaria being the first example.

Renaissance architecture, although sparsely represented, includes notable examples such as the layout of the Cathedral of San Nicola in Sassari (late Gothic but with a strong Renaissance influence), the church of Sant'Agostino in Cagliari (designed by Palearo Fratino), the church of Santa Caterina in Sassari (designed by Bernardoni, a student of Vignola), and the completion of the cathedral of Santa Maria in Alghero, which was the work of Jacopo Palearo Fratino.

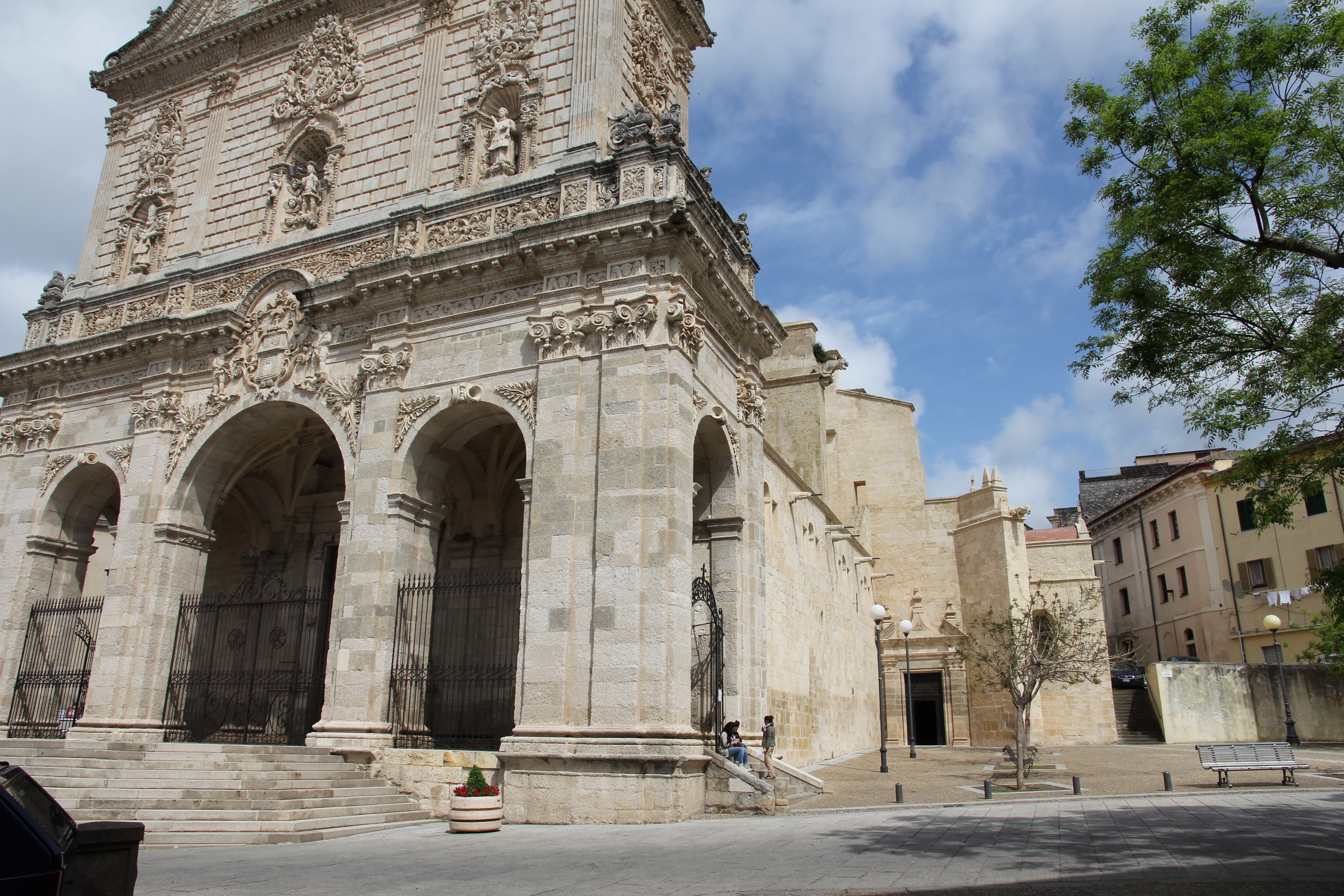
Cathedral of San Nicola

In contrast, Baroque architecture has been widely highlighted as well. Interesting examples include the Collegiate Church of Sant'Anna in Cagliari, the facade of the Cathedral of San Nicola in Sassari (the work of Romero and Corbellini), the church of San Michele in Cagliari (with a central plan and valuable stuccos and frescoes), as well as the cathedrals of Cagliari, Ales, and Oristano, which were rebuilt between the 17th and 18th centuries, respectively, by Domenico Spotorno and Giovanni Battista Arieti.

In the second half of the 16th century—during the Spanish era—the fortresses of Cagliari, Alghero, and Castellaragonese (Castelsardo) were strengthened and modernized. This period also saw the construction of coastal towers along the entire Sardinian coast which served an anti-Barbary function. Almost all of these towers have a circular plan.

== 19th century ==
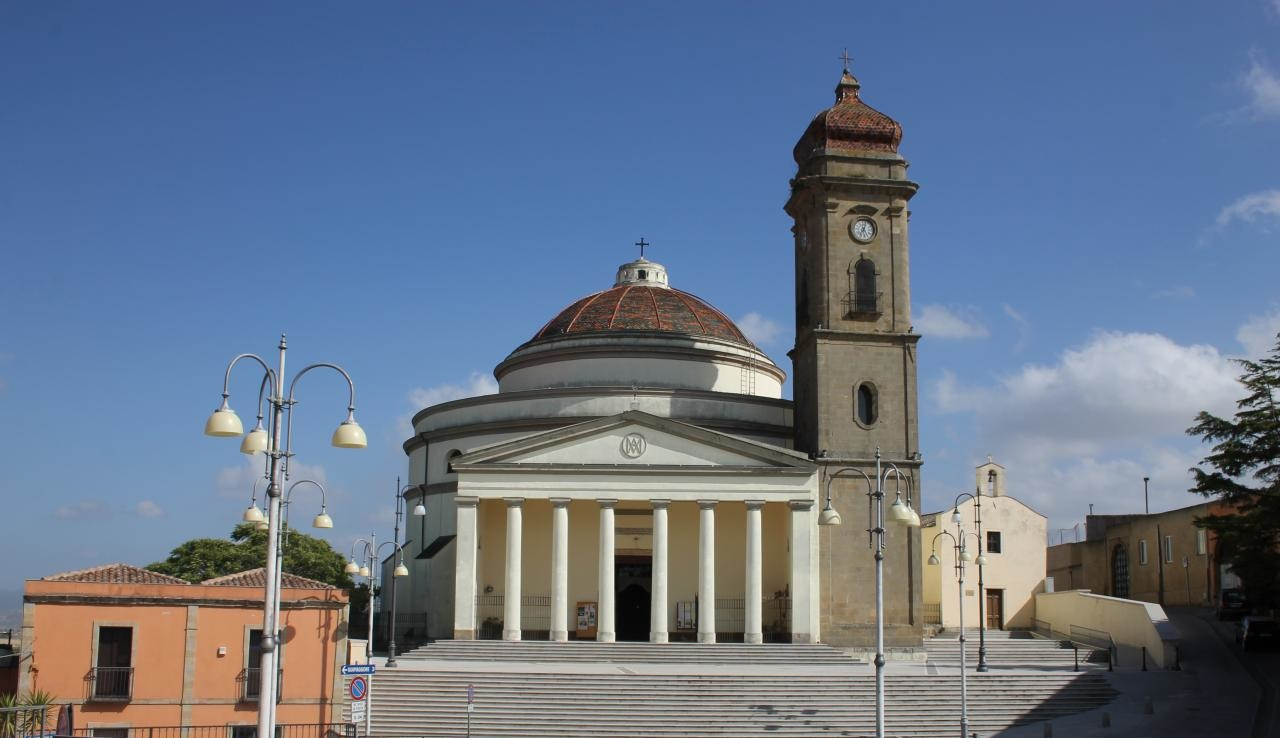
Sanctuary of the Blessed Virgin Assumed

Starting from the 19th century, thanks to new ideas and experiences imported by some Sardinian architects trained in Turin, new neoclassical architectural forms spread throughout the island. Among the most important figures of this architectural and urban phase is the architect from Cagliari, Gaetano Cima, whose works are scattered throughout the Sardinian territory. Among his many achievements are the civil hospital of Cagliari, the Sanctuary of the Blessed Virgin Assumed in Guasila, and the cathedral of Ozieri. Alongside Cima's works, those of Cominotti (Palace and Civic Theater of Sassari) and Cano (Dome of S. Maria di Betlem in Sassari and the Cathedral of Our Lady of the Snows in Nuoro) are also noteworthy.

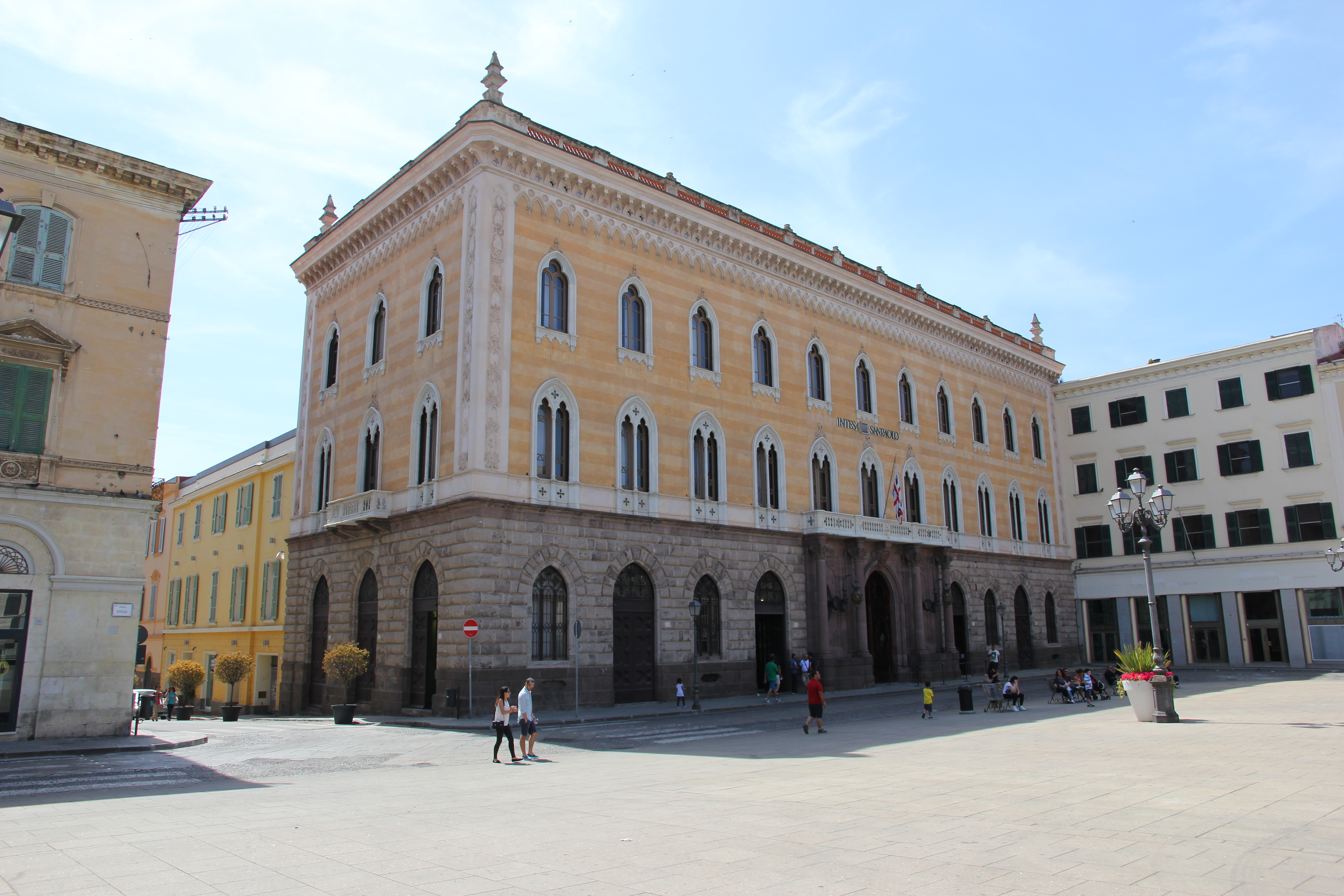
Palazzo Giordano

In the second half of the 19th century, in Sassari, the Neo-Gothic Giordano Palace was built in 1878, representing one of the first examples of revivalism on the island, while the neo-Romanesque facade of the Cathedral of Cagliari—the work of Giarrizzo—dates back to 1933.

== From the 20th century onwards ==
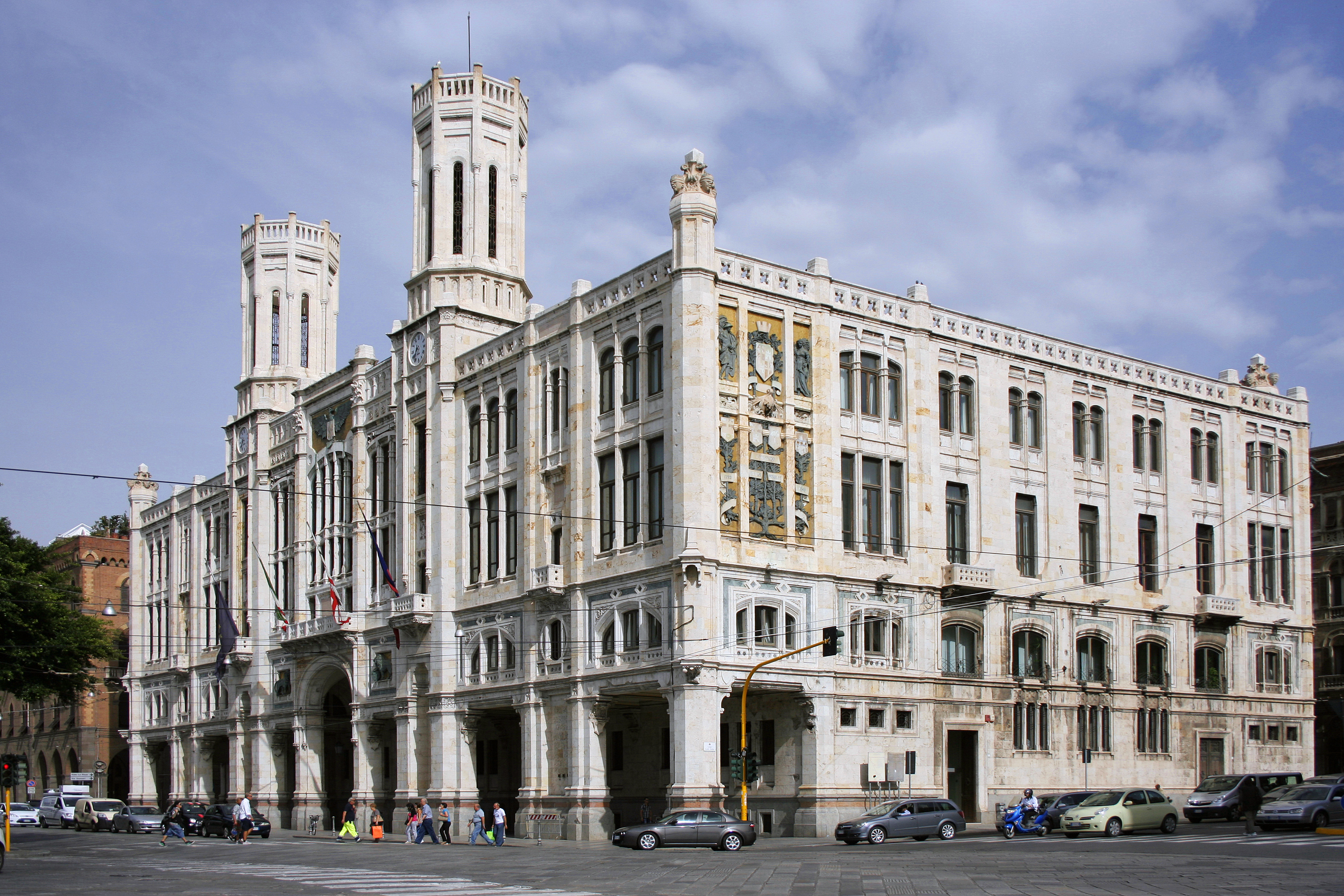
Cagliari city hall

An interesting example of eclectic taste, derived from the combination of inspirations from revivalist and Art Nouveau models, is the Civic Palace of Cagliari, which was completed in the early years of the 20th century. Art Nouveau and Art Déco found their place especially in the new palaces of the upper-middle-class families, as well as in public buildings.

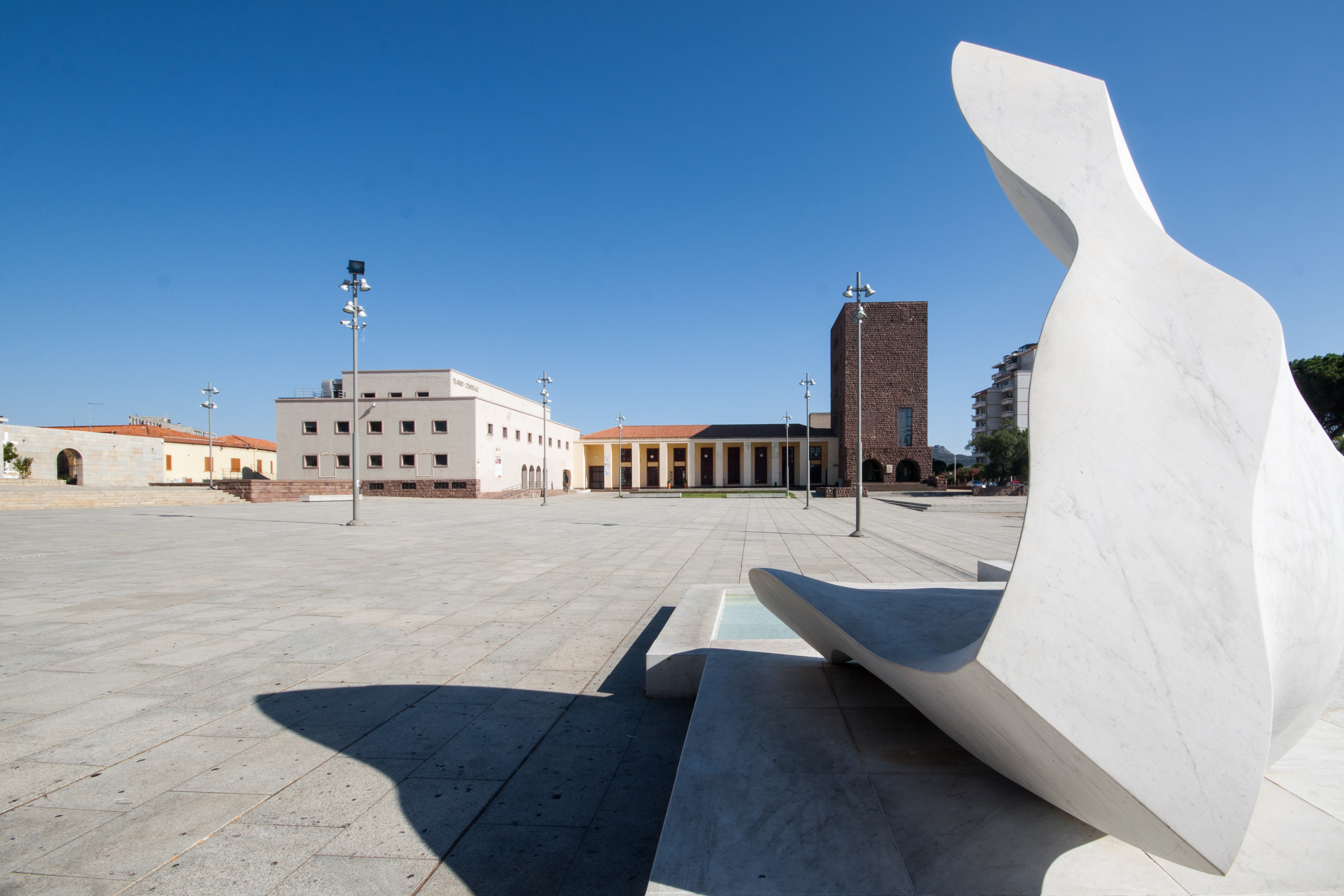
Carbonia

Later, the advent of fascism had a strong influence on Italian architecture in the twenties and thirties. Also, in Sardinia, particularly in newly founded cities, several constructions of the rationalist and monumental styles were realized: notable achievements of that period were the centers of Fertilia, Arborea, and the city of Carbonia—one of the greatest examples of rationalist architecture. A prominent figure of the time is Ubaldo Badas, the author of numerous buildings in Cagliari and elsewhere.

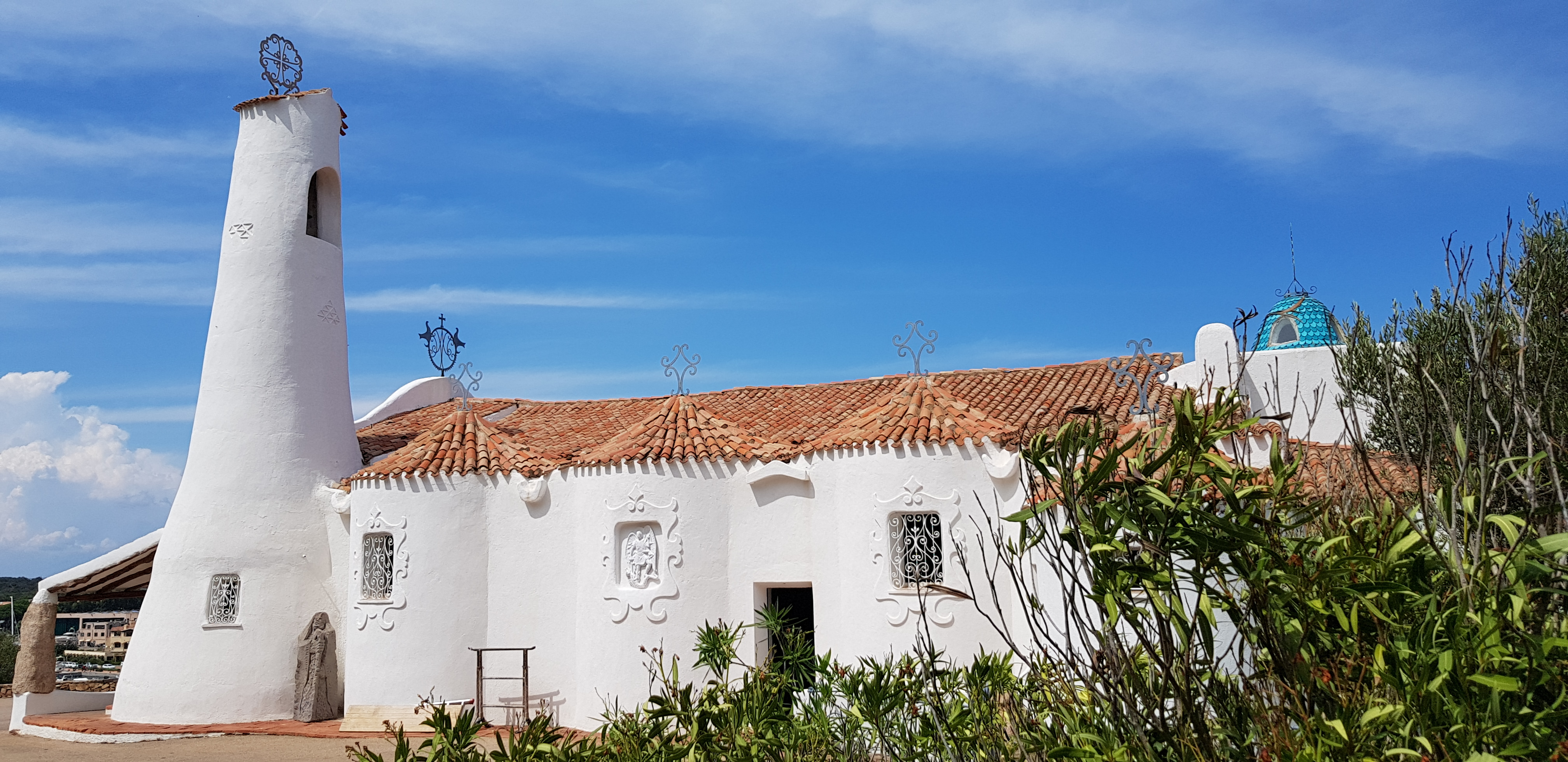
Stella Maris church by Busiri Vici

The tourist development that began in the sixties led to the construction of architecturally significant buildings in Costa Smeralda, such as Cala di Volpe, Romazzino, or Pitrizza, along with the village of Porto Cervo with the Stella Maris church—works, respectively, by Jacques Couelle, Luigi Vietti, and Michele Busiri Vici.

More recent are other decidedly modern buildings like the tower of the T Hotel or the headquarters of the Banca di Credito Sardo, both in Cagliari. The latter was done by Renzo Piano.

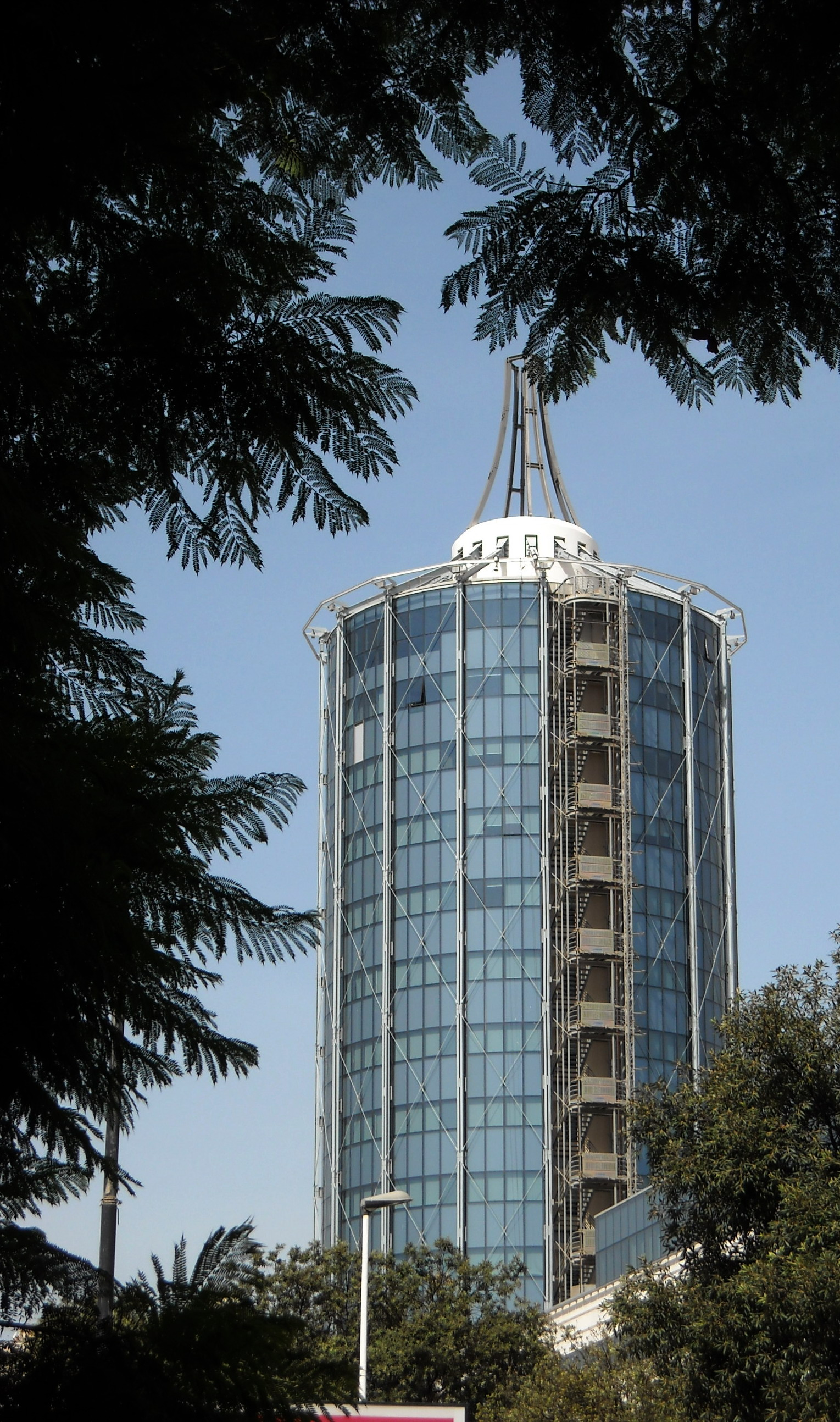
T Hotel tower

The tallest buildings constructed on the island are the Nuovo skyscraper of Sassari by Fernando Clemente, with 80 meters and 19 floors plus eight meters of antenna (88 meters total), the T Hotel in Cagliari with 62 meters (73 meters including the flagpole) and 16 floors, the west tower of the so-called Palazzaccio of Olbia with 50 meters and 16 floors, and the dome of the Basilica of Bonaria in Cagliari with 50 meters. The tallest structure ever built is the approximately 250-meter chimney of the Sulcis Power Plant (belonging to Enel Produzione) located within the Portovesme Industrial Pole.

== Traditional residential architectures ==
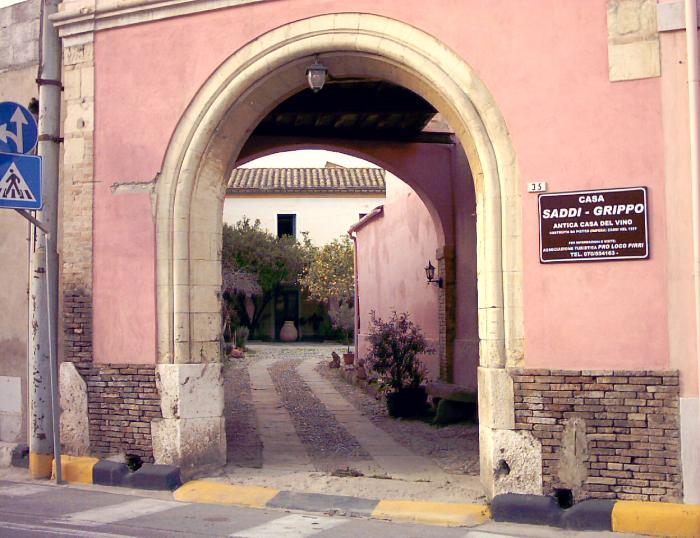
Campidanese house

Additionally, there are various traditional types of housing, such as the tall houses in hilly and mountainous areas, built with stone and wood; the courtyard houses, built with ladiri bricks, of the Campidano; and different types of settlements, like the stazzi in Gallura and the furriadroxius and the medaus in the Sulcis-Iglesiente region.

== See also ==
- History of Sardinia
- Architecture of Italy

== Bibliography ==
- Dionigi, Scano (1929). Chiese medievali di Sardegna [Medieval churches of Sardinia] (in Italian). Firenze: Cagliari – via Wikisource. (ristampa anastatica, Cagliari, 1991)
- Delogu, Raffaello (1953). L'architettura del medioevo in Sardegna. Sassari: Carlo Delfino., in formato PDF: .
- Barrecca, Ferruccio (1974). La Sardegna fenicia e punica. Chiarella. [ISBN unspecified].
- Renata, Serra (1988). Sardegna Romanica. Milano: Jaca Book. ISBN 88-16-60096-9.
- Salvatore Naitza, Architettura dal tardo '600 al classicismo purista, Nuoro, Ilisso, 1992 ISBN 88-85098-20-7
- Coroneo, Roberto (1993). Architettura romanica dalla metà del mille al primo '300. Ilisso. ISBN 88-85098-24-X.
- Francesca Segni Pulvirenti, Aldo Sari, Architettura tardogotica e d'influsso rinascimentale, Nuoro, Ilisso, 1994. ISBN 88-85098-31-2
- Masala, Franco (2001). Architettura in Sardegna dall'unità d'Italia alla fine del Novecento. Nuoro: Ilisso.
- Lilliu, Giovanni (2004). La civiltà dei Sardi: dal neolitico all'età dei nuraghi. Il Maestrale.
- Marco Lucchini, L'identità molteplice. Architettura moderna e contemporanea in Sardegna. 1930–2008, Cagliari, Aisara, 2008, ISBN 88-6104-033-0
