= Tuvixeddu necropolis =

Archaeological site in Cagliari, Italy

Necropolis of Tuvixeddu
- Necropoli di Tuvixeddu (Italian); Necròpolis de Tuvixeddu (Sardinian)
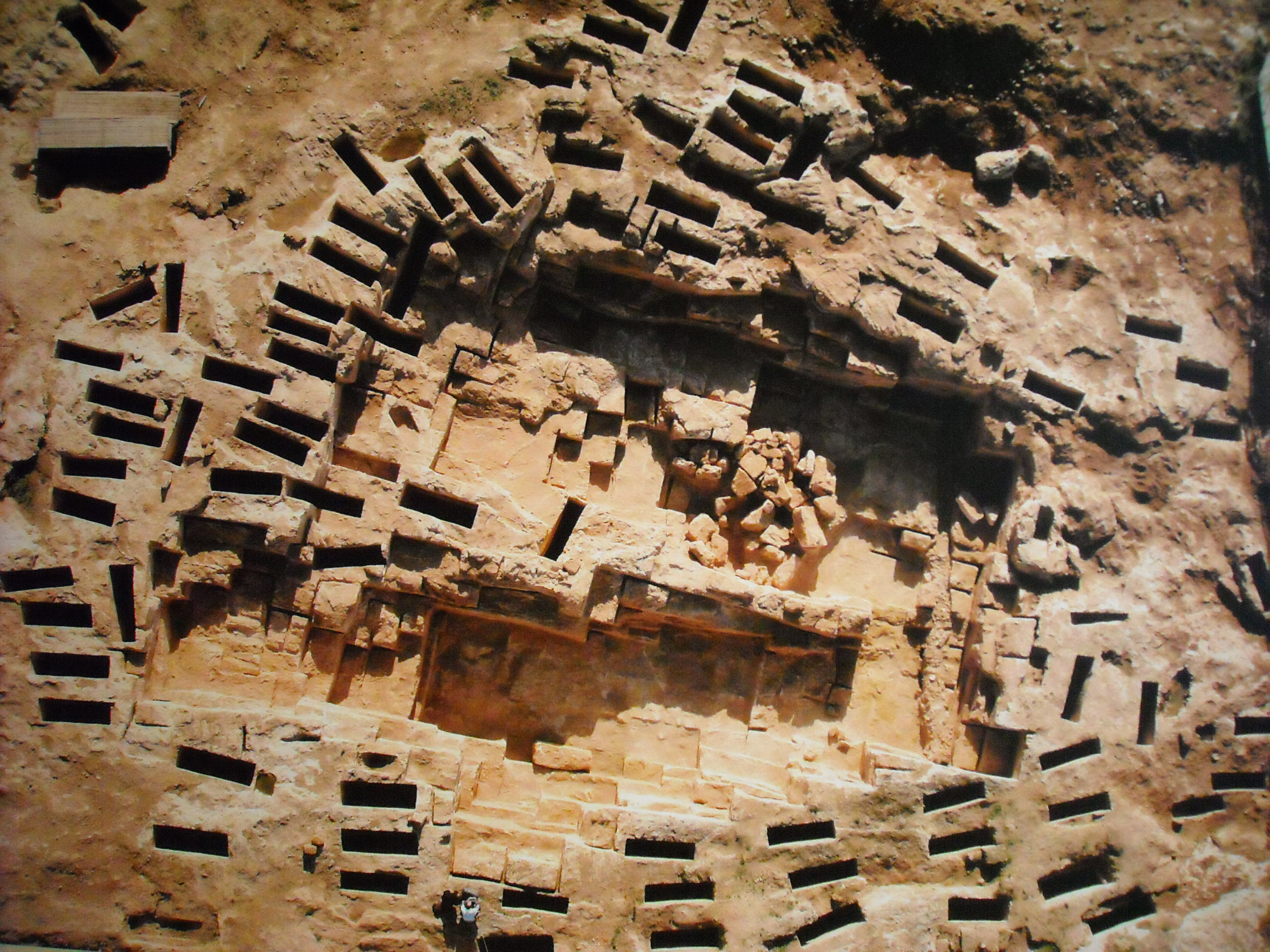

- Location within Italy
- 39°13′44″N 9°6′04″E
- Type: Necropolis
- Cultures: Punic, Roman
- Location: Cagliari, Sardinia, Italy
- Region: Sardinia

History
- Built: 6th century BC

Site notes
- Management: Superintendence for the Archaeological Heritage in the Provinces of Cagliari and Oristano (Soprintendenza per i Beni Archeologici per le province di Cagliari e Oristano)
- Public access: Yes

The necropolis of Tuvixeddu (pronounced [tuviˈʒeɖːu]) is a Punic necropolis, the largest in the Mediterranean. It is located in a hill inside the city of Cagliari, Sardinia called Tuvixeddu (meaning "little cavity" in Sardinian).

== History ==
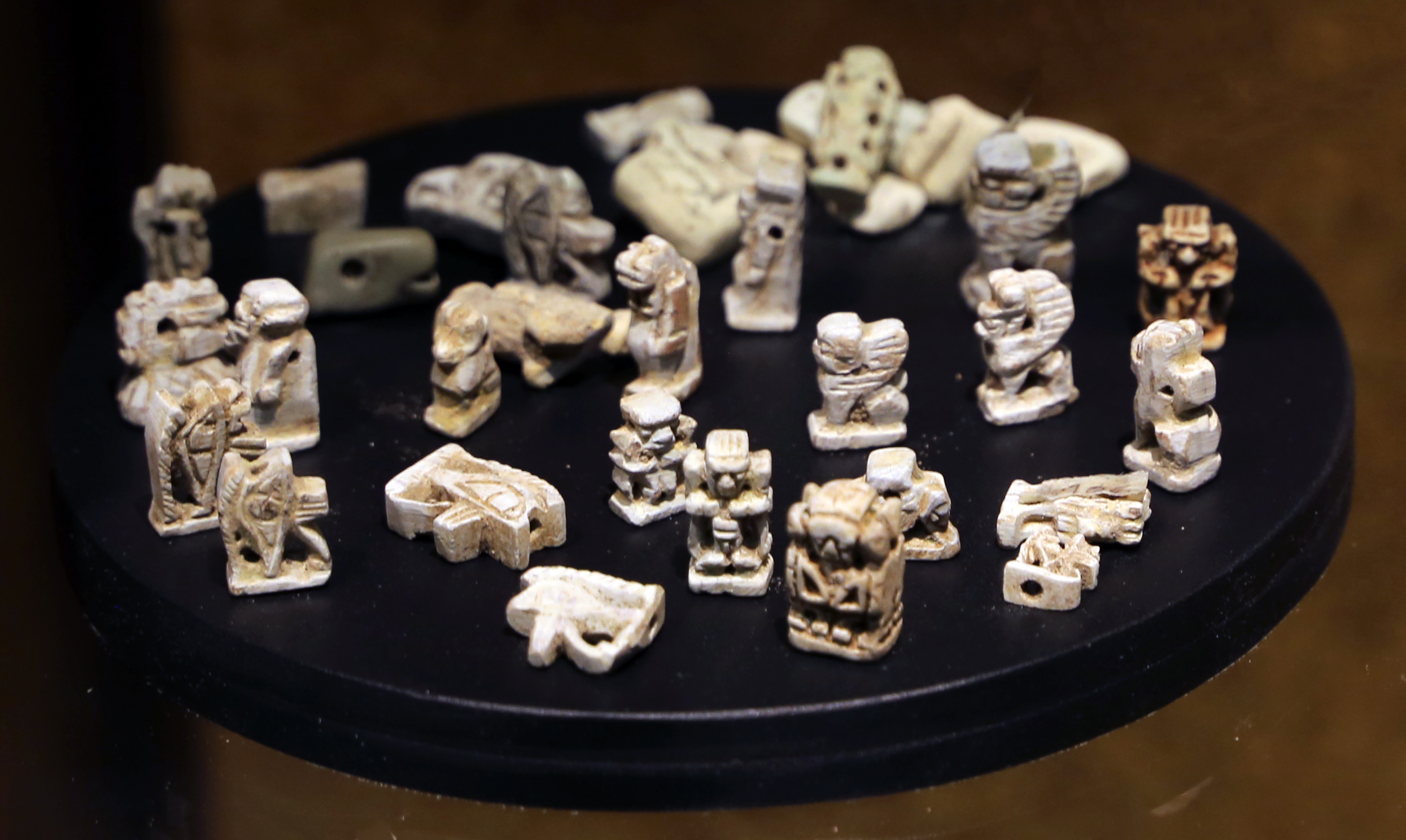
Amulets from Tuvixeddu, National Archaeological Museum, Cagliari

Between the 6th and 3rd centuries BC, the Carthaginians chose this hill to bury their dead: these burials were reached through a well dug into the limestone rock (from two to eleven meters deep), a small opening introduced to the burial chamber. The burial chambers were beautifully decorated; there were found amphorae and ampoules for the essences. Of particular interest among the Punic tombs, the "Uraeus Tomb" and the "Fighter Tomb", decorated with paintings of palm trees and masks, still well preserved. Another famous tomb is that "of the Wheel".

On the slopes of the Tuvixeddu hill there is a Roman necropolis, which overlooked the road at the exit of the city. The Roman necropolis consists mainly of arcosolium tombs and columbaria.

The necropolis opened to the public in May 2014, during the XVIII edition of Monumenti Aperti. The archaeological area is large, it originally consisted of an area of about 80 hectares (200 acres).

== Paleogenetics ==
A 2017 Ancient DNA study by Claudia Viganó et al. found that a man buried ~2000 years ago in the necropolis of Tuvixeddu carried the cod39 mutation that cause Beta thalassemia. The paternal and maternal haplogroups of this individual, suggests that he was likely autochthonous of Sardinia.

== Via Vittorio Veneto 40 cavity ==
This cavity is located a few metres from the artificial boundaries of Tuvixeddu, under the building that houses a high school. Until a few years ago, it was not visible because it was hidden by uninhabited and dilapidated blocks of flats, demolished for the final construction of the street. The Carthaginians used it as a water reservoir, as did the Romans later. During the WWII bombardments it offered shelter to the city's population, and after the war it was inhabited by the homeless.

== Gallery ==
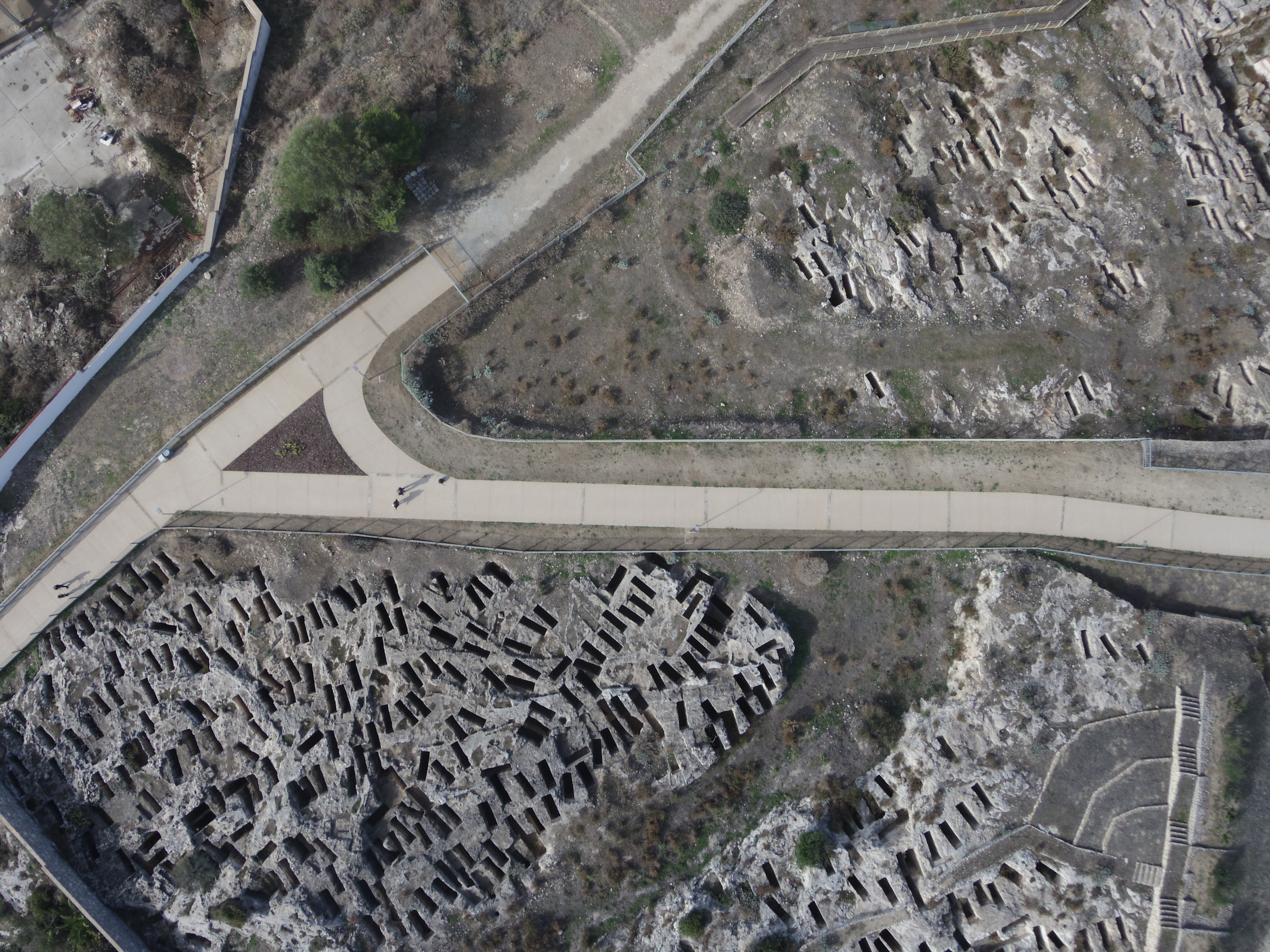
Aerial view of the site

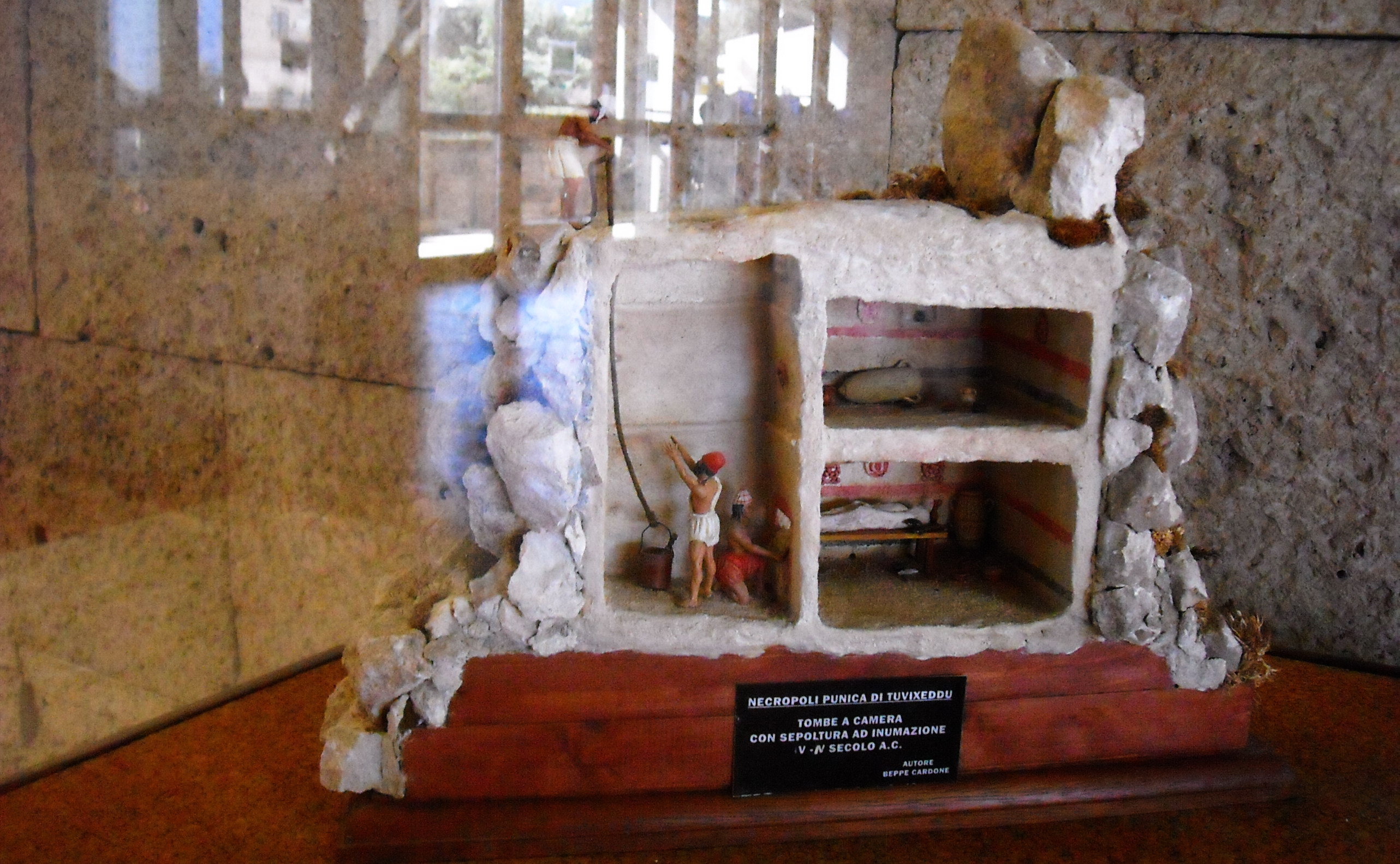
Reconstruction of a punic tomb of Tuvixeddu

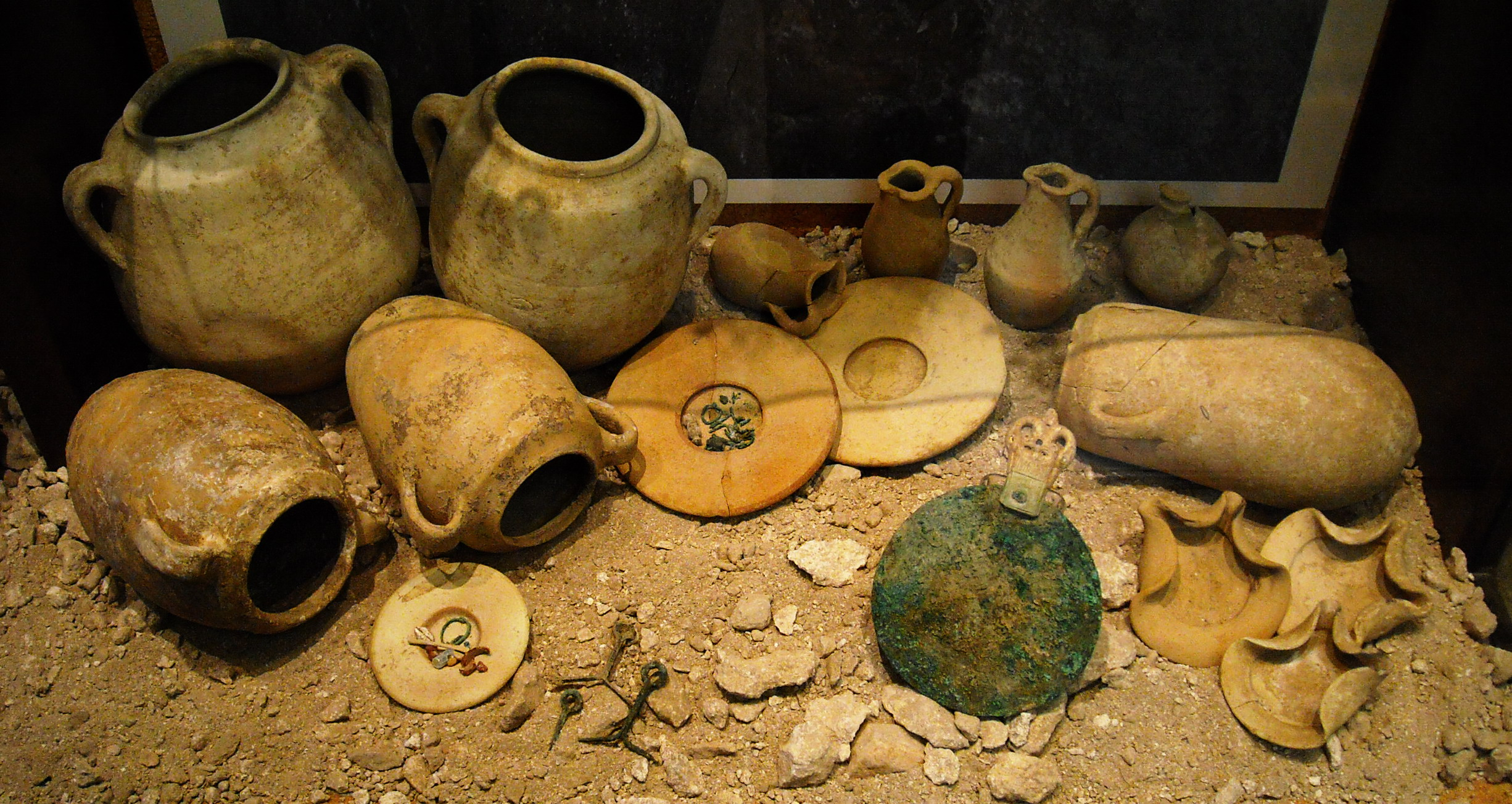
Grave goods

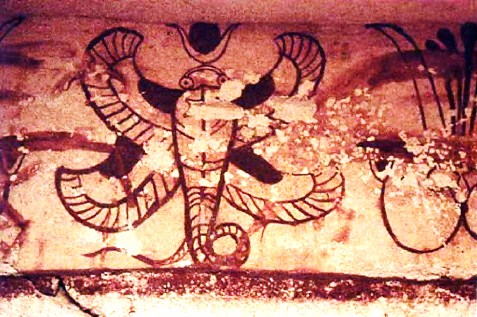
Decoration of the Ureaus tomb

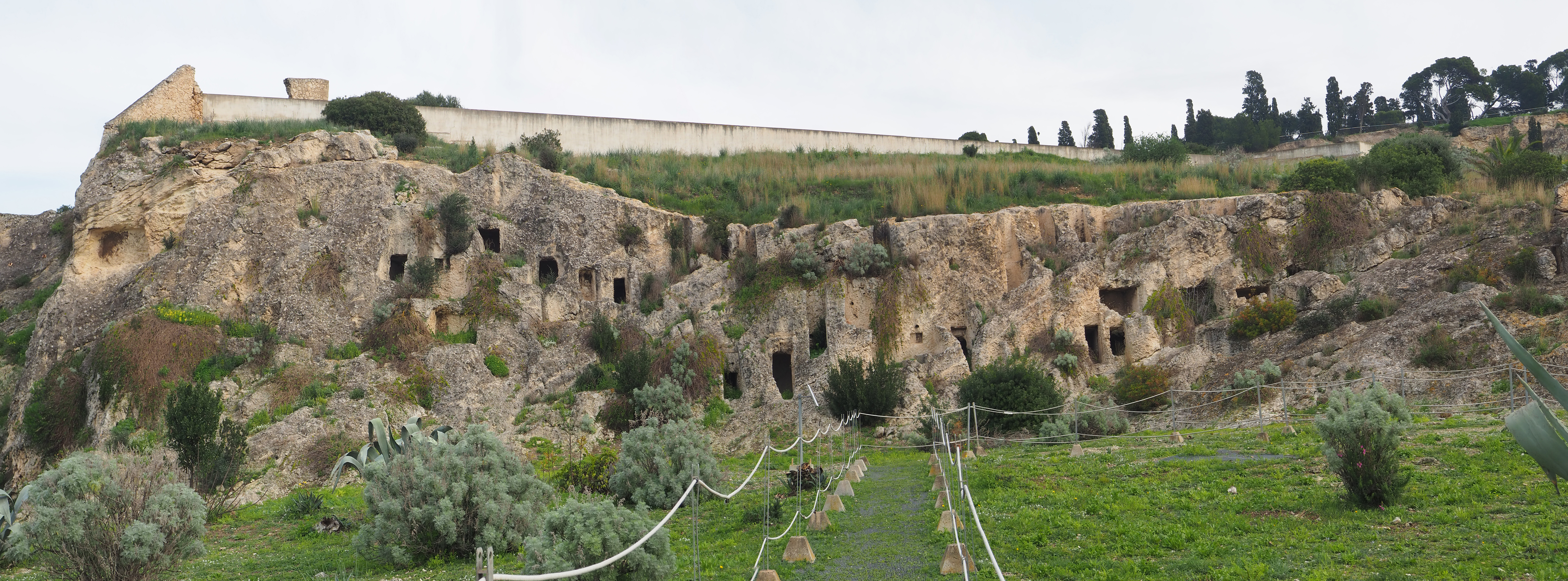

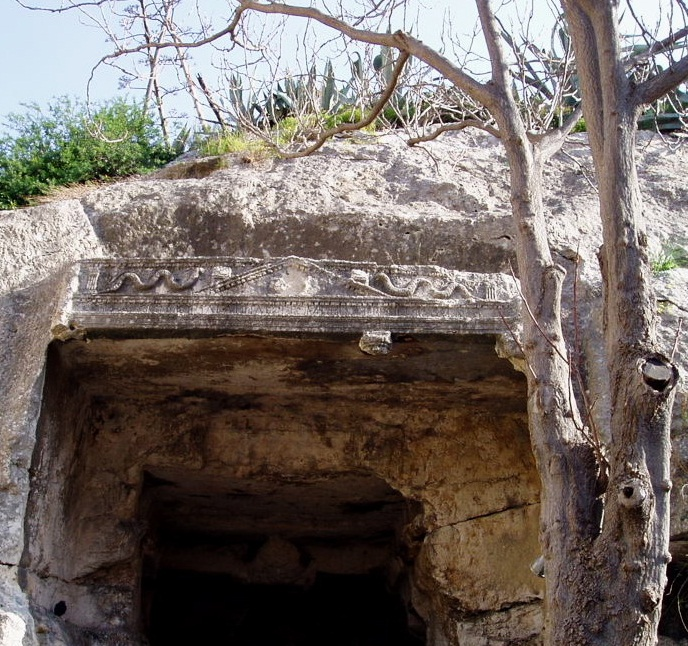
Roman tomb called Grotta della Vipera

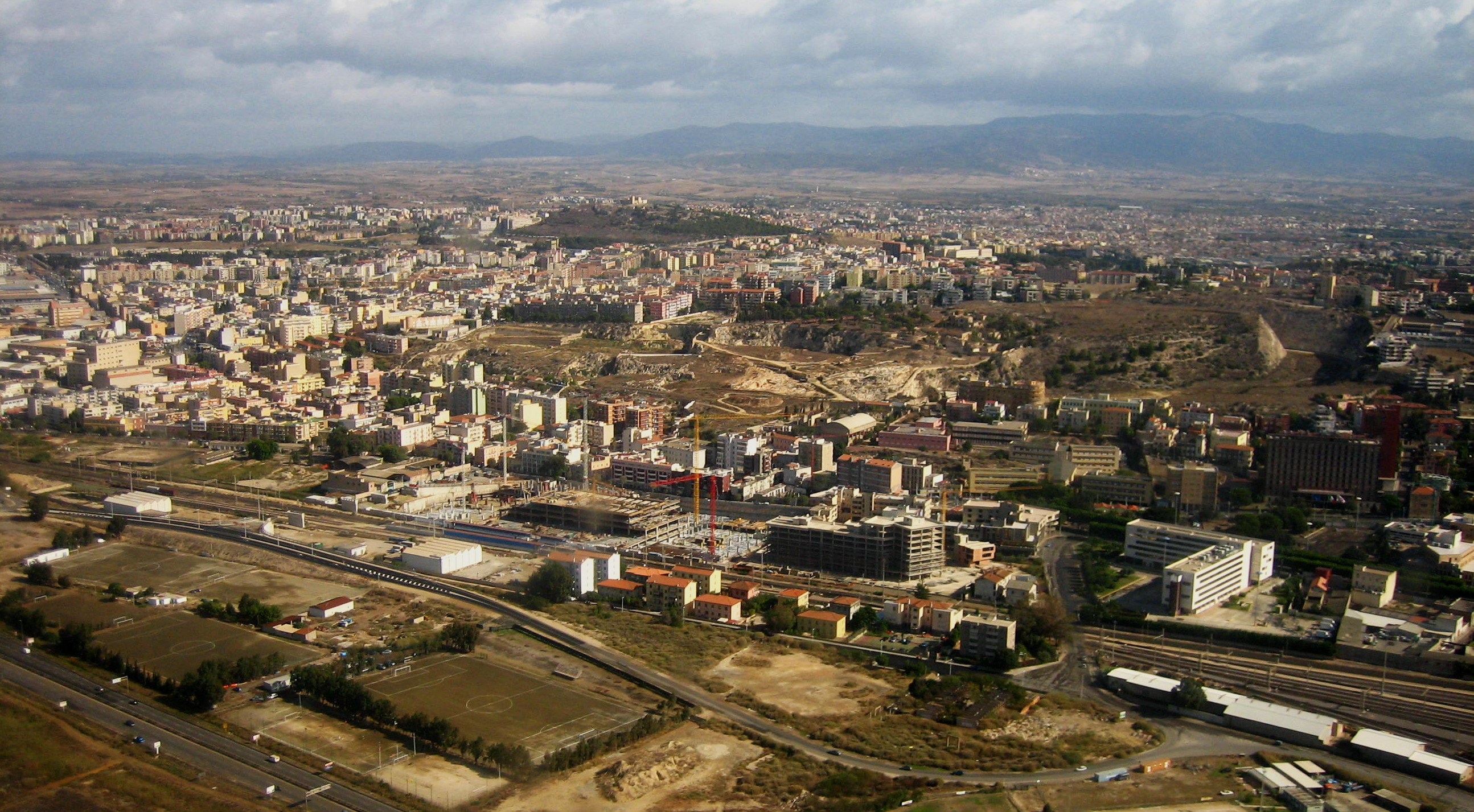
View of the hill of Tuvixeddu (center)

== Sources ==
- Tuvixeddu – Un colle da salvare (in Italian). Cagliari: Legambiente. 1993.
- Marcello Polastri, ed. (2001). Cagliari, la città sotterranea: grotte, cisterne, necropoli e cavità segrete (in Italian). Cagliari: Edizioni Sole.
- Tuvixeddu. La necropoli occidentale di Karales (in Italian). Cagliari: Della Torre. 2000. ISBN 88-7343-323-5.
- Tuvixeddu. Tomba su tomba (in Italian). Cagliari: Archaeological Superintendence of the Provinces of Cagliari and Oristano. 1998.
- Roberto Copparoni; Angelo Pili; Marcello Polastri (2013) [1997]. Tuvixeddu vive (in Italian). Cagliari: Artigianarte. IT\ICCU\CAG\0029495.
- Roberto Copparoni, ed. (June 2014). Carta turistica di Tuvixeddu (in Italian). Translated by Annalisa Pirastu. Associazione di volontariato Amici di Sardegna Cagliari.
