= Megaron temple of Domu de Orgia =

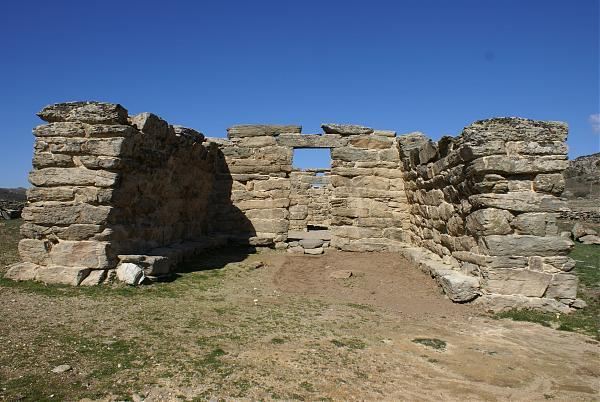
- Interactive map of Megaron temple of Domu de Orgia
- Type: Temple
- Periods: Bronze Age
- Cultures: Nuragic civilization
- Location: Esterzili, Sardinia, Italy

The megaron temple of Domu de Orgia (Sardinian: "house of Orgia") is an important nuragic archaeological site located in the territory of Esterzili, in the Province of South Sardinia.

== Description ==
The temple was built over a pre-existing Nuragic village during the late Bronze Age, near the end of the 13th century BCE and is the largest of the standing megaron temples on Sardinia. A low, elliptical stone wall encloses the main building, which is rectangular and measures 7.79 meters by 22 meters. The wall and temple building are constructed from schist stone. The interior of the temple consists of two rooms preceded by an in antis vestibule.

== Gallery ==
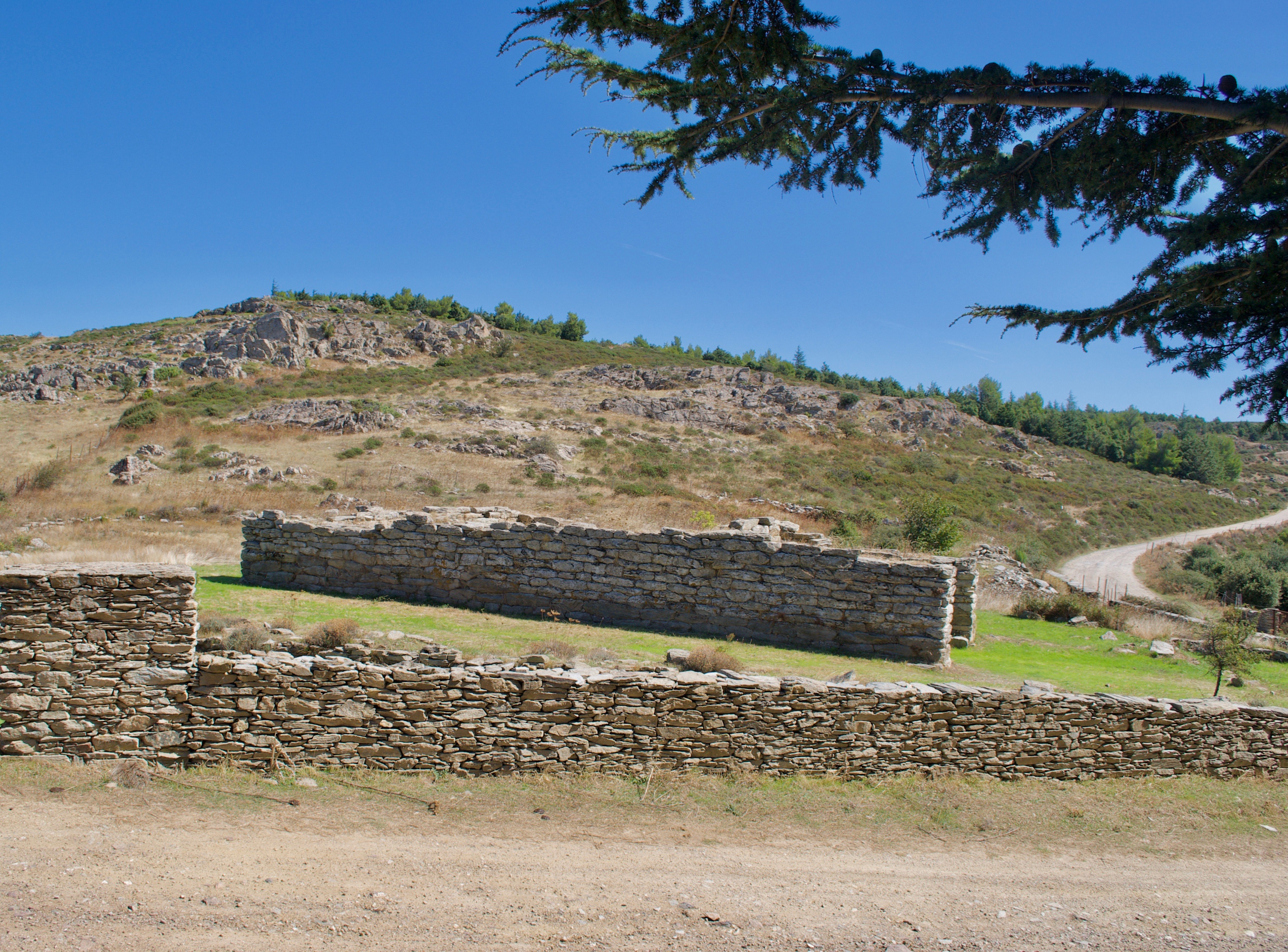
Lateral view

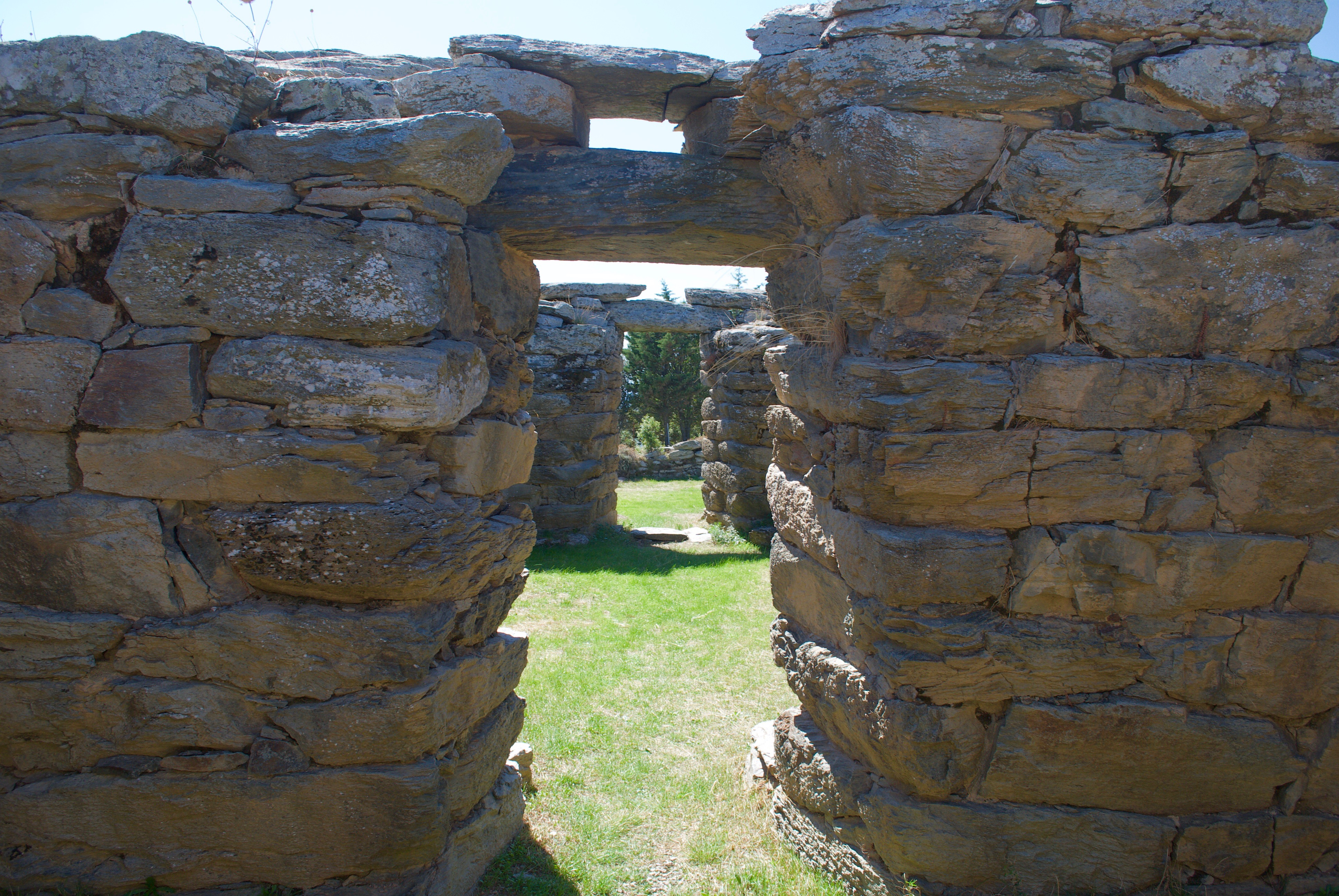
Rooms

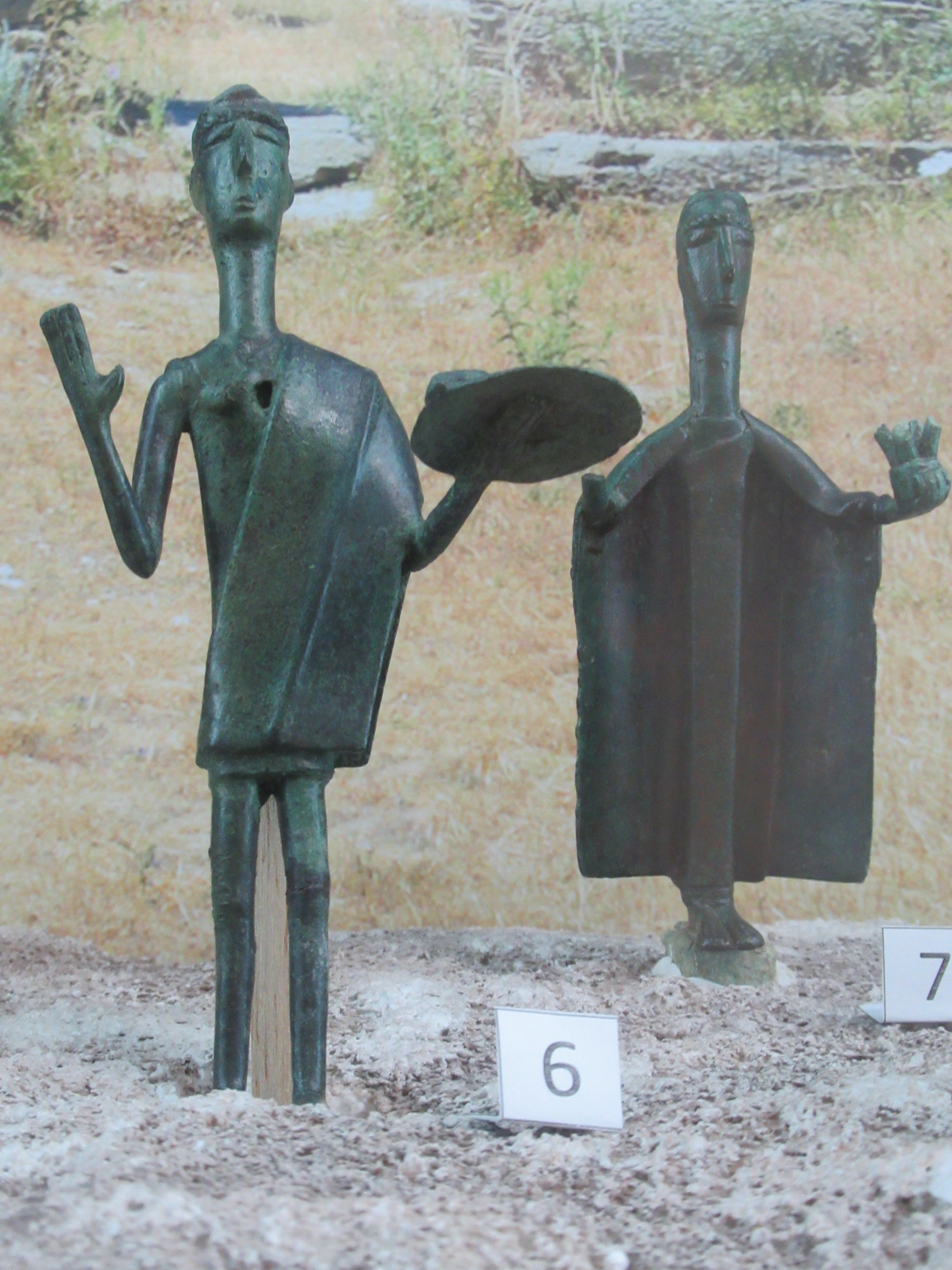
Nuragic bronze statuettes from the site
