= Gaetano Cima =

Italian architect, exponent of the neoclassical movement

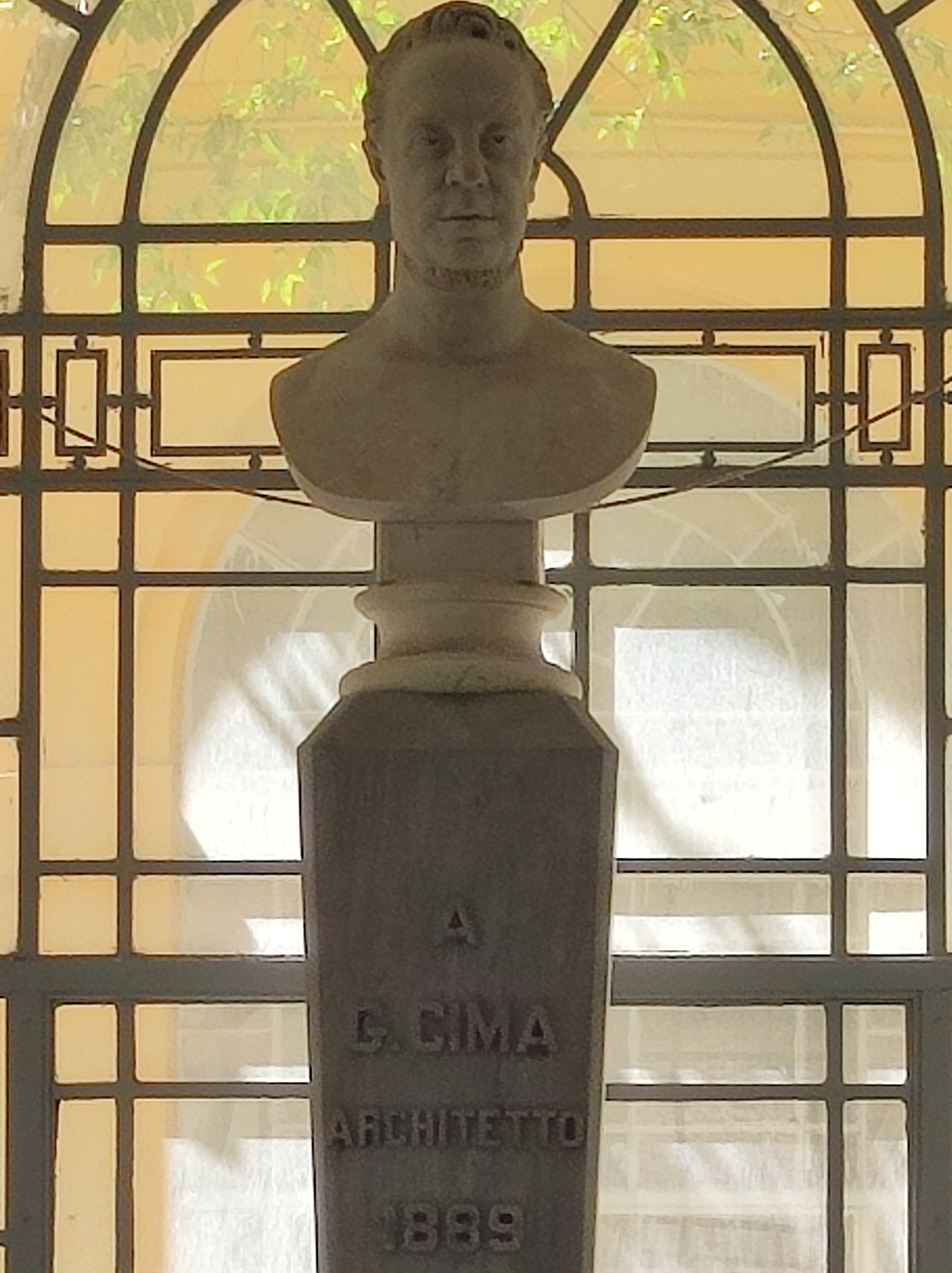
Bust of Gaetano Cima at the San Giovanni di Dio Hospital in Cagliari

Gaetano Cima (1805 in Cagliari – 1878 in Cagliari) was an Italian architect, exponent of the neoclassical movement.

== Biography ==
Gaetano Cima was born in Cagliari, Sardinia by an upper-middle-class family.

Gaetano Cima died in Cagliari in 1878.

There is only one known photograph of Gaetano Cima alive. (Collection Pisu).

== Education ==
He studied architecture in Turin, and later in Rome at the Accademia delle Belle Arti, where he had as professors Luigi Canina and Luigi Poletti, famous Italian neoclassical architects.

He came back to Sardinia when he completed his studies, working as civil engineer in the Cadastre Office in Cagliari.

== Architectural Works In Sardinia ==
He later assumed a professorship at the local university, while conducting projects in association with former classmate and then colleague architect Carlo De Candia; together they beatified the waterfront of Cagliari with buildings presenting lushes balconies and patios, with views to the sea at the best Ligurian style.

== Image gallery ==
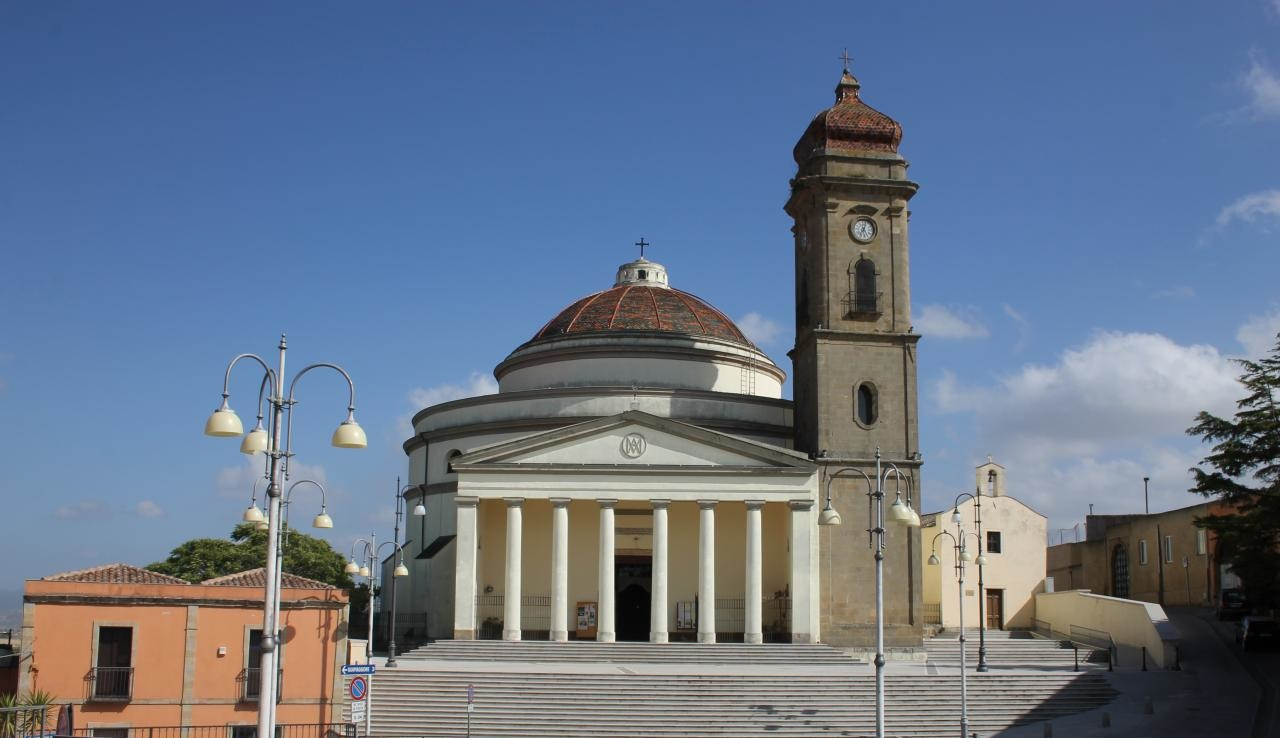
Sanctuary of the Beata Vergine Assunta, Guasila

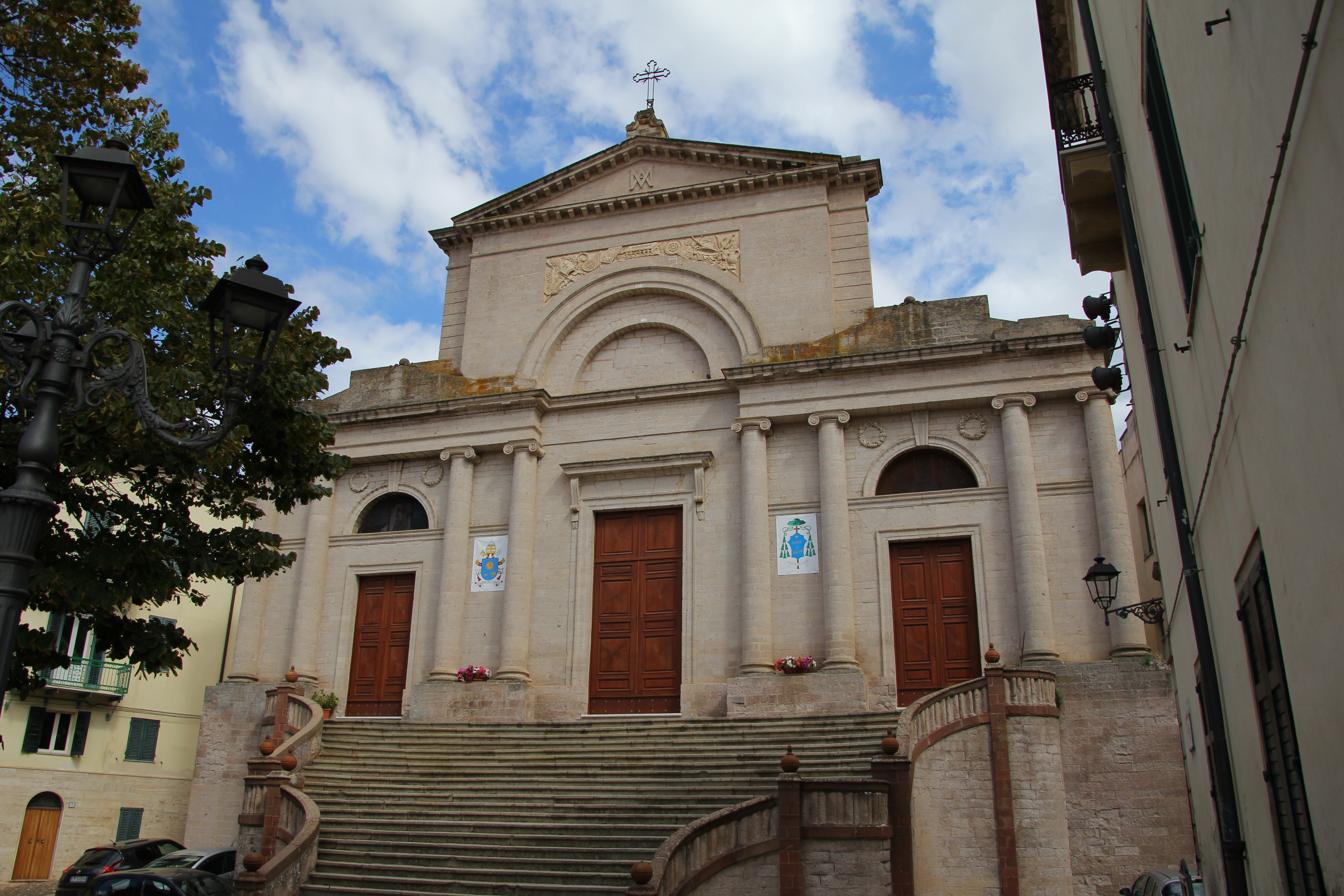
Cathedral of Ozieri

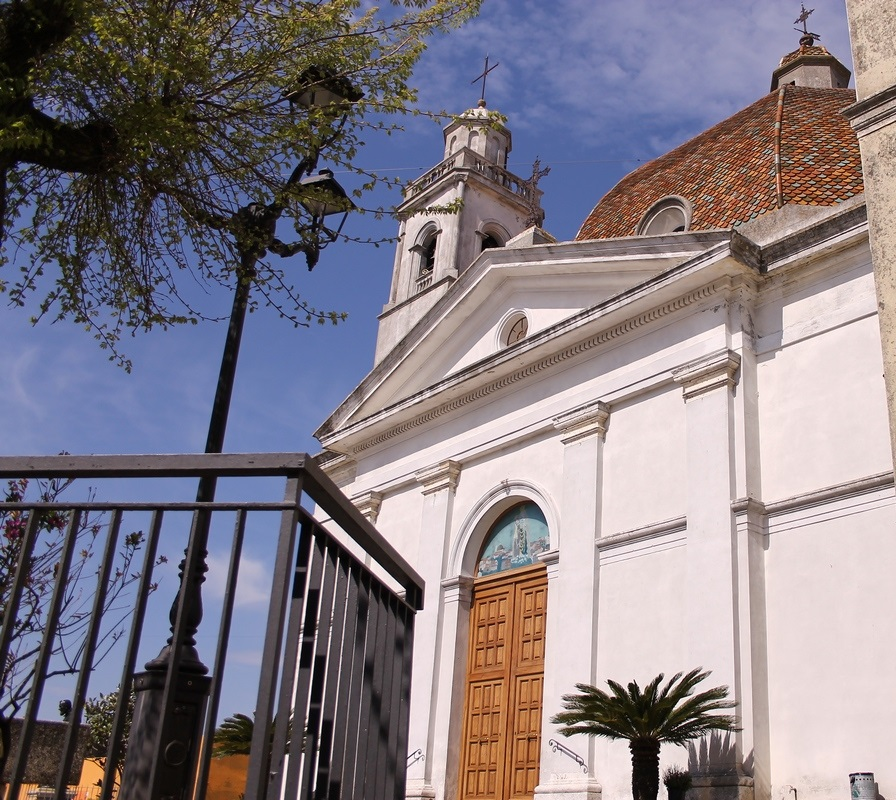
Church of Nostra Signora di Monserrato, Burcei

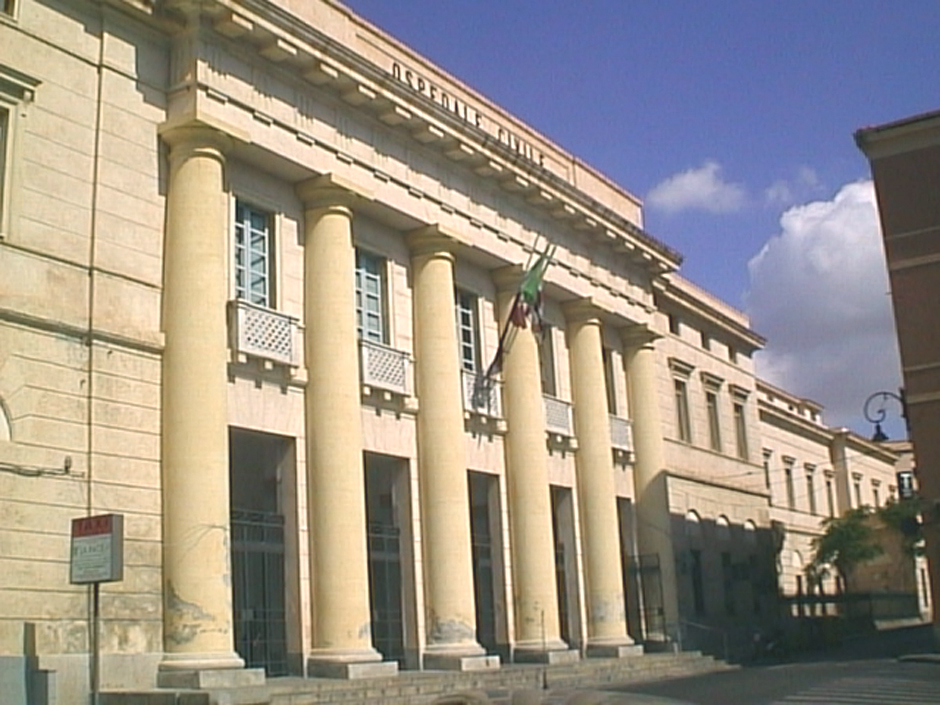
San Giovanni di Dio Hospital in Cagliari

== Bibliography ==
- Salvatore Naitza. Architettura dal tardo '600 al classicismo purista. Cagliari, Ilisso, 1992. ISBN 88-85098-20-7
