= Castle of Acquafredda =

Medieval castle in Sardinia, Italy

- Castello di Acquafredda
- Siliqua
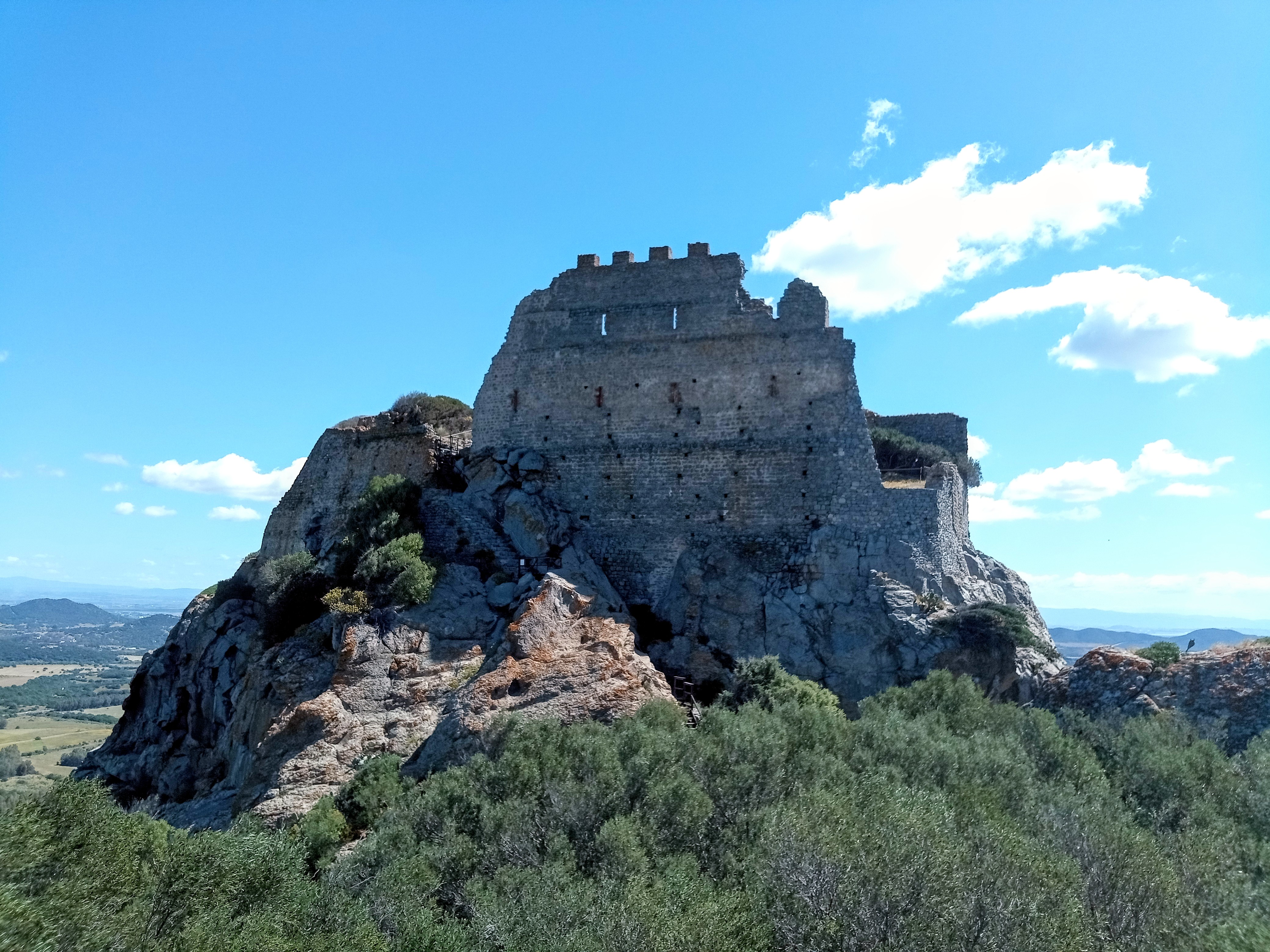
- Castle in Siliqua

Site information
- Type: Castle

Location
- Coordinates: 39.154287°N 8.491279°E

Site history
- Built: 12-13th century

The Castle of Acquafredda (Italian: Castello di Acquafredda) is a medieval castle in Siliqua, province of South Sardinia, Italy.

== History ==
It is fairly widespread opinion that the castle was built by order of Count Ugolino della Gherardesca, who actually became the owner of the fort in 1258. The castle however dates back to an earlier period as it is already mentioned in a papal bull of 1215. After the death Count Ugolino, the castle passed to Pisa and then, in 1324, to the Aragonese. Abandoned since 1410 it later passed to various Sardinian feudal lords until it was ransomed by the king of Sardinia Victor Amadeus III in 1785.

Recently, the excavations near the castle site have yielded the remains, buried in the bare earth, of three man aged 34–45.
