= William III of Cagliari =

William III Salusio VI

Judge/King of Cagliari
- Reign: 1256-1258
- Predecessor: John Torchitorio V
- Born: Cèpola
- Died: After 1258; Genoa
- House: Lacon-Gunale (cognatic Serra branch)
- Father: Russo of Cèpola
- Mother: Mary of Cagliari (daughter of Benedetta of Cagliari)

William III, of the House of Massa, was the last Judge of Cagliari, ruling under the name Salusio VI from 1256 to his deposition in 1258. He is also known as Guglielmo Cepolla or Cipolla.

William was a nephew of Torchitorio V and a cousin of Salusio V. After the assassination of the former, he was proclaimed Judge, but he immediately followed his predecessor in a policy in favour of the Republic of Genoa over and against the pretensions of the Republic of Pisa. In 1258, the Pisan influences in the region — the Gherardeschi, Counts of Donoratico; William of Capraia, acting Judge of Arborea; and John Visconti, Judge of Gallura — invaded Cagliari. They reconquered the castle of Castro and besieged Santa Igia, which received no Genoese aid and was consequently destroyed, and the inhabitants were forced to flee to the interior.

William was deposed, and his giudicato was divided among its conquerors: the northwest third, the old Giudicato of Agugliastra, went to Gallura; the centre was incorporated into Arborea; and the region of Sulcis and Iglesiente (the west) were given to Ugolino della Gherardesca.

== Sources ==
- Boscolo, A. "Chiano di Massa, Guglielmo Cepolla, Genova e la caduta del giudicato di Cagliari (1254–1258)." Miscellanei di storia ligure. IV (1966), pp 7–18.

Preceded by Torchitorio V	Judge of Cagliari; 1256 – 1258	Pisan conquest
