= William II of Cagliari =

William II Salusio V

Judge/King of Cagliari
- Reign: 1233-1254
- Predecessor: Benedetta
- Successor: John Torchitorio V
- Died: 1254
- Issue: John Torchitorio V Jacob
- House: Lacon-Gunale (Serra branch)
- Father: Barisone II Torchitorio IV
- Mother: Benedetta

William II Salusio V (died 1254) was the Judge of Cagliari from 1232 to his death. His Christian name was William, but his regnal name was Salusio, based on ancient Cagliaritan traditions which alternated their rulers between the forenames Torchitorio and Salusio. He would have been called Salusio in official documents, though he is known historically as William, after his grandfather, William I (Salusio IV).

William was the only son of Benedetta and Torchitorio IV of Cagliari. He was born after their marriage in 1214 and before Torchitorio's death in 1217, probably nearer the latter. He was still a child when he first began undersigning the donations of his mother to the Church in the peaceful interval of 1225–1226. Throughout her reign, Benedetta and her husbands — Lamberto Visconti (1220–1225), Henry of Capraia (1227–1228), and Rinaldo Glandi (1230–1232) — exercised the government nominally on his behalf, though his mother ruled also in her own right. In 1230, Ubaldo of Gallura invaded Cagliari, but the Gherardeschi of Pisa repulsed him in the name of Benedetta and the young William.

Benedetta died late in 1233 or early in 1234 and the Giudicato of Cagliari was divided between several powerful Pisan families. Though William was her successor, his rule was nominal, all the more so because he was still too young to rule in his own right and was put under the regency of his mother's sister Agnes and her husband, Marianus II of Logudoro. Nevertheless, in reality, he was a puppet of the Pisans.

In 1235, he attained his majority and volitionally submitted completely to Pisa. His reign, however, was consequently peaceful, though he did make war on the Visconti of Gallura until 1244 with the support of Ranieri della Gherardesca di Bolgheri, second husband of Agnes. In 1239, he made a treaty with Leonard, Archbishop of Cagliari, but he was but a pawn in the Pisan game and his writ lacked any value. He died in 1254. His son John succeeded him as Torchitorio V.

== Sources ==
- Ghisalberti, Alberto M. Dizionario Biografico degli Italiani: VIII Bellucci – Beregan. Rome, 1966.
- Solmi, A. Studi storici sulle istituzioni della Sardegna nel Medioevo. Cagliari, 1917.
- Loddo Canepa, F. "Note sulle condizioni economiche e giuridiche degli abitanti di Cagliari dal secolo XI al XIX." Studi sardi. X–XI, 1952, pp 237ff.

Preceded by Benedetta	Judge of Cagliari; 1232–1254	Succeeded by John
