= Adelasia of Torres =

Adelasia

Judge/Queen of Logudoro/Torres
- Reign: 1236–1259
- Predecessor: Barisone III
- Successor: Position abolished
- Co-ruler: Ubaldo (1236–1238); Enzo (1238–1245/46)
- Born: 1207; Ardara
- Died: 1259 (aged 51–52); Burgos
- Spouses: Ubaldo, King of Gallura; Enzo, King of Sardinia
Names
- Adelasia de Lacon-Gunale
- House: Lacon-Gunale
- Father: Marianus II, King of Torres
- Mother: Agnes of Cagliari

Adelasia (1207–1259), was the Judge of Logudoro from 1236 and the titular Judge of Gallura from 1238.

== Life ==
She was the eldest child of Marianus II of Logudoro by Agnes of Massa, daughter of William I of Cagliari, and successor of her brother, Barisone III.

By a pact signed between her father, who had interests in Gallura, and Gallurese judge, the Pisan Lamberto Visconti in November 1218, Adelasia first married the heir of Gallura, Lamberto's son Ubaldo II in 1219. Pope Honorius III, enemy of the Pisans, immediately sent his chaplain Bartolomeo to annul the marriage, but he failed and the pact between Pisa and Logudoro stood.

Ubaldo inherited the Giudicato of Gallura in 1225. Marianus died in 1232 and, by his will, was succeeded by his son Barisone III. Upon Barisone's death (1236) without heirs, also as stipulated by Marianus' will, the Logudorese magnates could elect one of his daughters, Adelasia or Benedetta, to inherit. They unanimously acclaimed Adelasia, whose husband could well uphold her right. So they in turn elected him judge as well. In 1237, Pope Gregory IX sent his chaplain Alexander to Torres to receive recognition from Adelasia of papal suzerainty over Logudoro, as well as the lands she inherited from her grandfather William of Cagliari, in Pisa, Massa, and Corsica. At the palace of Ardara, in the presence of the Camaldolese abbot and monks of S. Trinità di Saccargia, she made the oath of vassalage and Ubaldo affirmed it, giving over the castle of Monte Acuto to the bishop of Ampurias as a guarantee of his good faith. Ubaldo did not, however, recognise any authority over Gallura other than the ancient authority of the Pisan archdiocese.

By Ubaldo's will, drawn up in January 1237 at Silki, Gallura was to be inherited by his cousin John Visconti. Peter II of Arborea became Adelasia's protector. She remarried quickly to Guelfo dei Porcari, a person devoted to the Holy See. He did not live long after, though. At that time, the Doria family of Genoa, Pisa's main rival, convinced the Emperor Frederick II to marry his bastard son Enzo to Adelasia and create a Kingdom of Sardinia. Enzo arrived from Cremona in October the same year as Ubaldo's death and the two were married and titled King and Queen of Sardinia. Enzo left for the peninsula in July 1239 and never returned, being taken prisoner by the Guelphs, an imprisonment which was to prove lifelong. In 1245 or 1246, the marriage was annulled.

After this date, Adelasia, saddened and tired of active government, retired to her castle of Goceano. She died in 1259, without heirs, and her territory was divided amongst the Doria, Malaspina, and Spinola families, who all held it from Genoa. The neighbouring Giudicato of Arborea succeeded in taking some land. Sassari expelled its Pisan governor with the support of the Doria, refortified its defences, and adopted a republican model of government in alliance with Genoa, which sent an annual podestà.

== Sources ==
- Henry Gardiner Adams, ed. (1857). "Adelasia". A Cyclopaedia of Female Biography: 10. Wikidata Q115299077.
- Costa, Enrico, Adelasia di Torres, Ilisso, Nuoro 2008.
- Ferrabino, Aldo (ed). Dizionario Biografico degli Italiani: I Aaron – Albertucci. Rome, 1960.
- Sperle, Christian (2001). König Enzo von Sardinien und Friedrich von Antiochia. Zwei illegitime Söhne Kaiser Friedrichs II. und ihre Rolle in der Verwaltung des Regnum Italiae. ISBN 3-631-37457-7.
- Onnis, Omar; Mureddu, Manuelle (2019). Illustres. Vita, morte e miracoli di quaranta personalità sarde (in Italian). Sestu: Domus de Janas. ISBN 978-88-97084-90-7. OCLC 1124656644.

== See also ==
- Enzio of Sardinia
- Giudicato of Logudoro
- Marianus II of Logudoro

Preceded by Barisone III	Judge of Logudoro; 1236–1259	Succeeded by none
Preceded by Ubaldo	— TITULAR — Judge of Gallura; 1238–1257 with Enzo	Succeeded by John
