= Marianus II of Torres =

Marianus II
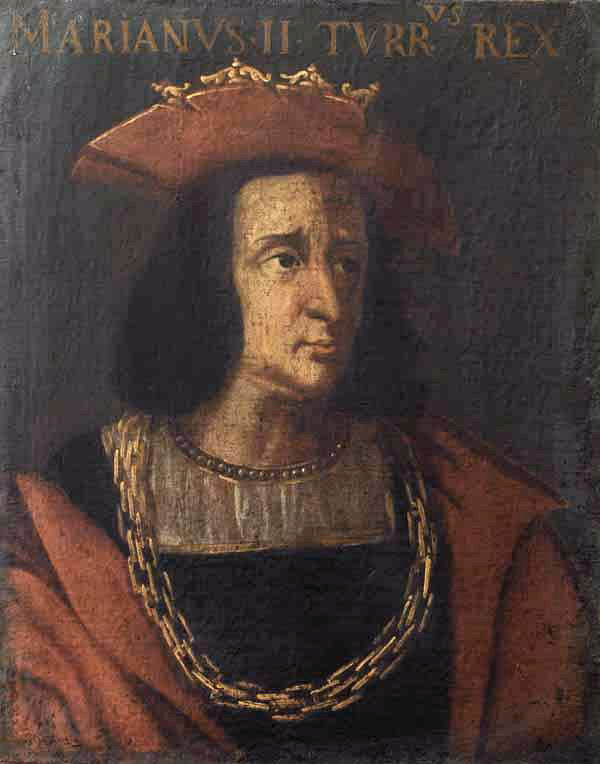

Judge/King of Logudoro/Torres
- Reign: 1218-1232
- Predecessor: Comita II
- Successor: Barisone III
- Born: Sassari
- Died: 1232
- Spouse: Agnes of Cagliari
- Issue: Barisone III, King of Torres; Benedetta; Adelasia, Queen of Torres
Names
- Marianus de Lacon-Gunale
- House: Lacon-Gunale
- Father: Comita II, King of Torres
- Mother: Sinispella of Arborea

Marianus II (died 1232) was the Judge of Logudoro from 1218 until his death. He was an ally of the Republic of Genoa and enemy of Pisa.

He was a son of Comita III (by his wife Ispella of Arborea), who associated him with the government of Logudoro as early as 1203. He succeeded his father in 1218. Mariane was half-brother of Hugh I of Arborea.

His sister Maria was in 1202 married to Boniface, the heir of the Marquess of Saluzzo; their son Manfred became the third marquess. Marianus' sister Iurgia (Giorgia) was in 1210 married to Emanuele Doria, heir of the Genovese fortress in Logudorese coast.

Around 1200, Comita III came to terms with William I of Cagliari and Ubaldo I Visconti, promising to marry his son Marianus to William's daughter Agnes.

By a pact signed November 1218 with Lambert of Gallura, Marianus secured the marriage of his daughter Adelasia to Lambert's son Ubaldo. The marriage was celebrated in 1219. Pope Honorius III, enemy of the Pisans, immediately sent his chaplain Bartolomeo to annul the marriage, but he failed and the pact between Pisa and Logudoro stood. Honorius nevertheless urged Milan to aid Marianus in any opposition to Pisa.

In 1228, Peter II of Arborea allied with the Visconti of Gallura. He was consequently attacked by Marianus in concert with William II of Cagliari. They desired to maintain a condominium in Arborea, but internal fighting allowed Peter to solidify his authority with little opposition.

From 1230 to 1232, Marianus exercised the regency of Cagliari on behalf of the young William II and in right of his wife Agnes. He died in 1233 and, by his will, was succeeded by his son Barison III. Upon Barison's death (1236) without heirs, the Logudorese magnates, as specified by Marianus' will, had to elect one of his daughters Adelasia or Benedetta (who is thought to have married the Catalan Count of Empuries) to inherit. They unanimously acclaimed Adelasia, whose husband could well uphold her right. So they in turn elected him judge as well.

== Sources ==
- Ghisalberti, Alberto M. Dizionario Biografico degli Italiani: VIII Bellucci – Beregan. Rome, 1966.
- Caravale, Mario (ed). Dizionario Biografico degli Italiani: Guglielmo Gonzaga – Jacobini. Rome, 2000.
- Nowé, Laura Sannia. Dai "lumi" dalla patria Italiana: Cultura letteraria sarda. Mucchi Editore: Modena, 1996.

Preceded by Comita III	Judge of Logudoro; 1218–1232	Succeeded by Barison III
