= Biagio (archbishop of Torres) =

Biagio (or Blaise, Latin Blasius) was the Archbishop of Torres from 1 December 1202 to his death late 1214 or early 1215.

He was originally from the diocese of Nevers. He went to Rome and became a subdeacon and then a papal notary before 1200. By the influence of Pope Innocent III, he was elected to the vacant see of Porto Torres in 1202. He was consecrated sometime before 7 March 1203. One of his first acts was to order the giudici to punish the murderers of the bishop of Ploaghe, the abbot of Tregu, and the vicar of Camaldoli.

On 10 March 1203, the pope put Comita III of Logudoro under the protection of Biagio and not of Pisa in light of the invasion of Logudoro by William I of Cagliari. On 22 March, with papal consent, he gave Christian burial to Comita's father, Constantine II, who had died excommunicate. In a letter dated that same day to Comita, William, and Hugh I of Arborea, the pope ordered the giudici to take an oath of allegiance to Biagio, thus breaking their link of fidelity to Pisa. Biagio had trouble extracting the oath from William, who had previously made it to Uberto, Archbishop of Pisa. On 15 September, Innocent absolved William of the oath.

In that year, Barisone II of Gallura died and left the succession to Gallura in the hands of the pope, who gave Biagio the responsibility of arranging a marriage for the Gallurese heiress Elena. In 1203, he tried to marry her to Ittocorre of Torres and in 1206 to Trasmondo, a relative of the pope's, but both of these arrangements fell through, and Elena married Lamberto di Eldizio without Biagio's approval, but with the support of the local clergy, who detested Logudorese supremacy.

In a letter of 3 July 1204, Innocent confirmed the apostolic legateship to Uberto of Pisa only while he was on the island. Then the three Sardinian archbishops – Biagio, Riccus of Cagliari, and Bernard of Arborea – excommunicated the giudici for trying to solve their problems in the saecular forum (i.e., through war).

Biagio maintained good relations with Comita. He offered to divorce Comita from his wife if he would abandon his mistress and he revoked the excommunication of Comita's relative, Ittocorre de Thoris, for murdering the bishop of Ampurias. Biagio did not have a good relationship with the other giudici, however. He had to reprove Hugh of Arborea and the archbishop of Cagliari for the incestuous marriage of Hugh to a daughter of William of Cagliari (27 October 1207). On 3 September 1211, he accused William of violence against women and the usurpation of Arborea. However, Biagio's relationship with the papacy soon deteriorated and Innocent ordered him to confirm the marriage alliance between the houses of Bas (Arborea) and Massa (Cagliari). Nevertheless, in April 1213, Innocent gave the right to him and the archbishop of Cagliari of preaching the Fifth Crusade in Sardinia. Biagio died less than two years later, probably at Cagliari.

== Sources ==
- Ghisalberti, Aldo (ed). Dizionario Biografico degli Italiani: X Biagio – Boccaccio. Rome, 1968.
- Moore, John C. "Pope Innocent III, Sardinia, and the Papal State." Speculum, Vol. 62, No. 1. (Jan., 1987), pp 81–101.
