= Torchitorio V of Cagliari =

John Torchitorio V

Judge/King of Cagliari
- Reign: 1254–1256
- Predecessor: William II Torchitorio V
- Successor: William III Salusio VI
- Died: 1256
- House: Lacon-Gunale (Serra branch)
- Father: William II Torchitorio V

Torchitorio V (died 1256), born John and known as Chiano or Chianni, was the Giudice (Judge) of Cagliari from 1250 to his death. His reign was brief but transformative in the history of Sardinia.

He may have been the son of his predecessor William II. All that is certain about his family is that he was himself a Massa and that his mother was a Serra. His birthplace and date are unknown and he had no wife or children. The date of his succession is also presumptive, as there is a silence in the sources between the last mention of William II and the first of Torchitorio V.

When he first appeared as Judge in 1254, he was ruling in name only; the real power in Cagliari was in the hands of the families of the Gherardeschi, Visconti, and Capraia. Chiano did homage to the Republic of Pisa for Cagliari. In 1254, he took over the palace in Cagliari, though probably not by force. On 23 September, he drew up a will, declaring his heirs to be his cousins William III and Rinaldo Cepolla.

Frustrated by the increasing interference of Pisa in his giudicato, Chiano cautiously turned to the Republic of Genoa for allies. In February 1256, he sent two envoys (procuratores) to Genoa to sign a pact on 20 April. On 25 May, Chiano affirmed it in the cathedral chapel of his castle in the presence of Malocello and Percivalle Doria. By the terms of the treaty, both allies owed the other military assistance in all their wars. Chiano became a Genoese citizen and rendered homage to the two representatives of the Republic. Cagliari granted Genoa the tax-free export of salt. All Cagliaritan castles were to be shared between the alliance, but in reality Genoa controlled them. Chiano was left with only a house in Cagliari, but he was offered a palace in Genoa and the hand in marriage of daughter of Malocello's family, which he was constrained by the treaty to accept. Meanwhile, Ogerio Scoto and Giovanni Pontano were sent to Cagliari as podestà and castellan respectively. Chiano then expelled the Pisans from the Castel di Castro and granted it to the Genoese.

Following this, the filopisani judges of Gallura and Arborea, John Visconti and William of Capraia, invaded Cagliari and besieged the eponymous chief city. Gherardo and Ugolino della Gherardesca brought eight ships to the siege on behalf of Pisa. Chiano, then in Genoa, left that city with twenty four galleys and followed the Tuscan coast, capturing some Pisan vessels along the way. He arrived at Cagliari too late, was defeated and captured. He was quickly assassinated by a Pisan at Santa Igia later that year. The battle and his death occurred sometime between 17 July and 15 October.

He was succeeded on the throne by his cousin William III, in accordance with his will of 1254. There is a street named Via Giudice Chiano in Cagliari today.

== Sources ==
- Boscolo, A. "Chiano di Massa, Guglielmo Cepolla, Genova e la caduta del giudicato di Cagliari (1254–1258)." Miscellanei di storia ligure. IV (1966), pp 7–18.
- Ghisalberti, Alberto M. Dizionario Biografico degli Italiani. Rome.

Preceded by William II	Giudice of Cagliari; 1250–1256	Succeeded by William III
