= Ubaldo I Visconti =

Ubaldo I Visconti (died 1230) was the de jure overlord of the Giudicato of Cagliari from 1217. He was a member of the Visconti family of Pisa, controlling Cagliari on behalf of his brother, who was judge jure uxoris from 1218.

His grandfather, Alberto, was a patrician of Pisa, while his father, Eldizio, was patrician and consul. He and his brother Lamberto in turn served as patrician and podestà. Ubaldo's grandmother was Aligarda and his mother was a daughter of Torchitorio III of Cagliari, through whom he would have inherited some claim on the giudicato.

Around 1200, Ubaldo was assisting William I of Cagliari on behalf of Pisa in a war with Comita III of Logudoro when the two warring giudici came to terms.

In 1212, there was complete anarchy in Pisa. A pro-Visconti faction was at war with an anti-Visconti one. In mid-January 1213, William of Cagliari led the forces of Massa, Pistoia, the anti-Visconti faction in Pisa, and the militia of Guido Guerra III to victory near Massa over the forces of Lucca supported by the Visconti under Ubaldo, and by the deposed Pisan podestà Goffredo Musto. Pisa was forced to accept four rectores, only one of which was a Visconti.

In 1214, Lamberto and Ubaldo took the opportunity that year to launch an offensive at Cagliari and Arborea, but were beaten off by Comita and Genoa. The war continued at sea, but was arrested by the entreaties of Pope Honorius III, who forced Comita to come to terms with Pisa (1 December 1217).

In 1215, profiting from the weakness of the giudicessa Benedetta of Cagliari, Lamberto assembled a large fleet and landed an army at Cagliari. He captured the adjacent hill, S. Gilla, which dominated the city, and fortified it. To Ubaldo he gave the job of finishing the conquest and securing Pisan control of Cagliari. He forced Benedetta to flee her capital. In 1217, Ubaldo forced her to accept terms surrendering Cagliari. She received her giudicato back as fief from the consul of Pisa. However, violence between Sardinians and Pisans escalated in Cagliari and Benedetta and her husband, Torchitorio IV, made an alliance with Comita and Genoa in hopes of expelling the Pisans.

Meanwhile, Lambert's wife, Elena of Gallura, died sometime before 1220 and, in 1218, a year after the death of Benedetta's husband, Ubaldo arranged the marriage of Benedetta with Lamberto. The two were married, despite papal objections, on 9 April 1220.

In 1230, Ubaldo, who had controlled Cagliari since 1215, died. His nephew, Lamberto's son, Ubaldo II, inherited his position. His son John would be Ubaldo II's successor in the Giudicato of Gallura.

== Sources ==
- Ferrabino, Aldo (ed). Dizionario Biografico degli Italiani: I Aaron – Albertucci. Rome, 1960.
