= Peire de la Caravana =

Italian troubadour

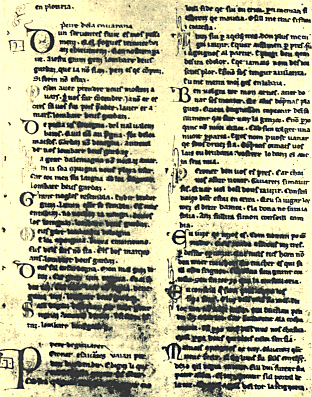
D'un serventes faire in an Italian manuscript of 1254, now in Modena. Centred at the top of the left column is the name "Peire dela Cauarana".

Peire de la Caravana (also Cavarana, Gavarana, or Cà Varana, perhaps meaning "near Verona") was an Italian troubadour (trovatore) in Lombardy in the late 12th and early 13th centuries. He was one of the earliest Occitan troubadours in Italy. He is famous for his sirventes.

Among his preserved works are the sirventes D'un serventes faire and La Paz de Costanza. Peire wrote the first encouraging the communes of northern Italy to resist German overlordship, which has been dated to as early as 1157. However, Peire incites the Lombard cities by harkening back to the fate of the baronage of Apulia who had resisted the Germans earlier:

Lombart, beus gardaz
Que ja non siaz
Pejer que compraz,
Si ferm non estaz!
De Pulla'us sovegna
Dels valens baros
Qu'il non an que pegna
For de lor maisos;
Gardaz non devegna
Autretal de vos!

This has led some to date it to 1194, when Henry VI conquered Sicily or as late as 1225, when the city-states of northern Italy renewed the old Lombard League in opposition to Henry's son, Frederick I of Sicily, Holy Roman Emperor.

Writing in Lombardy in the Occitan tongue under the nominal sovereignty of the German monarch, Peire took the opportunity to poke fun at the German language, writing in a famously debated passage:

Granoglas resembla [la gent d'Alemanha]
En dir(e): Broder, guaz;
Lairan, quant s'asembla
Cum cans enrabjaz.

Frogs resemble [the people of Germany]
In saying: Brother, watz!
The sound of which as much resembles
Dogs barking.

The German word "watz" is said to be an interjection resembling the clinking of glasses and proposes a toast.

Peire also had ties to Sardinia. He dedicated his D'un serventes faire to a senhal Malgrat de toz, which has been identified as Barisone II of Arborea, who was crowned King of Sardinia at Pavia by the Emperor Frederick I in return for 4,000 silver marks from Genoa, but was later deposed. Peire later had contact with the cultured Judge of Cagliari, Salusio IV.

== Sources ==
- Scaglione, Aldo. Knights at Court: Courtliness, Chivalry, and Courtesy from Ottonian Germany to the Italian Renaissance. Berkeley: University of California Press, 1991.
- Vigneras, Louis André. "Etudes sur Jean Renart I. Sur la Date du Roman de l'Escoufle." Modern Philology, Vol. 30, No. 3. (Feb., 1933), pp 241–262.
- Spitzer, Leo. "Review of 'Propalladia' and Other Works of Bartolomé de Torres Naharro." de Torres Naharro, Bartolomé. ed. Gillet, Joseph E. Hispanic Review, Vol. 21, No. 1. (Jan., 1953), pp 62–75.
