= Torchitorio III of Cagliari =

Peter Torchitorio III
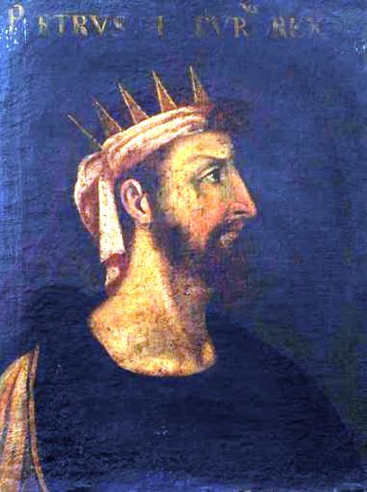

Judge/King of Cagliari
- Reign: 1163-1188
- Predecessor: Marianus II Torchitorio II
- Successor: William I Salusio IV
- Died: After 1188
- Spouse: Sinispella of Cagliari
- House: Lacon-Gunale (Thori branch)
- Father: Gonario II, King of Torres
- Mother: Mary Ebriaci

The Giudicati of Sardinia.

Torchitorio III (died after 1188), born Peter, was the Judge of Cagliari from October 1163 to his deposition and arrest in 1188, after which he was never heard of again.

Peter was a younger son of Gonario II of Logudoro. In 1147, he received the curatoria of Ottana. He married the eldest daughter of Constantine II of Cagliari, whose name is unknown, sometime before 1163. Following Constantine's death without surviving sons in October 1163, Peter "inherited" the giudicato jure uxoris. In fact, he was proclaimed with strong Pisan support. However, Barisone II of Arborea, as a direct descendant of Constantine II laid claim to Cagliari. He invaded the giudicato and forced Peter to flee to the court of his elder brother Barisone II of Logudoro at Porto Torres. In March 1164, the Barisone and Peter, united with the Pisans of the island, retook the city of Cagliari and then invaded Arborea in April. The judge of Arborea took refuge in the castle of Cabras.

In 1166, Peter and his brother travelled to Pisa to try to explain the bloody reprisals of their citizens against the Pisans in Ottana. Returning to Sardinia, the two made a pact with the Republic of Genoa, ally of the Arboreans. In 1168, a treaty was negotiated by the Genoese diplomat Nuvolone Alberici between Genoa and Arborea on one side and Pisa, Logudoro, and Cagliari on the other. It patched up the differences which had led to the last war and restored some lost land to Arborea.

In 1180, Barisone of Arborea made war on Cagliari. He had initial successes, but was captured and forced to come to terms. In 1183, Pisa reoccupied Cagliari. By 1186, Barisone of Logudoro had gone back over to the Pisan side, while Peter remained with Genoa. He tried to expel the Pisans from Cagliari and he made war on Peter I of Arborea. In 1187, open conflict raged over the whole island of Sardinia between the Genoese and their factions and the Pisans and theirs. The Pisans mercilessly assaulted Genoese merchants in Cagliari and despoiled their landed possessions, evicting them from the giudicato. They encouraged Obert, Margrave of Massa, and his son, William, to invade Cagliari and establish Pisan authority. Obert was the husband and William the son of Giorgia, the younger sister of Peter's wife. On this basis, William laid claim to the giudicato. In 1188, he captured Peter and imprisoned him. He probably took control of the giudicato, though the next few years are extremely obscure. Peter never resurfaced and probably died in prison or was killed.

Peter had two daughters. One died in infancy. The other married Eldizio Visconti and became the mother of Lamberto and Ubaldo I Visconti.

== Sources ==
- Caravale, Mario (ed). Dizionario Biografico degli Italiani: XXVII Guglielmo Gonzaga – Jacobini. Rome, 2000.
- Ghisalbert, Alberto M. (ed). Dizionario Biografico degli Italiani: VI Baratteri – Bartolozzi. Rome, 1964.

Preceded by Salusio III	Judge of Cagliari; 1163 – 1188	Succeeded by Salusio IV
