= Judicate of Cagliari =

Medieval kingdom in Sardinia

Judicate of Cagliari Iudicatus Karalitanus Càlaris
- 1020–1258
- Coat of arms

- Judicate of Cagliari
- Capital: Santa Igia
- Common languages: Sardinian, Latin
- Religion: Roman Catholic
- Government: Judicate (kingdom)
- Judge
  - 1089 – 1102: Constantine I of Cagliari
  - 1214–1232: Benedetta of Cagliari
  - 1256 – 1258: William III of Cagliari
- History
  - Established: 1020
  - Disestablished: 1258
Preceded by	Succeeded by
Byzantine Empire	Republic of Pisa; Judicate of Arborea

The Judicate of Cagliari (Sardinian: Judicadu de Càralis / Càlaris, Italian: Giudicato di Cagliari) was one of the four kingdoms or judicates (iudicati, literally "judgeship") into which Sardinia was divided during the Middle Ages.

The Judicate of Cagliari occupied the entire southern portion of the island and was composed of thirteen subdivisions called curatoriae. It bordered the judicates of Arborea to the northwest and Logudoro and Gallura to the northeast.

== Origins and extent ==
The exact date of founding of the Judicate of Cagliari is unknown. After the Byzantine Empire's conquest of Sardinia in 534 as part of the Vandalic War, the island became one of the provinces of the Exarchate of Africa and was governed by a magistrate, Iudex Provinciae, resident in Cagliari.

Sardinia remained a Byzantine province until the early 8th century, when Arab and Berber expansionism and piracy on the Mediterranean began to make communications with the Imperial government at Constantinople very difficult. The Arabs began their conquest of Sicily in 827, and Sardinia itself endured several Moorish raids. As the Empire found it increasingly difficult to supply and defend its westernmost provinces, the Byzantine iudices (judges) heading the local administration in Sardinia were forced to govern autonomously and thus gradually became de facto independent.

Cagliari, the capital in turn of the Roman, Vandal and Byzantine provinces of Sardinia, was historically the largest and most important of the cities on the island. However, starting from the 8th to 9th century the city was abandoned because it was too exposed to attacks by Moorish pirates. Apparently many inhabitants left Cagliari and founded a new town named Santa Igia in an area close to the Santa Gilla swamp to the west of Cagliari, but distant from the sea. Santa Igia then became the capital of the Judicate of Cagliari, one of the four kingdoms that evolved when Imperial power receded in the West.

The Judicate of Cagliari comprised a large area of the Campidano plain, the mineral-rich Sulcis region, and the mountainous Ogliastra.

== The first judges ==
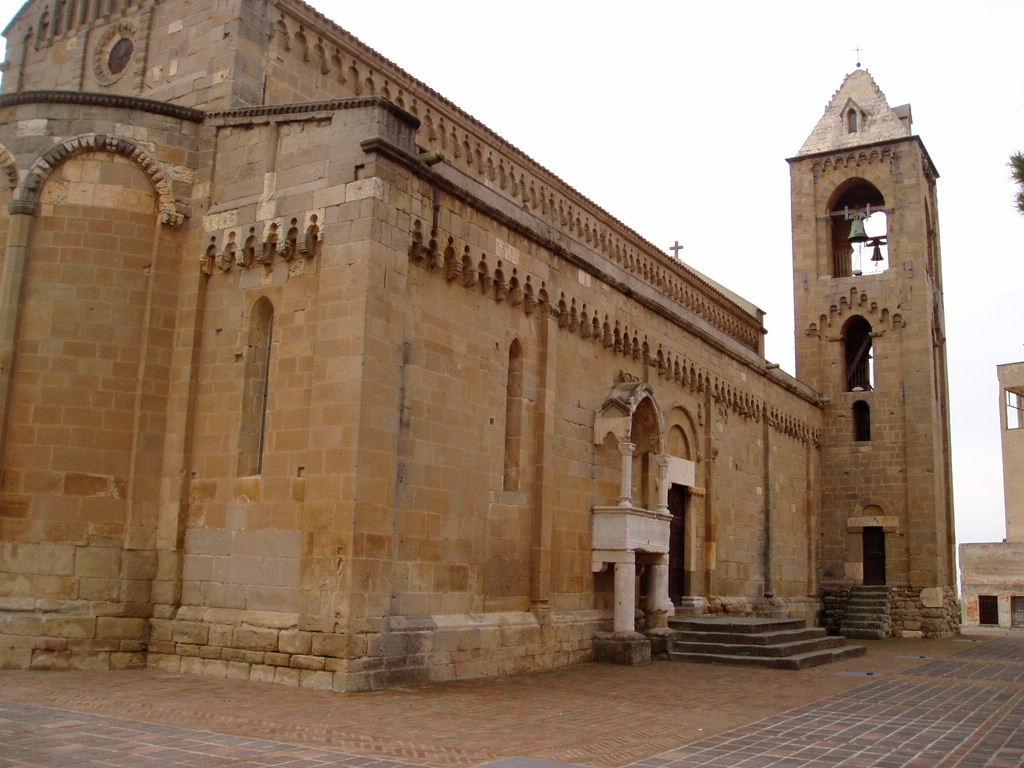
Dolianova Cathedral

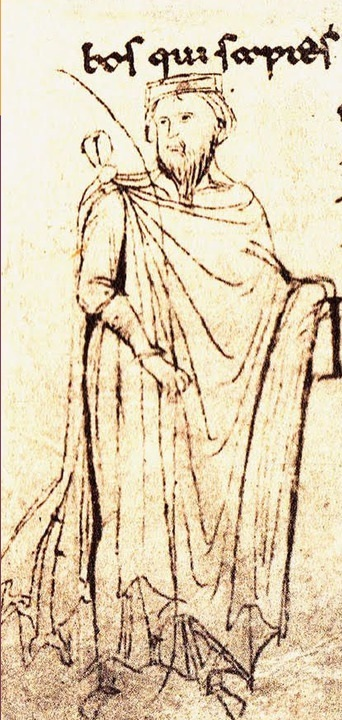
Orzocco of Cagliari, Registrum Petri Diaconi by an unknown author, between 1131 and 1133

The first giudice well known to history is Torchitorio I of the Lacon-Gunale family. His birth name was Orzocco, Torchitorio being a dynastic name. The first ruling dynasty, the Lacon-Gunale, probably arose from the merger of two families, the Lacon and the Gunale (or Unale). Perhaps in honor of two members of these families (Salusio de Lacon and Torchitorio de Gunale) all rulers of Cagliari traditionally adopted a moniker added to their birth name, alternating between Salusio and Torchitorio. Torchitorio I was judge at a time when Western monasticism was being introduced into Sardinia as part of the Gregorian reform of the Papacy. Cagliari, like the other giudicati, was placed under papal and Pisan authority. Torchitorio was a sponsor of the monks of Monte Cassino who were arriving on the island to bring economic, technological, and religious renewal. Torchitorio succeeded in having his son succeed him around 1089, when Constantine I appeared with the title of rex et iudex Caralitanus: "King and Judge of Cagliari."

Among the traditions of these early giudici was that of confirming one of one's predecessor's acts, usually donations of land or grants of privileges. Constantine II patronised the monasteries founded by monks from Saint-Victor in Marseille. However, surging Pisan religious houses came into conflict with the Provençal monasteries, while the archbishop of Cagliari came into conflict with not only the archbishop of Pisa, but also Constantine. Nevertheless, the 1150s saw restoration and renovation of sacred art and edifices. Along with Gonario II of Torres and Comita I of Gallura, Constantine pledged fidelity to the archbishop of Pisa. All this suggests strong allegiance to the reformed papacy despite the still near-autonomous status of Cagliari at the time.

== House of Massa and Pisan domination ==
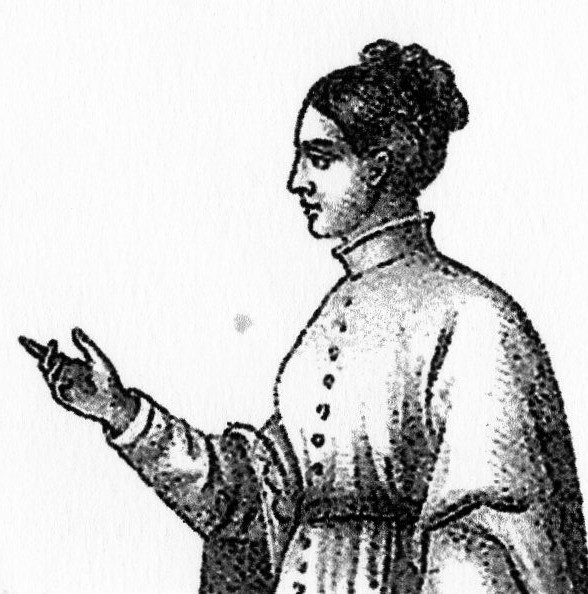
The judgess Benedetta

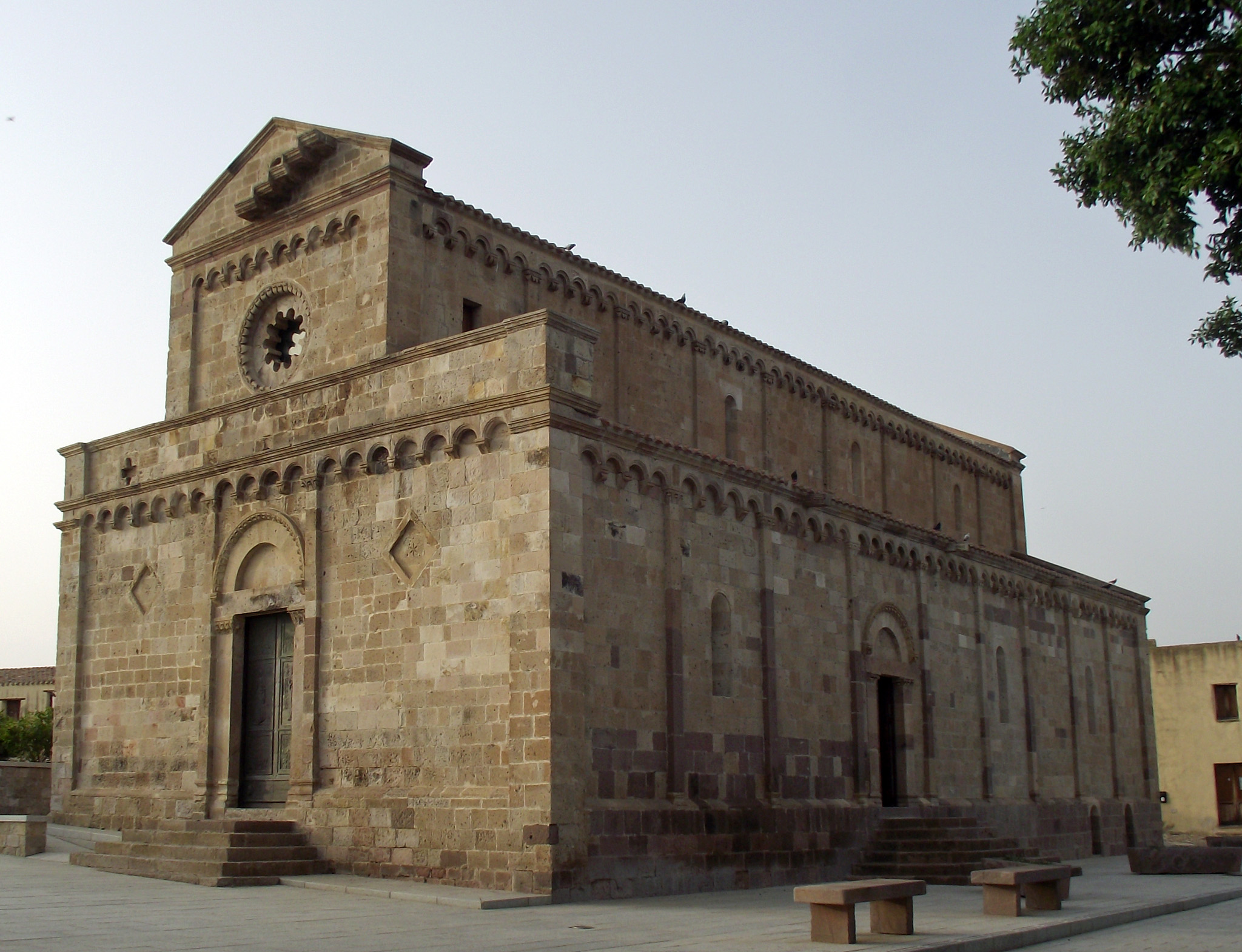
Cathedral of S. Maria of Monserrat, Tratalias

Constantine II's daughter succeeded him with her husband Peter. The Pisans tried to remove him after her death and they sent Obert, Margrave of Massa, to conquer the giudicato. The son of Obert and one of the daughter of Constantine II of Cagliari, William I became then the new judge of Cagliari.

William spent his reign (1188 – 1214) in constant wars with Arborea, Gallura, and Logudoro. He arrested and imprisoned the judge of Arborea, Peter I and ruled Arborea in his name. He tried to conquer Gallura, but was rebuffed by Lamberto Visconti. He was on fairly good terms with the Pisans throughout his career, but on his death, he left only daughters. Benedetta, his heiress, was married to Barisone III of Arborea and thus those two giudicati were united, to be torn apart on his death (1217). Cagliari slowly declined thereafter, as various factions fought for the control of Benedetta. Pisan interference became stronger than ever. In 1256, John tried to throw off the Pisan yoke and allied with the Republic of Genoa, but was assassinated by Pisan agents. John was succeeded by his cousin William III of Cagliari; soon Pisa and the other Giudicati attacked Cagliari besieging Santa Igia. Cagliari lost the war and in 1258 the history of the giudicato came to a sudden close; his territory was partitioned in three parts that were assigned to the Della Gherardesca family, Arborea and Gallura while Pisa maintained the control over Castel di Castro.

== See also ==
- List of judges (judikes) of Cagliari

== Sources ==
- Dizionario Biografico degli Italiani. Rome, 1963 – Present.
- Nowé, Laura Sannia. Dai "lumi" dalla patria Italiana: Cultura letteraria sarda. Mucchi Editore: Modena, 1996.
- Casula, Francesco. "The History of Sardinia." Sardinia Tourist Board. 1989.
- Solmi A., Studi storici sulle istituzioni della Sardegna nel Medioevo, Cagliari 1917.
