= Ubaldo of Gallura =

Ubaldo Visconti

Judge/King of Gallura
- Reign: 1225-1238
- Predecessor: Lamberto
- Successor: John

Judge/King of Logudoro/Torres (jure uxoris)
- Reign: 1236-1238
- Co-ruler: Adelasia
- Born: 1207
- Died: 1238 (aged 30–31); Siligo
- Spouse: Adelasia, Queen of Torres
- House: Visconti (Sardinia branch)
- Father: Lamberto Visconti di Eldizio
- Mother: Elena, Queen of Gallura

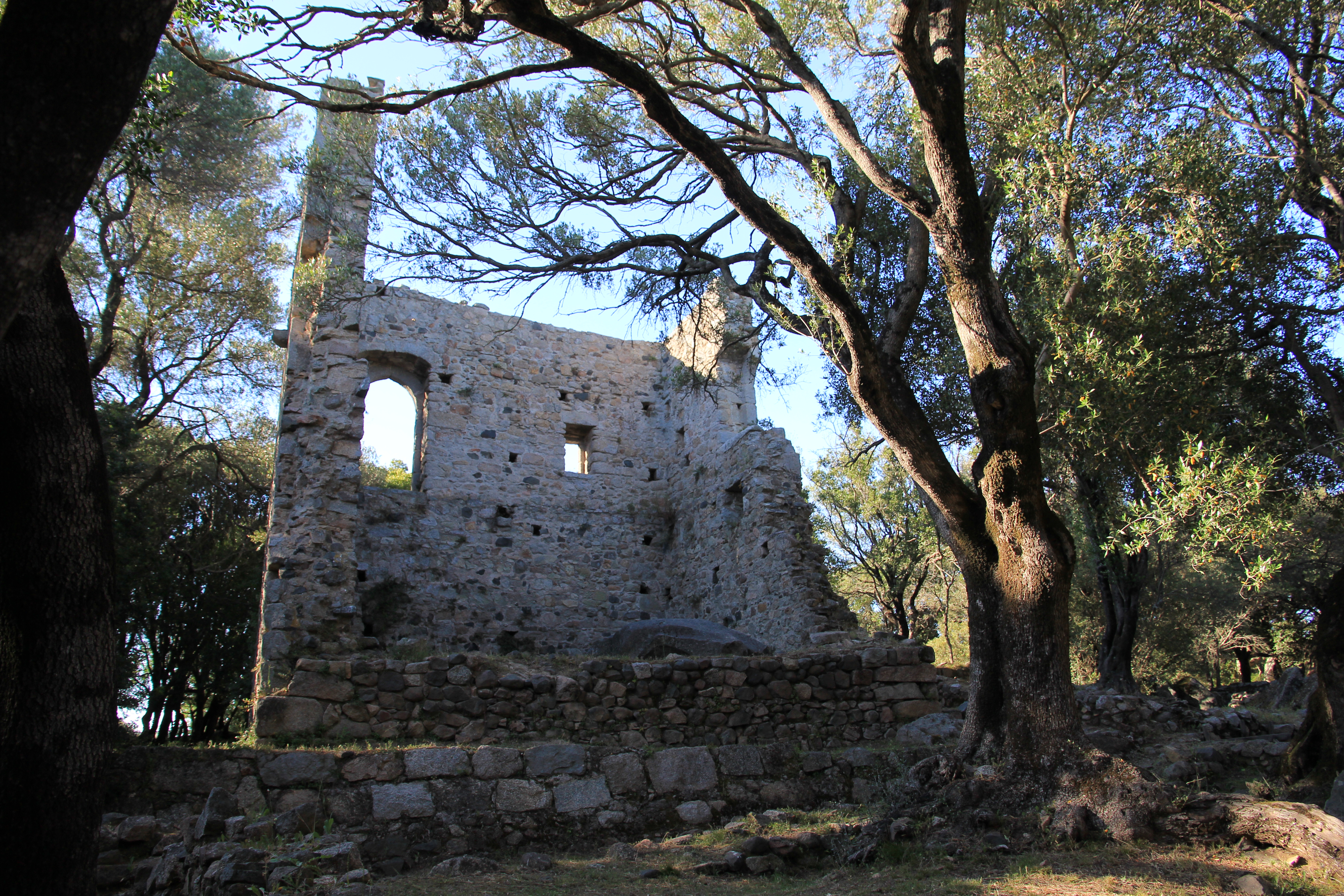
Luogosanto - Palace of Baldu (02).JPG

Ubaldo II Visconti, son of Lamberto di Eldizio and Elena de Lacon, was the Judge of Gallura from 1225 to his death in 1238. He ruled every giudicato on the island of Sardinia at one point or another save Arborea.

By a pact signed November 1218 with Marianus II of Torres, his father secured his marriage to Adelasia, Marianus' eldest child. The marriage was celebrated in 1219. Pope Honorius III, enemy of the Pisans, immediately sent his chaplain Bartolomeo to annul the marriage, but he failed and the pact between Pisa and Logudoro stood.

Ubaldo inherited the Giudicato of Gallura in 1225. In 1230, when his uncle, Ubaldo I Visconti, died, he invaded the giudicato of Cagliari to assure the continued influence of his Pisan family there. He subsequently exercised the regency for Benedetta until 1232.

Marianus died in 1232 and, by his will, was succeeded by his son Barisone III. Upon Barisone's death (1236) without heirs, also as stipulated by Marianus' will, the Logudorese magnates elected one of his daughters, Adelasia or Benedetta, to inherit. They unanimously acclaimed Adelasia, whose husband could well uphold her right. So they in turn elected him judge as well. In 1237, Pope Gregory IX sent his chaplain Alexander to Torres to receive recognition from Adelasia of papal suzerainty. At the palace of Ardara, in the presence of the Camaldolese abbot and monks of S. Trinità di Saccargia, she made the oath of vassalage and Ubaldo affirmed it, giving over the castle of Monte Acuto to the bishop of Ampurias as a guarantee of his good faith. Ubaldo did not, however, recognise any authority over Gallura other than the ancient authority of the Pisan archdiocese.

Ubaldo drew up a will in January 1237 at Silki. His nephew John was nominated to succeed him, but his widow's second husband, Enzo, took control of both Gallura and Logudoro and was granted the title King of Sardinia by his father, the Emperor Frederick II.

== Sources ==
- Ferrabino, Aldo (ed). Dizionario Biografico degli Italiani: I Aaron – Albertucci. Rome, 1960.

Preceded by Lambert	Giudice of Gallura; 1225–1238	Succeeded by John
Preceded by Barison III	Giudice of Logudoro; 1236–1238 with Adelasia	Succeeded by Enzo
Preceded by Ubaldo I	Giudice of Cagliari; 1230–1232 with Benedetta	Succeeded by William II
