= William I of Cagliari =

Sardinian leader

William I Salusio IV

Judge/King of Cagliari
- Reign: 1188-1214
- Predecessor: Peter Torchitorio III
- Successor: Benedetta

Judge/King of Arborea
- Reign: 1195-1206
- Predecessor: Peter I and Hugh I
- Successor: Peter I and Hugh I
- Born: 1160
- Died: 1214 (aged 53–54)
- Spouse: Adelaide Malaspina; Guisiana of Capraia
- Issue: Benedetta, Queen of Cagliari; Agnese of Cagliari, Queen of Torres; Preziosa of Cagliari, Queen of Arborea
- House: Obertenghi
- Father: Oberto, Marquis of Massa
- Mother: Giorgia of Cagliari

The Jydicates of Sardinia.

William I (c. 1160–1214), royal name Salusio IV, was the judike of Cagliari, meaning "King", from 1188 to his death. His descendants and those of his immediate competitors intermarried to form the backbone of the Italian Aristocracy, and ultimately their descendants in the Medici clan are precursors to, and definers of later royalty and claims thereto.

William was an infamous politician and warlord in medieval Sardinia. A member in the medieval Sardinian "Judges", he consolidated his power through both military force and political intrigue. He was a soldier, a military man, and a merchant. He assisted his father in the conquest of Cagliari, and later accompanied his Archbishop (Ubaldo Lanfranchi, Archbishop of Pisa) on the Third Crusade. He claims to have led the force defeating the Visconti in a civil war, only to later hand Pisa back to them while marrying into the Visconti family. Being closely related to many high ranking clerics, he maintained close relations with the papacy until his death. Allegedly, he was a man of some culture, as he was in reportedly in contact with the Provençal troubadours Peire de la Caravana and Peire Vidal, likely to contract their services on behalf of his wealthy patrons.

== Rise to power in Cagliari ==
He was the son of Giorgia, daughter of Constantine II of Cagliari, and Obert, Margrave of Massa. He was a brother of William, Margrave of Massa. His paternal relatives were a branch of the Obertenghi who ruled Massa Lunense from the 11th century. Constantine II's eldest daughter married a younger son of Gonario II of Logudoro. This man, Peter, ruled the giudicato on her behalf (as Torchitorio III) following the death of Constantine. While Constantine, like the Massa, had been a vassal of the Republic of Pisa, Peter transferred his allegiance to the Republic of Genoa. In 1187, open conflict raged over the whole island of Sardinia between the Genoese and their factions and the Pisans and theirs. The Pisans mercilessly assaulted Genoese merchants in Cagliari and despoiled their landed possessions, evicting them from the giudicato. In 1188, Peter was captured and imprisoned, never to be heard of again. By 1190, William was judge in his place. Because of the interval between Peter's known arrest and William's first appearance as judge, some scholars have alleged that William's father, Obert, ruled the giudicato as judge in the intervening period, but this is unsupported by any documentary evidence and is based on arguments from silence. The period of silence may be explained by William's accompaniment on the Third Crusade with Ubaldo, Archbishop of Pisa, a pilgrimage which is referenced in a papal letter of early 1200.

William established his court at Santa Igia and took the regnal name Salusio IV, continuing a tradition of alternation between the two regnal names (Torchitorio and Salusio) and also demolishing the theory that he had had any other predecessor than Torchitorio III. On 7 July 1188, the emissaries (cardinals) of Pope Clement III declared a general peace to be observed on the island. They affirmed Pisan supremacy over Genoese estates and over the giudici. Nevertheless, in June 1191, Constantine II of Logudoro signed a treaty with Genoa. The treaty explicitly called for the maintenance of peace with William.

== War with Logudoro ==
In 1194, William was at war with Constantine over Arborea. He invaded the Giudicato of Logudoro and occupied the frontier castle of Goceano. There he imprisoned Prunisinda, Constantine's Catalan wife, and her entourage. She died the subsequent year at Santa Igia of malnourishment and mistreatment. William received a strong reproof from Pope Innocent III for "dishonouring" Prunisinda.

In 1195, Constantine attacked Santa Igia without success. In March, Constantine induced a peace with William through Pisan mediation. A treaty was signed whereby Prunisinda was to be released and Constantine was reserved the right to pay for the return of Goceano or any castle of equal value. He then requested Pisan intervention to obtain a peace between himself and Peter I of Arborea, William's protégé. The war between the two rulers actually continued until Constantine's death in battle in December 1198. William meanwhile forced Constantine's ally, Hugh I of Arborea, Peter's co-judge, to accept terms and agree to marry Preciosa, his daughter and a relative through of Peter's through her mother.

The Archbishop Ubaldo arrived on the island soon after William's accord with Hugh. Ubaldo confirmed William in his possession of Goceano and had to excommunicate Constantine when he subsequently retook it. William and archbishop intervened forcibly to remove Giusto, Archbishop of Arborea, from his see (because he was Genoese) and send him to Rome. In 1196, Ubaldo extracted an oath of fealty to Pisa out of William.

In 1198, William attacked Arborea again and forced Peter to flee to Hugh. William advanced on Oristano, Arborea's chief port city, and demanded the cession of several frontier castles, including Marmilla, which he obtained. William then captured Peter and his son Barison and imprisoned them in order to control Arborea more directly. He entrusted the government of the giudicato to the bishops, the canons of Oristano, and the majores (major laymen).

Constantine died not too long after his excommunication and was succeeded by Comita III. Comita quickly came to terms with William and Ubaldo, promising to marry his son Marianus II to William's daughter Agnes. Comita was forced by Ubaldo to make an oath recognising him as permanent apostolic legate to the island. It was about this time that Genoese ships landed near Cagliari, William was defeated, and S. Gilla razed. The war turned out to be a mere raid.

== Relations with Pope Innocent ==
On 11 August 1198, Pope Innocent asked the Archbishop of Cagliari, Bishop of Sorres, and the Pisan Bandino, Archbishop-Elect of Torres, to investigate the foundation of the accusations against Giusto. Giusto claimed that Arborea was a fief of the Holy See and that the canons of Oristano had no power to grant the judgeship to William, who had ousted Peter and imprisoned him. The pope put the whole investigation under the guidance and oversight of the clergy of the island.

Around this time, Comita accused William to Pope Innocent of aggression and other breaches of the peace. Arborea came under papal protection. Early in 1200, William requested Peter's half of Arborea, which he already controlled, from the pope. Innocent refused. Unbeknownst to the pope, he had made a secret pact with Hugh whereby he retained control not only of Peter's half of Arborea, but also of all the fortresses in the realm. Innocent replied to William in November or December summoning both William and Comita to Rome to answer the various charges they had launched against one another. The Pisans refused to allow William, a citizen of theirs, to appear in a foreign court on civil charges against another Pisan citizen.

When Barison II of Gallura died in 1203, he left his giudicato under the protection of Pope Innocent, who wrote a letter to Biagio, Archbishop of Torres, charging him with assuring a smooth succession in Gallura, which meant arranging a marriage for the young Elena. The prospect of interference from William of Cagliari, Comita of Logudoro, and Hugh and Peter of Arborea was great.

William took the late judge's widow, Elena, and daughter, also Elena, into his protective custody. When William Malaspina, son of Moroello and brother of his wife Adalasia, entered Gallura with the intent of abducting and marrying the minor Elena, William removed him, much to the praise of the pope, who claimed the right to choose her husband according to the late Barison's will. Nonetheless, a papal letter of 15 September 1203 mentions that William had accorded Malaspina the administration of Gallura and protection of Elena's rights. In that same letter, Innocent admonished William to restrain a relative of his Malaspina and to get him out of Gallura. He was asked to guard Elena from making a poor match and especially to guard her from Ittocorre de Gunale, Comita's brother. Both William and Comita were warned a second time to follow Biagio in the matter. Innocent desired a husband that would not be "suspect" to any of the judges.

Biagio tried to coax an oath of fidelitas to the pope out of William, but the latter claimed that his prior oath to Ubaldo prevented it, even though the earlier oath was made "save the honour of the Holy See." Eventually, in May or June 1205, Innocent asked the archbishop of Pisa to absolve William of his oath, but the archbishop ignored the request. Innocent pleaded again in May 1206.

In July 1204, Innocent thanked William for releasing Barison of Arborea from prison in order for him to marry Benedetta, William's own daughter.

In 1206, William turned his sights on obtaining Gallura by force, but the giudicessa Elena married Lamberto Visconti, who rebuffed his assaults (1207). On 30 October, William and Hugh renewed their pact and the latter finally married Preciosa. Both Hugh and William appear as judges in Arborea, though each with his own clearly delineated zone. In June, Innocent had approved the marriage, but by October 1207, he had reproved Riccus, Archbishop of Cagliari, for approving it.

In September 1211, William asked the pope about the legitimacy of his second marriage, but it was not annulled. In 1213, despite that lack of a formal oath, Innocent considered William to hold his lands in fief from the Holy See. Innocent was in general a supporter and ally of William. He twice wrote favourable about William's economic policies to the Bishop of Florence.

== The Pisan citizen ==
William was a citizen of Pisa and alternatingly passed his time there and at Cagliari. Around 1207, he married his second wife Guisiana, daughter of a Tuscan count at odds with Pisa, Guido Guerra III.

He was in Pisa on 9 November 1210 when his mother founded a hospital beside his own house, near the cathedral. However, even in Pisa he signed a document as Salusio IV de Lacon when granting immunities to San Vito, a Sardinian dependency, on 10 May 1211.

In 1212, there was complete anarchy in Pisa. Various factions were at war. In mid-January 1213, William led the forces of Massa, Pistoia, the anti-Visconti faction in Pisa, and his father-in-law's militia to victory near Massa over the forces of Lucca supported by the Visconti under Ubaldo I, and by the deposed Pisan podestà Goffredo Musto. It was the greatest military accomplishment of William's career and is recounted in the Ritmo lucchese. He assumed control of Massa, which thitherto been in the hands of relatives, and forced Pisa to accept four rectors, one of which was a Visconti.

Late 1213 or early 1214, William died. By May 1214, his daughter Benedetta was in power with her husband, Barison, who took the name Torchitorio IV.

== Family ==
William's first wife was Adelasia (or Adalasia), of the Malaspina family. William's second wife was Guisiana. He left three daughters by her:

- Benedetta, married the aforementioned Barison of Arborea
- Agnes, married the aforementioned Marianus of Logudoro (to seal a treaty returning Goceano to Logudoro)
- Preciosa (or Preziosa), married the aforementioned Hugh of Arborea

== Notes ==
=== Sources ===
- Caravale, Mario (ed). Dizionario Biografico degli Italiani: XXVII Collenuccio – Confortini. Rome, 1982.
- Caravale, Mario (ed). Dizionario Biografico degli Italiani: XXVII Guglielmo Gonzaga – Jacobini. Rome, 2000.
- Moore, John C. (1987). "Pope Innocent III, Sardinia, and the Papal State". Speculum. 62 (1): 81–101. doi:10.2307/2852567. JSTOR 2852567. S2CID 162788264.
- Solmi, A. "Un nuovo documento per la storia di Guglielmo di Cagliari e l'Arborea." Archivio storico sardi. VI. (1908), pp 193–212.
- Oliva, A. M. "Guglielmo di Massa. «Al pro marques de Sardenha, qu'ab joi viu et ab sen renha»." Gli Obertenghi di Massa e della Lunigiana ed i Regno della Sardegna, secoli 12.–14. pp 85–108. M. G. Armanini et al.: Pisa, 1999.
- Petrucci, S. Re in Sardegna, a Pisa cittadini. Bologna, 1988.
- Baudi di Vesme, Benedetto. "Guglielmo di Cagliari e l'Arborea." Archivio storico sardo. I. (1905), pp 12–51, 173–209.

Preceded by Torchitorio III	Judge of Cagliari; 1193–1214	Succeeded by Torchitorio IV
