= Barisone III of Torres =

Barisone III

Judge/King of Logudoro/Torres
- Reign: 1232-1236
- Predecessor: Marianus II
- Successor: Adelasia
- Born: 1221; Ardara
- Died: 1236 (aged 14–15); Sorso
- Barisone de Lacon-Gunale
- House: Lacon-Gunale
- Father: Marianus II, King of Torres
- Mother: Agnes of Cagliari

Barisone III (also Barison or Barusone; 1221–1236) was briefly the Giudice of Logudoro from 1232 until his death. He was the only son of Marianus II, whom he succeeded.

The nobility opposed to the Visconti family chose Orzocco de Serra as regent. Barisone was assassinated at Sorso by a peasant revolt instigated by the pro-Genoese faction of the nobility, the Doria and the Malaspina.

According to Marianus' will, should Barisone die without and heir, the magnates of the realm should elect one of his sisters, either Adelasia or Benedetta. Barisone did die without heirs and Adelasia was elected to succeed him.

== Sources ==
- Ghisalberti, Alberto M. (ed) Dizionario Biografico degli Italiani: I Aaron – Albertucci. Rome, 1960.

Preceded by Marianus II	Giudice of Logudoro; 1232–1236	Succeeded by Adelasia
