= Peter I of Arborea =

Peter I

Judge/King of Arborea
- 1st reign: 1185–1195
- Predecessor: Barisone I/II
- Successor: William I Salusio IV
- Co-monarch: Hugh I (1192–1195)
- 2nd reign: 1206-1214
- Born: Oristano, Sardinia
- Died: 1206 or 1214; Oristano or Pisa
- Spouse: Bina [Jacobina]
- Issue: Barisone II Torchitorio IV, King of Arborea and Cagliari
Names
- Peter de Serra
- House: Lacon-Gunale (Serra branch)
- Father: Barisone I/II
- Mother: Pellegrina of Lacon

The Judicates of Sardinia.

Peter I (died 1214), of the Serra family, was the eldest son and successor of Barisone II of Arborea, reigning from 1186 to his death. His mother was Barisone's first wife, Pellegrina de Lacon. He was crowned King of Sardinia, the title his father had used, with the support of a majority of the Arborean nobility.

Immediately after his father's death, he was opposed by his nephew Hugh, the son of Hugh I of Bas and Ispella, Peter's half-sister, the elder daughter of Barisone by his second wife, the Catalan Agalbursa. Agalbursa had the support of Alfonso II of Aragon, but she died soon after instigating the war between her grandson and Peter. Peter was supported by the Republic of Pisa, while Hugh had the backing of the Republic of Genoa. In 1189, however, Peter made peace with Genoa and swore fealty to the Republic salva domini pape fidelitate. In 1192, a compromise was finally reached at Oristano whereby Arborea was divided between Peter and Hugh (Treaty of Oristano).

In the late 1190s, Constantine II of Logudoro and his son Comita III, allies of Genoa, warred with Peter, who was under the protection of William I of Cagliari. Comita eventually sued for peace with Pisa and abandoned his claims over Arborea in exchange for the castle of Goceano, held thitherto by William. In 1195, William of Cagliari invaded Arborea, imprisoning Peter and besieging Oristano, forcing Hugh to sign a pact ceding his territories and to marry Preciosa, his daughter and a relative of Peter through her mother.

In 1198, William attacked Arborea again and forced Peter to flee to Hugh. William advanced on Oristano and demanded the cession of several frontier castles, including Marmilla, which he obtained. William then captured Peter and his son Barisone and imprisoned them in order to control Arborea more directly. He entrusted the government of the Judicate to the bishops, the canons of Oristano, and the majores (major laymen). Pope Innocent III, in a letter of 11 August, launched an investigation of the church's participation in this usurpation, which Giusto, Archbishop of Arborea, claimed the canons of Oristano had no authority to effect.

Early in 1200, William of Cagliari requested Peter's half of Arborea, which he already controlled, from the pope. Innocent refused. Unbeknownst to the pope, he had made a secret pact with Hugh whereby he retained control not only of Peter's half of Arborea, but also of all the fortresses in the realm.

When Barisone II of Gallura died in 1203, he left his Judicate under the protection of Pope Innocent, who penned a letter to Biagio, Archbishop of Torres, charging him with assuring a smooth succession in Gallura, which meant arranging a marriage for the young heiress Elena. Innocent advised the judges not to interefer with her marriage and to aid Biagio in everything.

Peter died a prisoner in Pisa and his son Barisone inherited his half of Arborea, after being freed from imprisonment to marry William's heiress, Benedetta. His wife had been Bina (1189), mother of his only legitimate son Barisone (1190), but they were divorced in 1191. She remarried to Ugo degli Alberti of the Capraia family in 1193. Peter also had an illegitimate son named Gotifred, who died in 1253.

== Notes ==
=== Sources ===
- Moore, John C. (1987). "Pope Innocent III, Sardinia, and the Papal State". Speculum. 62 (1): 81–101. doi:10.2307/2852567. JSTOR 2852567. S2CID 162788264.

Preceded by Barisone II	Judge of Arborea; 1186–1214	Succeeded by Barisone III
