= Castle of San Michele =

Medieval castle in Cagliari, Sardinia, Italy

- Castello di San Michele
- Cagliari
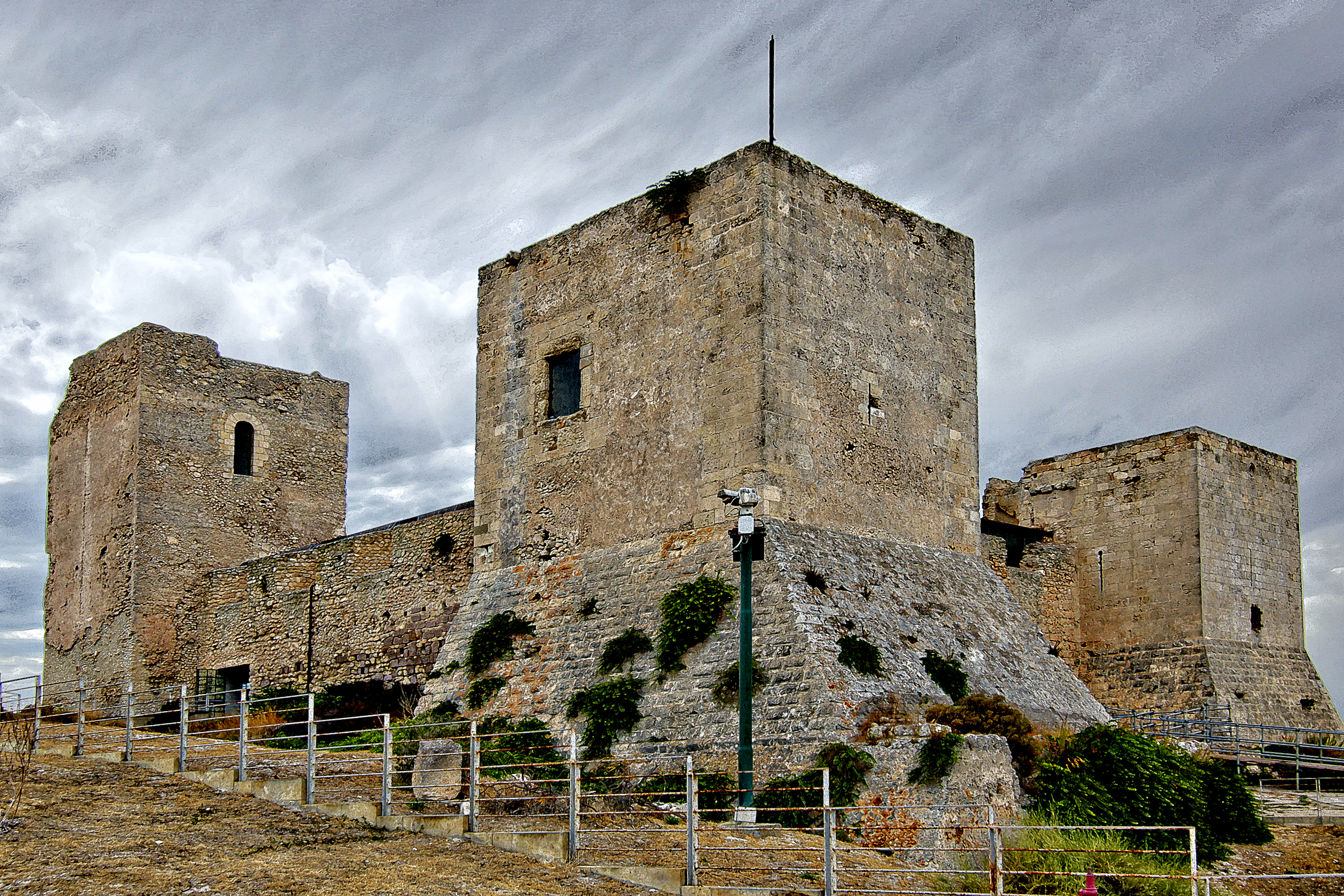
- Castle in Cagliari

Site information
- Type: Castle

Location
- Coordinates: 39.244776°N 9.109702°E

Site history
- Built: 12th century

The Castle of San Michele (Italian: Castello di San Michele) (Sardinian: Casteddu de Santu Miali) is a medieval castle in Cagliari, the capital of Sardinia, Italy.

== History ==
The 1990s excavations have revealed the remains of a rural church, probably of the early medieval period, upon which was built the castle in the 12th century to defend the city of Santa Igia, the capital of the Giudicato of Cagliari. The chronology however is still uncertain: the date of construction of the castle it is doubtful as it is not clear if the church, now part of the structure, had been built before or simultaneously the castle.

The military complex has three towers and a moat surrounding the building. The most important period of the Castle is undoubtedly that between 14th and the 16th centuries, when it was inhabited by the Carroz family, a noble family from Valencia.

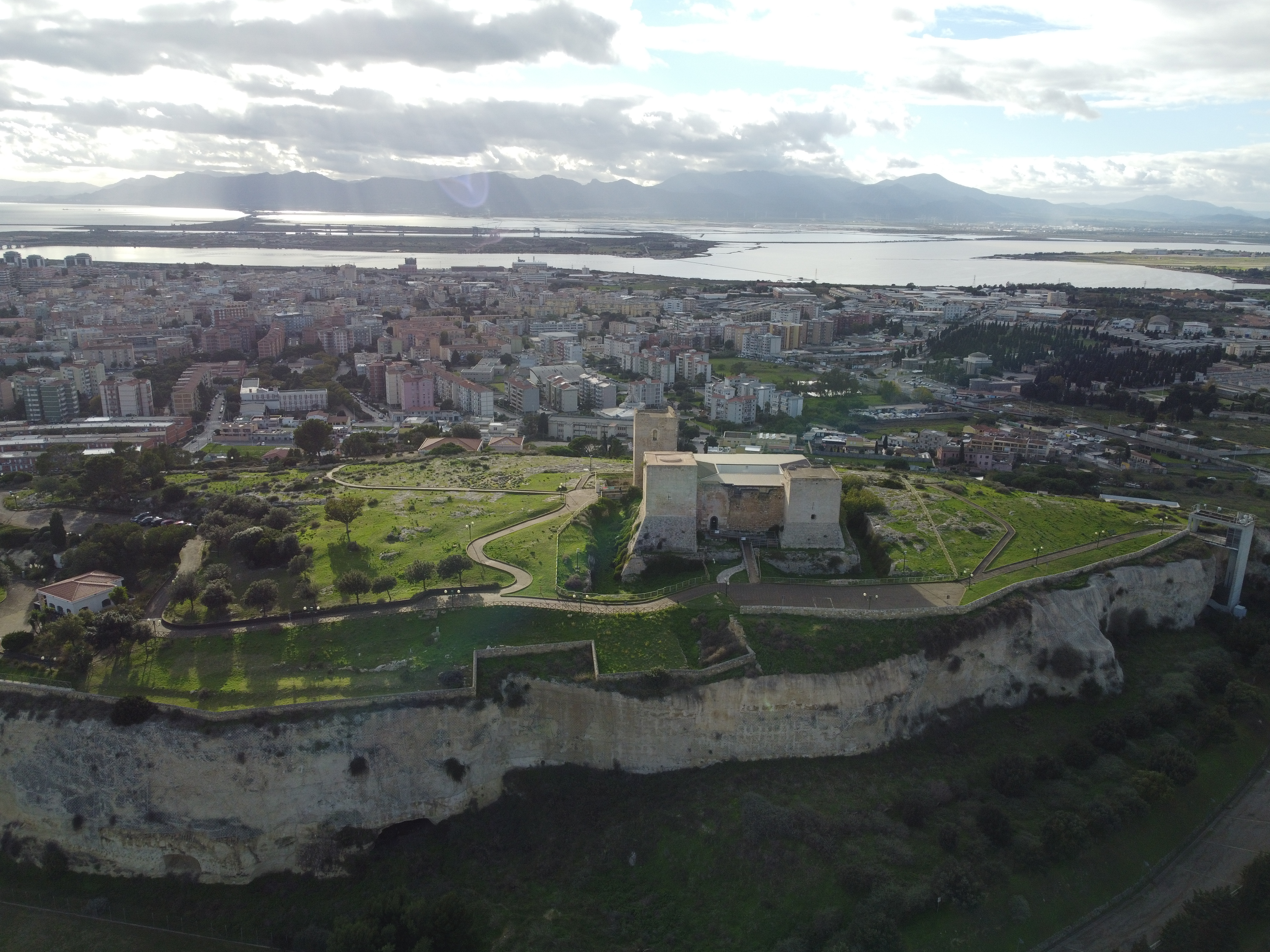
Aerial view

Later it was abandoned and used as a hospital during the so-called "Plague of Saint Efisio" (1652-1656). It was again fortified for prevent French attacks in the 18th centuries. Around 1940, it was occupied by the Regia Marina (Italian Navy) and later become proprierty of the comune of Cagliari. The castle has undergone a substantial modifications and now is used as a Center of Art and Culture.

== Sources ==
- G. Spano, Guida della città e dintorni di Cagliari, Cagliari, A. Timon, 1861, pp. 366–367
- R. Carta Raspi, Castelli medioevali di Sardegna, Cagliari, 1933, p. 34;
- F. Fois, "Il castello di San Michele", in Almanacco di Cagliari, 1976
- G. Spiga, Il castello di San Michele sentinella di Santa Igia?, Pisa, 1983
- G. Anedda, Il castello di San Michele a Cagliari, Cagliari, 1984
- F. Fois, Castelli della Sardegna medioevale, B. Fois (editor), Cinisello Balsamo, Amilcare Pizzi, 1992, pp. 41–47
