= Benedetta of Cagliari =

Judge of Cagliari

Benedetta

Judge/Queen of Cagliari
- Reign: 1214-1233
- Predecessor: William I Salusio IV
- Successor: William II Salusio V
- Co-monarch: Barisone Torchitorio IV (1214-17)

Judge/Queen consort of Arborea
- Tenure: 1214-1217
- Monarch: Barisone Torchitorio IV
- Born: 1194; Santa Igia
- Died: 1233 (aged 38–39); Massa
- Spouse: Barisone Torchitorio IV, Co-King of Cagliari; Lamberto, King of Gallura; Enrico de Cepola; Rinaldo de Glandis
- Issue: William II Salusio V Mary of Cagliari
- House: Obertenghi
- Father: William I Salusio IV
- Mother: Adelaide Malaspina

Benedetta (c. 1194 – 1232/33) was the daughter and heiress of William I of Cagliari and Adelasia, daughter of Moroello Malaspina. She succeeded her father in January or February 1214.

She was consecrated in 1214 by Riccus, Archbishop of Cagliari, in the presence of the higher clergy and the grandees. She swore an oath not to diminish the territory of the giudicato, nor to alienate its castles, nor to make foreign alliances without their consent. Then, on 14 June, she married Barisone III of Arborea, son of Peter I, who was imprisoned by her father. He took the dynastic name "Torchitorio V" and they ruled their two giudicati jointly, each being cited in the acts of the other in their own giudicato. Then, Benedetta made homage to the Holy See.

With Archbishop Riccus, the bishop of Sulcis, and her husband, she made many donations to the churches of S. Giorgio di Suelle and the church of Sulcis. Benedetta favoured natives over Pisans for positions in her government and preferred to cultivate the economy of Sardinia than that of the Republic of Pisa. In 1215, the wrath of Pisa fell on her.

In that year, Lambert Visconti, then judge of Gallura, landed a large army near Cagliari and took the dominating hilltop of S. Gilla, fortifying it. Benedetta was subsequently forced to flee her capital for the interior. In June 1216, she made a donation to the cathedral of Pisa in hopes of procuring their support, but in 1217, Lambert's brother, Ubald I Visconti, forced her to accept terms surrendering Cagliari. She received the giudicato back as fief from the consul of Pisa. However, violence between Sardinians and Pisans escalated in Cagliari and Benedetta and Barisone made an alliance with Comita III of Torres and the Republic of Genoa in hopes of expelling the Pisans.

In her opposition to Pisa, however, Benedetta found support in Pope Honorius III. In February 1217, he annulled the election of the Pisan Marianus, then bishop of Suelli, to the archdiocese of Cagliari. In his place he sent Ugolino dei Conti, Cardinal Bishop of Ostia and Apostolic Legate to Corsica and Sardinia. He also urged Milan to aid Marianus II of Torres. In that spring, Barisone died and in 1218 Ubald arranged for his widow to contract a new marriage with the widowered Lambert, her one-time conqueror, in hopes of bringing peace to Cagliari. On 9 April 1220, the two were married, but the pope immediately pronounced his annulment.

In December 1224, Benedetta renewed the oath of homage to the Holy See to Goffredo, the papal legate. She agreed to pay an annual tribute of twenty pounds of silver to the Holy See and not to contract any other marriage without papal approval and blessing. If she were to die without heirs, the pope would inherit Cagliari. The following years were ones of peace. In 1225–1226, Benedetta included her son William in several donations to various churches. But in the latter year, war began anew with Lambert's heir, Ubaldo II.

In the following years, in order to protect herself from Ubaldo, she married twice more, both times without papal permission. Her third husband (1227) was Enrico di Ceola, a Pisan of the Capraia family who soon gained papal favour. Her fourth husband was Rinaldo de Glandis and their marriage was declared valid. Nevertheless, violence in Cagliari forced her to move to the castle of Santa Igia and then to Massa, her ancestral home. There she died, late 1232 or early 1233. By February 1233, Pope Gregory IX had given Massa and Potenzolo to Ugo di Procaria, while Cagliari was divided between the Visconti, Capraia, and Donoratico, Pisan families. Her heir was William. He reigned, but never ruled. Her sister Agnes and her husband, the aforementioned Marianus of Torres, held the regency.

== Sources ==
- Moore, John C. "Pope Innocent III, Sardinia, and the Papal State." Speculum, Vol. 62, No. 1. (Jan., 1987), pp 81–101.
- Ghisalberti, Alberto M. Dizionario Biografico degli Italiani: VIII Bellucci – Beregan. Rome, 1966.
- Solmi, A. Studi storici sulle istituzioni della Sardegna nel Medioevo. Cagliari, 1917.
- Loddo Canepa, F. "Note sulle condizioni economiche e giuridiche degli abitanti di Cagliari dal secolo XI al XIX." Studi sardi. X–XI, 1952, pp 237ff.

Preceded by William I	Judge of Cagliari; 1214–1232	Succeeded by William II
