= Judge of Cagliari =

The Judicates of Sardinia.

The kings or judges (iudices or judikes) of Cagliari were the local rulers of the south of Sardinia during the Middle Ages. Theirs was the largest kingdom and contested the supremacy on the island with that of Logudoro during the 11th and 12th centuries. It was often an ally of the Republic of Pisa and an early supporter of Western monasticism.

The first, native dynasty originated from two clans, the Salusio de Lacon (Salusius, rarely Salucio) and the Torchitorio de Ugunale (Torcotorius). In honour of those two names, dynasts — and later their successors, the houses of Torres (1163) and Massa (1188) — traditionally adopted a regnal name, alternating between Salusio and Torchitorio.

Since the 9th century, the capital was Santa Igia.

== List of kings ==
- ???? – 1058 Salusio I (Marianus I)
- 1058 – 1089 Torchitorio I (Orzocorre)
- 1089 – 1102 Salusio II (Constantine I)
- 1102 – 1130 Torchitorio II (Marianus II)
- 1130 – 1163 Salusio III (Constantine II)
- 1163 – 1188 Torchitorio III (Peter)
- 1188 – 1214 Salusio IV (William I)
- 1214 – 1232 Benedetta
- 1214 – 1217 Torchitorio IV (Barisone II)
- 1232 – 1250 Salusio V (William II)
- 1250 – 1256 Torchitorio V (John)
- 1256 – 1258 Salusio VI (William III)

Partitioned among Pisa, the Gherardeschi, Arborea, and Gallura.
