= Judicate of Gallura =

Medieval kingdom in Sardinia

Judicate of Gallura Iudicatus Gallurae Gallura
- 11th century–1296
- Flag Coat of arms

- Gallura
- Capital: Civita
- Common languages: Sardinian, Latin
- Religion: Roman Catholic
- Government: Judicate (kingdom)
- Judge
  - 1020 - 1040: Manfred of Gallura
  - 1200 - 1225: Elena of Gallura
  - 1276 - 1296: Nino Visconti
- History
  - Established: 11th century
  - Disestablished: 1296
Preceded by	Succeeded by
Byzantine Empire	Republic of Pisa

The Judicate of Gallura (Latin: Iudicatus Gallurae, Sardinian: Judicadu de Gallura, Italian: Giudicato di Gallura) was one of four Sardinian judicates in the Middle Ages. These were independent states whose rulers bore the title iudex, judge. Gallura, a name which comes from gallus, meaning rooster (cock), was subdivided into ten curatoriae governed by curatores under the judge. In the 13th century, the arms of Gallura contained a rooster.

Gallura encompasses the northeast region of the island, with its main city at Olbia. The first iudices of Gallura only appear in the historical record late in the eleventh century, though certain rulers of earlier periods are known. Gallura, like all the other Sardinian kingdoms, initially owed allegiance to the Archdiocese of Pisa, but unlike most of the others it remained relatively steadfast in its support of Pisa, probably due to its proximity to the city of Pisa itself. For this reason, it was often in alliance with the Kingdom of Cagliari in the south.

== Origins ==
Gallura began as a province of the Eastern Roman or Byzantine Empire. After the Arab conquest of Sicily in 827 AD, Sardinia was effectively cut off from regular communication with the imperial government in Constantinople. Unable to receive instruction or support from the empire, the provincial Byzantine magistrates, who were known as iudices (meaning "judges"; the Latin word evolved into the medieval Sardinian "Judicados"), continued to rule autonomously. By the 9th Century a single archontate was formed to govern the entire island, still nominally a byzantine province. It's theorized that familiares of the archon were established as dignitaries in the Sardinian provinces. Those dignitaries what were initially appointed, perhaps even elected, positions in Gallura eventually evolved into hereditary ones by the 11th century.

From the mid-ninth to the early eleventh centuries, little is known at all about Gallura, but around 1050 appears a figure named Manfred who was certainly not the first independent ruler (that appears to be one Baldo). Modern theories generally assume that these early rulers were Pisan governors sent by the Republic. In a letter of Pope Gregory VII dated 1074, he refers to Constantine I of Gallura, probably a member of the Gherardeschi clan. There are legends surrounding Constantine's relationship with the powerful Corsican lords of Cinarca. Whatever his relationship to his predecessors and successors, the dynasty which was to dominate Gallura in the early twelfth century comes into view only around 1100, when the Pisans were expelled by the Thori dynasty, which sat on the throne through Torchitorio I.

== Twelfth century ==
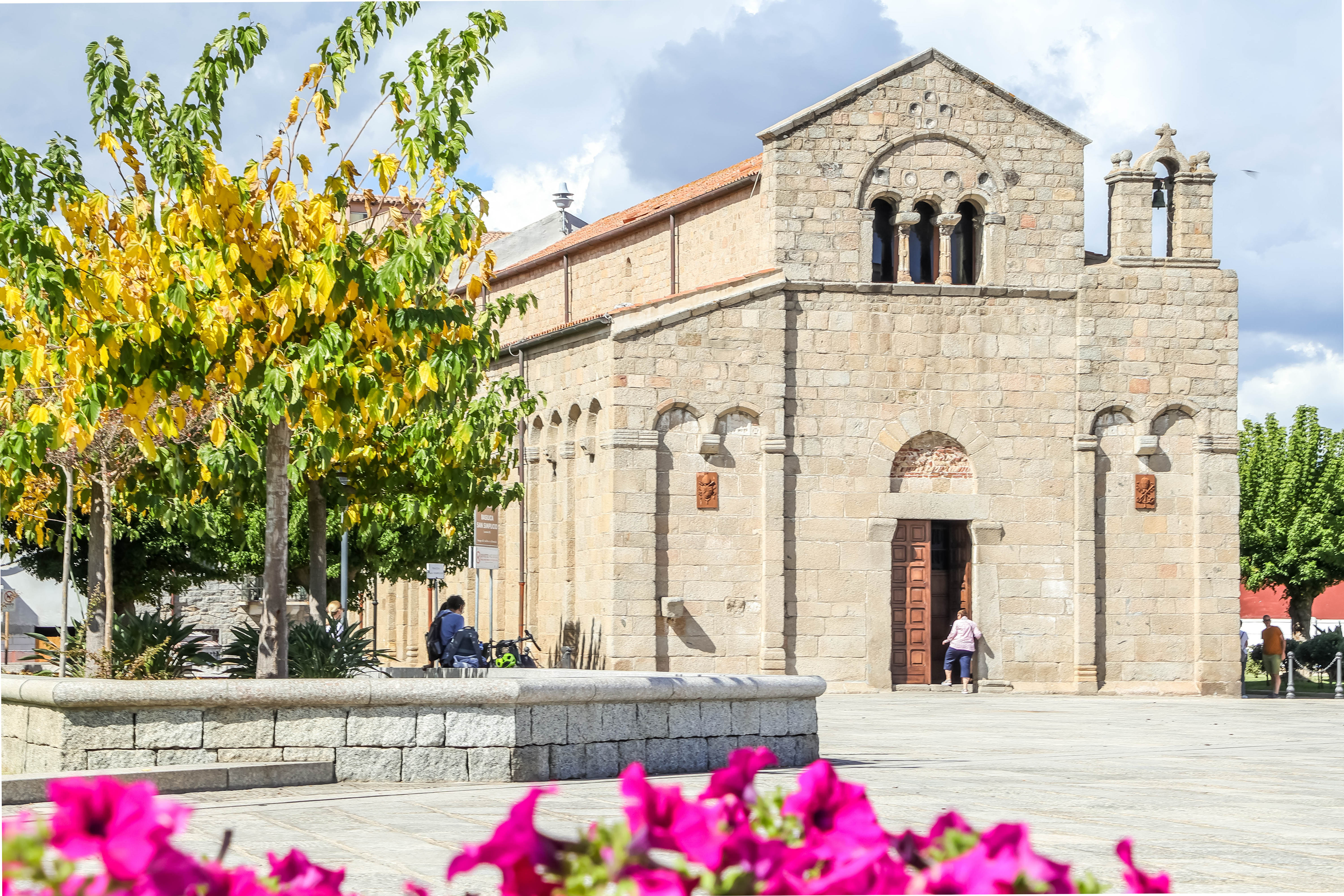
Church of Saint Simplicius at Olbia, constructed in the 12th century.

The last decades of the eleventh century and the opening ones of the twelfth were dominated in Italy and Germany by the Gregorian reforms and the Investiture Controversy, among other attempts to restructure church-state relations. The popes, through Pisan archbishops, sought to extend their authority directly over Sardinia. In this they were aided by various monastic movements — including the Benedictine, Camaldolese, Vallombrosan, and Cassinese sects — which were supported by the iudices. These monks introduced important economic, agricultural, technological, artistic, ecclesiastic, and social advancements, developments, and transformations in Sardinia.

The reign of Torgodorio's son, Saltaro, was briefly interrupted for three years by Ittocorre de Gunale, but the dynasty was restored by Constantine II, who was succeeded by Comita I. Around 1130, Comita joined Gonario II of Torres and Constantine I of Arborea in paying homage to the Pisan archdiocese. On 26 June 1132, Comita went to Ardara, the judicial palace of the Giudicato of Logudoro, to do homage directly to Archbishop Roger and thus confirmed the supremacy of the Logudorese giudicato. The ties to Pisa were re-established and they were to endure. Comita was succeeded by Constantine III, probably a son of Ittocorre and thus the first Gallurese iudex of the Lacon dynasty.

== Thirteenth century ==
Constantine was succeeded by his son Barisone II, who left an only daughter, Elena, in 1203. This opened Gallura to a succession crisis as rival factions sought the hand of Elena in marriage. William Malaspina tried to marry her, but Pope Innocent III forbade it. In 1206, William I of Cagliari invaded Gallura. Finally, in 1207, Elena married the Pisan Lamberto Visconti. Lamberto repulsed the invasion and secured Gallura in the Pisan fold.

In 1211, Comita III of Torres confirmed a treaty with the Republic of Genoa, Pisa's traditional rival for Sardinian influence, whereby the two powers — Logudoro and Genoa — jointly conquered the entire island and put it under Genoese suzerainty with Comita as judge. They first invaded Gallura because of its strong Pisan connection. In 1212, Pisa struck back, but it was not until William of Cagliari's death in 1214 that Gallura was able to defeat Comita and Genoa and force them to terms on land. A naval war continued until Pope Honorius III forced a treaty on the parties on 1 December 1217.

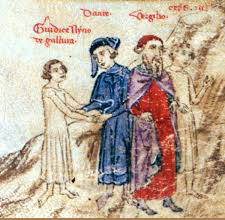
Judge Nino Visconti with Dante Alighieri and Virgilius

After Elena's death, Lamberto continued to rule Gallura and eventually married the heiress of Cagliari, ruling both giudicati until his death in 1225. He was succeeded by his son Ubaldo in Gallura and by his brother Ubaldo in Cagliari. When the elder Ubaldo died, the younger tried to take over Cagliari but failed. In 1236, Logudoro was finally acquired by marriage to Adelasia. Ubaldo died in 1238 and his widow married Enzio, illegitimate son of Frederick II, Holy Roman Emperor. Enzio took up the royal title over all Sardinia, but Ubaldo's son John succeeded him in Gallura, passing his time back and forth between the island and Pisa. This was also the habit of his son and successor, Nino. Following the Battle of Meloria, a disaster for Pisa, in 1284, Nino tried to take power in the city, but was ousted and deposed from Gallura in 1287. This marked the end of the Visconti rule in Gallura which had begun in 1207.

Pisa annexed Gallura and held it until the Aragonese conquest in 1323 – 1324. Nino's only daughter, Joanna, continued to claim her rights until her death in 1339, at which point the title to Gallura passed to the Visconti of Milan, who ceded it to the Crown of Aragon.

== Historiography ==
The history of Gallura is based on slender documentation, almost all of it assembled in the archives of Pisa and Genoa and viewing Arborea and the other Sardinian kingdoms through a colonial lens. The evaluation of political figures has traditionally been made on the basis of military accomplishment, whereas Nowé points out that the ecclesiastical policy of the rulers of Sardinia was just as important in determining the stability, peacefulness, and long-term success of the judicados in the face of colonialism.

== Sources ==
- Dizionario Biografico degli Italiani. Rome, 1963 – Present.
- Nowé, Laura Sannia. Dai "lumi" dalla patria Italiana: Cultura letteraria sarda. Mucchi Editore: Modena, 1996.
- Fara, G. B. De rebus Sardois. Turin, 1835.
