= Elena of Gallura =

Elena

Judge/Queen of Gallura
- Reign: 1203–1218
- Predecessor: Barisone
- Successor: Lamberto
- Co-monarch: Lamberto (from 1207)
- Born: 1190; Olbia
- Died: 1218 (aged 27–28)
- Spouse: Lamberto Visconti
- Issue: Ubaldo, King of Gallura
Names
- Elena de Lacon-Gunale
- House: Lacon-Gunale
- Father: Barisone, King of Gallura
- Mother: Elena de Lacon

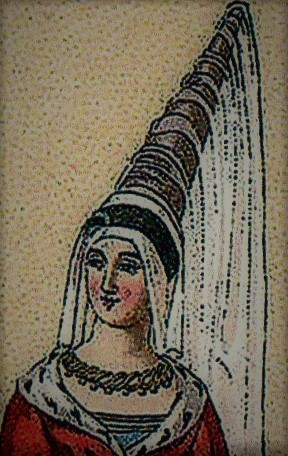
Giudicessa Elena di Gallura.jpg

Elena (c. 1190–1218) was the daughter and successor of Barisone II of Gallura and was named after her mother Odolina of the Lacon family. First queen regnant in Sardinia, she ruled Gallura from the death of her father until her own death, though she was eclipsed by her husband after 1207.

When Barisone died in 1202 or 1203, he left Elena and the giudicato under the protection of Pope Innocent III, who wrote a letter to Biagio, Archbishop of Torres, charging him with assuring a smooth succession in Gallura, which meant arranging a marriage for the young Elena. The prospect of interference from William I of Cagliari, Comita III of Logudoro, and Hugh I and Peter I of Arborea was great enough to incite a second letter to those judges, in which the pope told them to respect Biagio's authority in the matter. On 15 September 1203, Innocent admonished William to restrain a relative of his (the margrave William Malaspina) who was seeking Elena's hand and to get him out of Gallura. He was asked to guard Elena from making a poor match and especially to guard her from Ittocorre de Gunale, her presumed grandfather. Ittocorre was the cousin, possibly brother, of Comita of Logudoro, and the father of her father Constantine III. Both William and Comita were warned a second time to follow Biagio in the matter. Innocent desired a husband that would not be "suspect" to any of the judges.

In July 1204, Innocent wrote to Elena commending her for abiding by papal advice and admonishing her mother, Riccus, Archbishop of Cagliari, and the people of Gallura to follow the decision of Biagio. The bishop of Cività, the Gallurese capital, was sent to Rome to receive papal instruction concerning the marriage prospects. William of Cagliari intervened again to remove a suitor, a certain unnamed margrave.

On 11 May 1206, Elena was informed that she would be marrying Trasimondo, a cousin of the pope's. In August, Innocent sent letters ordering the Sardinian episcopacy to go through with the marriage. Elena, however, refused him and instead married a Pisan named Lamberto Visconti di Eldizio.

Elena died around 1218, when Lambert was engaged to Benedetta of Cagliari. Her son Ubaldo II Visconti later succeeded to the Gallurese throne.

== Sources ==
- Ghisalberti, Aldo (ed). Dizionario Biografico degli Italiani: X Biagio – Boccaccio. Rome, 1968.
- Moore, John C. "Pope Innocent III, Sardinia, and the Papal State." Speculum, Vol. 62, No. 1. (Jan., 1987), pp 81–101.
- Murineddu, Antonio. Gallura. Cagliari: Fossataro, 1962.

Preceded by Barisone II	Giudicessa of Gallura; 1203 – c. 1218	Succeeded by Lambert
