= Ritmo lucchese =

The Ritmo lucchese is an anonymous vernacular poem in a Tuscan koiné. It is reckoned one of the earliest pieces of Italian literature, composed in or shortly after 1213. It records a battle between Lucca and Pisa near Massa fought in mid-January that year. The Pisans opposed to the Visconti, along with the Massans and the Pistoiese, were led by William I of Cagliari and his father-in-law, Guido Guerra III, while the Luccans, along with a Pisan faction, were led by Ubaldo I Visconti and the deposed Pisan podestà Goffredo Musto.

The Ritmo is preserved in manuscript of Burgundio of Pisa's Latin translation of Nemesius' De natura hominis, now codex 45 in the library of the Collegio di Spagna at the University of Bologna. It was discovered by Francesco Filippini and first published by Amedeo Crivellucci (Studi storici, XXII, 2). It was studied by Giovanni Dinelli in "Una battaglia tra Pisani e Lucchesi presso Massa in una cantilena storica in volgare del principio del sec. XIII" (Giornale storico della Lunigiana, VI [1915], fasc. 5, 201ff).

== Editions ==
- In "Ritmo volgare lucchese del 1213. Vincenzo de Bartholomaeis. Città di Castello: Casa Editrice S. Lapi, 1914.
- In Rime giullaresche e popolari d'Italia. Vincenzo de Bartholomaeis, ed. Bologna: Zanichelli, 1926.
