= Agugliastra =

Agugliastra or Ogliastra was an administrative subdivision of Pisan and Aragonese Sardinia.

== History ==
The territory of Ogliastra, part of the Judicate of Cagliari as a curatoria until 1258 and then of the Judicate of Gallura (1288) and the Republic of Pisa (1288–1324), constituted until the Aragonese conquest of Sardinia an important area of influence of Pisa which included all the eastern coast of the island.

During the Pisan domination and the subsequent Aragonese rule, Ogliastra's territory was often incorrectly named "Judicate of Ogliastra" or Ollaste.
