= Barisone II of Arborea =

Barisone II & I
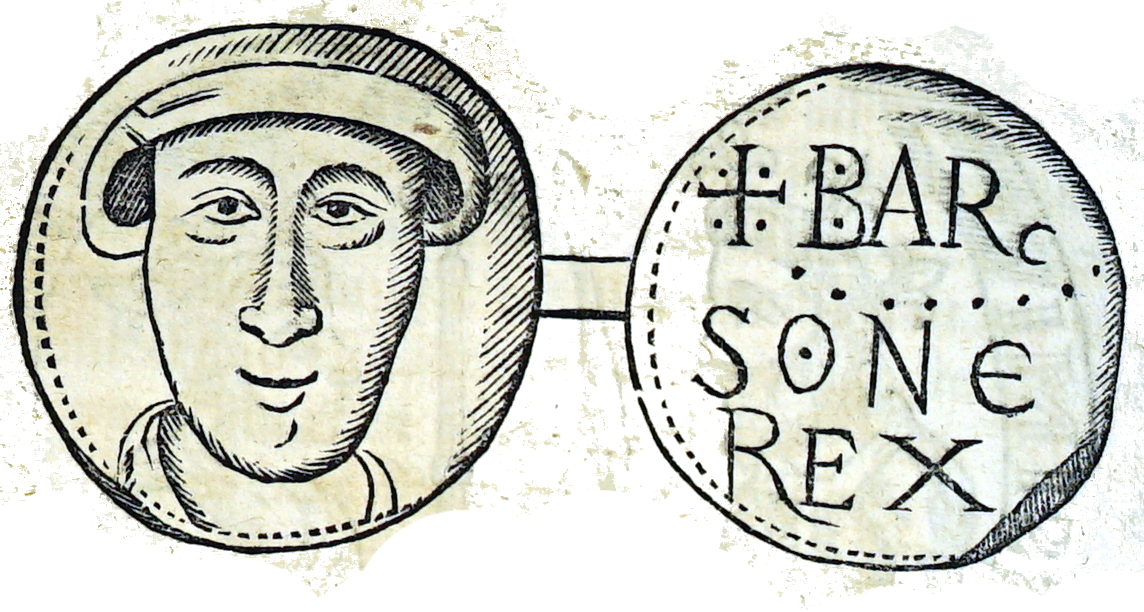
- Reproduction of a seal of the monarch, now lost.

Judge/King of Arborea
- Reign: 1146–1186
- Predecessor: Comita II/III
- Successor: Pietro I

King of Sardinia
- Reign: 1164–1165
- Successor: Vacant; Next holder: Enzo of Sardinia
- Born: Oristano, Sardinia
- Died: 1186; Oristano or Pisa
- Spouse: Pellegrina of Lacon; Agalbursa of Bas-Cervera
- Issue: See list: Pietro, King of Arborea; Barisone Adorno; Sinispella of Arborea, Queen of Torres; Susanna
Names
- Barisone de Serra
- House: Lacon-Gunale (Serra branch)
- Father: Comita II/III, King of Arborea
- Mother: Elena of Orrubu
- Religion: Catholicism

The four Judicates.

Barison II or Barisone II was the "Judge" (standing approximately for "King") of Arborea, one of the four Judicates of Sardinia, from 1146 to 1186. He was the son of Comita II and Elena de Orrubu. His reign was groundbreaking in Sardinia history. It saw the birth of Catalan influence, the escalation of the Genoese-Pisan conflict, and the first royal investiture over the entire island when Barisone was briefly recognised as King of Sardinia by the Holy Roman Emperor from 1164 to 1165.

Barisone was born sometime early in the twelfth century. He may have been associated in the Judicate with his father from an unknown date. He succeeded immediately on his father's death. In his early years, he was on good terms with Pisa and at peace with the church. He attended the consecration ceremony of Santa Maria di Bonarcado with most of the Arborean clergy and Villano, Archbishop of Pisa, his overlord. He donated land from his demesne to the church.

His reign became interesting when, in 1157, he repudiated his first wife, Pellegrina de Lacon, of an old and noble island family, and married Agalbursa de Cervera, daughter of Ponce and Almodis, sister of Raymond Berengar IV, Count of Barcelona. By this second marriage, he entered into alliance with the count of Barcelona, which represents the first Catalan influence in Sardinia. His correspondence with the count indicates the mutual nature of the alliance. Barisone warred against the Balearic Almoravids on behalf of Barcelona and Raymond Berengar supported his attempts to unite the various Judicates under his rule.

Firstly, as a direct descendant of Constantine II of Cagliari he claimed that Judicate from Peter, who was ruling jure uxoris through Constantine's daughter. Barisone invaded Cagliari and forced Peter to flee to his brother Barisone II's court at Torres. In Spring 1164, the Judicates of Torres and Cagliari, united with the Pisans of the island, retook Cagliari and invaded Arborea. Barisone took refuge in the castle of Cabras. From there, remembering his father's anti-Pisan policy, he contacted the Republic of Genoa, through which was enlisted the support of the Emperor Frederick Barbarossa. In August, the emperor proclaimed Barisone "King of Sardinia" in a ceremony in San Siro in Pavia. In exchange, Barisone agreed to annual payments of four thousand silver marks and to recognise imperial sovereignty over the island. In September, Barisone signed a treaty with Genoa. For military aid he granted them rights to set up markets in his territory and gave them the port of Oristano with the castles of Arculentu and Marmilla as surety against his payment of a large sum.

Early in 1165, Barisone was in Genoa with the consul Pizzamiglio. He was not allowed to return to Arborea because he could not raise the required sum. On 12 April, in an about-face, the emperor renounced his royal grant to Barisone and proclaimed the archdiocese of Pisa lord over the entire island. In 1168, Barisone returned to Arborea with the Genoese diplomat Nuvolone Alberici. The ongoing war there ended that year and Barisone tried raising the necessary payment for the Genoese. His wife and Ponç de Bas, his brother-in-law, were sent back to Genoa as hostages until, in 1171, the payment was made and Barisone and his family were freed.

In the 1170s, at the latest, he gave his daughter Ispella in marriage to Hug, the eldest brother of his new wife Agalbursa.

In 1180, Barisone made war on Cagliari. He had initial successes, but was captured and forced to come to terms. In 1182, he donated the church of San Nicolas di Gurgo to the Abbey of Montecassino. He founded a hospital and a monastery in Oristano. He struggled for the cultural and religious advancement of his realm in his final years. He died in 1186 and was succeeded by his eldest son Peter I, born from his first wife; the second son, also from the first marriage, Barisone, died by 1189. From his second marriage, Barisone had daughter, Susanna.

== Sources ==
- Ghisalbert, Alberto M. (ed). Dizionario Biografico degli Italiani: VI Baratteri – Bartolozzi. Rome, 1964.
- Scano, D. "Serie cronol. dei giudici sardi." Arch. stor. sardo. 1939.
- Besta, E. and Somi, A. I condaghi di San Nicolas di Trullas e di Santa Maria di Bonarcado. Milan, 1937.
- Onnis, Omar; Mureddu, Manuelle (2019). Illustres. Vita, morte e miracoli di quaranta personalità sarde (in Italian). Sestu: Domus de Janas. ISBN 978-88-97084-90-7. OCLC 1124656644.

Preceded by Comita II	Giudice of Arborea; 1146–1186	Succeeded by Peter I
