= Visconti of Pisa and Sardinia =

Italian noble dynasty

Arms of the Visconti of Gallura, depicting a cock

The Visconti of Pisa and Sardinia were an Italian noble dynasty of the Middle Ages. They achieved prominence first in Pisa, then in Sardinia, where they became rulers of Gallura.

== History ==
The first Visconti of note in Pisa was Alberto, who bore the title patrician. Alberto's son, Eldizio, bore the titles patrician and consul from 1184 to 1185. It was Eldizio's sons, Lamberto and Ubaldo I, who brought the family to the height of its influence in Pisa and Sardinia. Both of them carried the title of patrician and each served a term as podestà.

In 1212, various factions (pro- and anti-Visconti) clashed for control over Pisa. In mid-January 1213, William I of Cagliari led a coalition of anti-Visconti forces to victory in battle near Massa over the combined forces of Lucca and the Visconti under Ubaldo. Afterward, Pisa divided power between four rectores, one of which was a Visconti. The Visconti of Sardinia continued to take a part in Pisan politics to the end of the century, but their influence there was greatly diminished after 1213.

In Sardinia, Eldizio had married a daughter of Torchitorio III of Cagliari, who became the mother of Lamberto and Ubaldo. In 1207, Lamberto married Elena, the heiress of Barisone II of Gallura, thus securing control over the northeastern corner of Sardinia with his capital at Civita. In 1215, he and Ubaldo established their hegemony over the Giudicato of Cagliari in the south of the island as well. Through advantageous marriages, Lamberto's son, Ubaldo II, secured power in Logudoro for a time. By mid century, Pisan authority was unopposed in Sardinia, thanks to intermarriages between the Visconti family and the other great families of Pisa (Gherardeschi and Capraia) and Sardinia (Lacon and Bas-Serra).

== Visconti rulers of Gallura ==
- Lambert (1207–1225)
- Ubaldo (1225–1238)
- John (1238–1275)
- Nino (1275–1296) – his wife Beatrice d'Este (d. 15 September 1334) married secondly on 24 June 1300 to Galeazzo I Visconti (1277–1328), Lord of Milan
- Joanna (1296–1308), stepsister of Azzone Visconti of the Milan line
