= Torchitorio II of Cagliari =

Marianus II Torchitorio II

Judge/King of Cagliari
- Reign: 1103-1130
- Predecessor: Constantine I Salusio II
- Successor: Constantine II Salusio III
- Died: 1130
- Spouse: Preziosa of Zori
- Issue: Constantine II Salusio III, Judge of Cagliari
- House: Lacon-Gunale
- Father: Constantine I Salusio II
- Mother: Giorgia of Lacon

Torchitorio II (died 1130), also known by his birth name as Marianus II and surnamed de Unali, was the Judge of Cagliari from circa 1102 to his death, but initially with opposition.

Torchitorio was the son of Salusio II. When Salusio died, the office of judge was still nominally electoral and Salusio's brother Torbeno seems to have pressed a claim to it. Nevertheless, Torbeno's government was short-lived and Torchitorio was soon securely in power, and the principle of hereditary succession was further entrenched in Cagliari. His return to power was the result of the aid of the Genoese, who lent six galleys under Ottone Fornari, and probably also that of the Republic of Pisa.

Torchitorio's first recorded public act was a donation to the Church of S. Lorenzo in Genoa in thankfulness for the aid. He also made grants to the church in Pisa. His gratefulness to the Pisans was recorded in a donation along with the names of all the noble citizens of Cagliari. The Pisans agreed to defend the peninsula of Sulcis with three of their galleys, but as this would stretch their resources, Torchitorio had to pay them an annual tribute of one pound pure gold and a shipload of salt. He also released Pisan merchants from customs dues and made later charters also in favour of Pisan commerce, always reaffirming his gratefulness for their assistance in recovering his realm.

Torchitorio's politics, however, were not skewed to one republic or the other. He obtained the protection of Genoa and authorised William, Archbishop of Cagliari, to make a donation of the church of S. Giovanni d'Assemine to the church of Genoa. He also confirmed his previous acts in favour of Pisa with the consent of his son Salusio III and his wife Preciosa de Lacon.

As to his relations with the church, Torchitorio's name is found subscribing many charters of the archbishop William in favour of Antiochus of Sulcis and S. Saturnino and he was probably a devotee of that last saint.

Torchitorio was at first at odds with his deposed uncle, but he soon was back on good terms and Torbeno appears in later documents alongside the judge's other relatives. He subscribed the charter making a large donation to the church of Saint-Victor at Marseille. Torbeno left Torchitorio's court after two years to take part in the successful Pisan-Sardinian expedition against the Almoravids of the Balearic Islands. Both Torchitorio and Constantine I of Logudoro supported the expedition, the latter sending his own son Saltaro.

== Sources ==
- Manno, Giuseppe (1835). Storia di Sardegna. P.M. Visaj.

Preceded by Salusio II	Judge of Cagliari; 1116–1130	Succeeded by Salusio III
