= Agalbursa =

Agalbursa de Bas (or Agalburga, Galbors)(fl. 12th century CE) was the daughter of Ponce de Cervera, viscount of Bas (a Catalan magnate), and Almodis, daughter of Raymond Berengar III of Barcelona. King Alfonso of Aragon was her cousin. In 1157, she married Barisone II of Arborea as his second wife. He was the ruler of Arborea, one of the four kingdoms into which Sardinia had been divided. The marriage lead many Catalan families to come live in Arborea.

She was the mother of possibly one daughter, Susanna.

Her stepdaughter Ispella married Agalbursa's brother Hugh I of Bas (c1150-c1179) and was the mother of Hugh I of Arborea. When Barisone died in 1186, Agalbursa signed a charter as Dei gratia Arboree Regina. She opposed her husband's eldest son by his first wife, Peter de Serra, and instead tried to impose her own nephew Hugh on the throne of Arborea with the help of her cousin Alfonso II of Aragon and the Republic of Genoa.

She was possibly married secondly with the Catalan magnate, Ramon de Montcada, lord of Tortosa and Lleida.

== Sources ==
- Ghisalberti, Alberto M. (ed) Dizionario Biografico degli Italiani: VI Baratteri – Bartolozzi. Rome, 1964.
- Moore, John C. "Pope Innocent III, Sardinia, and the Papal State." Speculum, Vol. 62, No. 1. (January 1987), pp 81–101.
- Tola, Pasquale. Codex diplomaticus Sardiniae. Turin, 1868.
