= Comita III of Torres =

Comita II
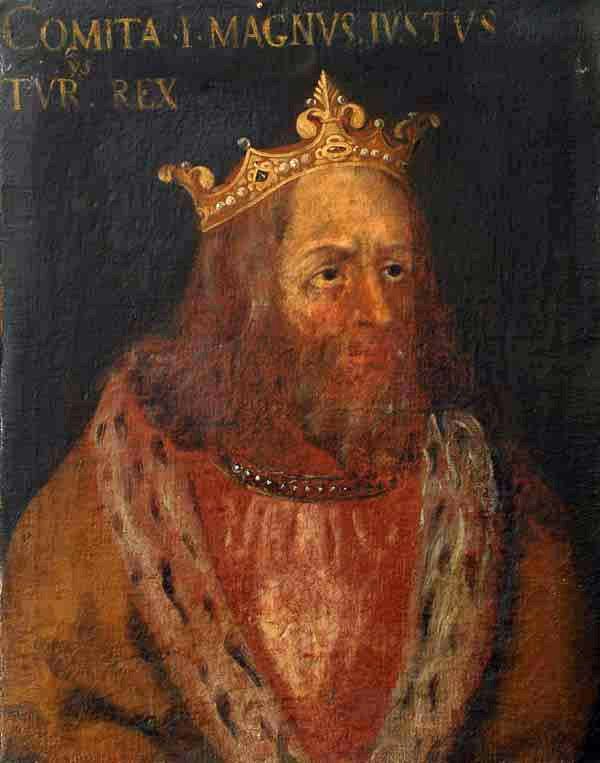

Judge/King of Logudoro/Torres
- Reign: 1191–1218
- Predecessor: Constantine II
- Successor: Marianus II
- Born: c.1160 Porto Torres
- Died: 10 November 1218 (aged 57–58)
- Spouse: Sinispella of Arborea; Agnes of Saluzzo
- Issue: Marianus II, King of Torres; Mary, Princess of Saluzzo; Maria
Names
- Comita de Lacon-Gunale
- House: Lacon-Gunale
- Father: Gonario II or Barisone II, Kings of Torres
- Mother: Mary Ebriaco or Preziosa of Orrubu

Comita III (c. 1160 – 1218) was the giudice of Logudoro, with its capital at Torres, from 1198 until 1218. He was the youngest of four sons of Barisone II of Torres and Preziosa de Orrubu. He ruled at a time when the great families, usually foreign, were superseding the giudici in power and influence on Sardinia.

Around 1180, he married Ispella (daughter of Barisone II of Arborea by his first, divorced, wife Pellegrina de Lacon), herself widow of Hug de Cervera and mother of Ugone de Bas, co-giudice of Arborea. By her he had four children: Maria, who married Boniface, heir of Manfred II of Saluzzo; Preziosa; Marianus, his heir; and Giorgia, who married Manuele Doria. He himself married as his second wife Agnes, the sister of Boniface.

In December 1198, his elder brother Constantine II died heirless in battle with William I of Cagliari. Comita succeeded to the giudicato. Both Constantine (and subsequently Comita) and William were at war with Peter I of Arborea over the co-rule of Arborea. At the time of his succession to the pro-Genoese state of Logudoro, Goceano was in William's hands. In exchange for Goceano, Comita considered siding with Pisa and expelling the Genoese from his giudicato, as well as relinquishing his claims to Arborea. In an ensuing peace treaty with Cagliari, Marianus, Comita's heir, married Agnes of Massa, William's daughter, who brought with her Goceano as a dowry.

Soon, however, Comita accused William to Pope Innocent III of aggression and other breaches of their accord. Arborea came under papal protection. In response, William married another daughter of his to Ugone, the co-judge of Arborea and a stepson of Comita. William effectively took control of Arborea.

In 1203, William Malaspina, a cousin of William of Cagliari, tried to marry the daughter of Barisone II of Gallura. This attempt to control the Galluran judgeship was nixed by the pope. In 1205, Lamberto Visconti married her. By a treaty confirmed in 1211, Comita allied with Genoa to conquer the whole island and bring under their control. There were to be no separate peaces. Together they invaded Gallura, now ruled by Lamberto. After that, with the support of Innocent, they invaded Arborea, an invasion which ended in the partition of the realm: half going to Barisone III, son of Peter I, and a quarter each going to Comita and William of Cagliari. The 1212 campaign was interrupted by Pisan repercussions and in 1214, William died. Lamberto and Ubaldo I Visconti took the opportunity that year to launch an offensive at Gallura, Cagliari, and Arborea, but were beaten off by Comita and Genoa. The war continued at sea, but was arrested by the entreaties of Pope Honorius III, who forced Comita to come to terms with Pisa (1 December 1217). Comita died sometime the next year, when his successor appears first as giudice on 10 November 1218.

== Sources ==
- Caravale, Mario (ed). Dizionario Biografico degli Italiani: XXVII Collenuccio – Confortini. Rome, 1982.

Preceded by Constantine II	Giudice of Logudoro; 1198–1218	Succeeded by Marianus II
