= House of Orlandi =

- Noble House
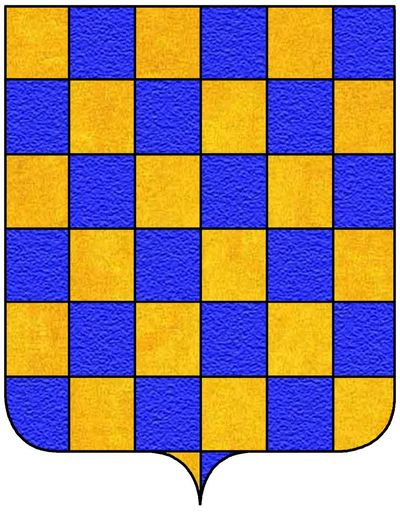
- Country: March of Tuscany; Republic of Pisa; Republic of Florence; Grand Duchy of Tuscany
- Founded: 10th century
- Founder: Rodilando Orlandi
- Titles: Duce of Pisa (non-hereditary); Count (non-hereditary); Viscount (non-hereditary); Seigneur of Sassetta; Seigneur of Stiava; Seigneur of Quiesa; Seigneur of Bozzano; Seigneur of Migliarino; Noble of Pescia; Patrician of Pisa; Patrician of Florence
- Traditions: Roman Catholicism
- Dissolution: 1519 (original line)
- Cadet branches: 4 cadet branches; still alive only 3: List: Orlandi of Pescia; Orlandi-Cardini; Orlandis of Maiorca

The House of Orlandi was an Italian political and military family of the Republic of Pisa, dating back as early as the 10th century.

== History ==
The Orlandi had a rivalry with the House of Della Gherardesca after Ugolino della Gherardesca's betrayal in the battle of Meloria.

There is an Orlandi Chapel in the church of Saint Francis in Pescia.

== See also ==
- History of Pisa
- Maritime republics
- Republic of Pisa

== Sources ==
- Guccio Nauesi: Istoria genealogica delle famiglie nobili toscane, et vmbre, Firenze 1671
- Touring Club of Italy: Toscana, Umbria, Marche, Milano 2002
- Antonio Musarra: 1284 La battaglia della Meloria, Roma 2018
