= Della Gherardesca family =

Italian noble family

Coat of arms of the House of della Gherardesca.

The House of Gherardesca was an ancient Italian noble family of the Republic of Pisa, of Longobard origin. The family likely dates back as early as the 11th century.

They were one of the most prominent families initially in Pisa, then of Volterra and eventually of Florence. They were of Ghibelline sympathies and held the county of Donoratico.

== History ==
Constantine I of Gallura may have been a member of the family, ruling Gallura on behalf of the Archdiocese of Pisa.

The Gherardeschi had a rivalry with the House of Visconti, another Ghibelline family of Pisa. In 1237, the Archbishop and the Emperor Frederick II intervened in Pisa to reconcile the two rivals, but failed. In 1254, the citizenry rebelled and imposed twelve Anziani del Popolo ("Elders of the People") as their political representatives.

Early on in the century, the Gherardeschi took an interest in the affairs of Pisa in Sardinia. In 1230, Ubaldo of Gallura, a Visconti, invaded the Giudicato of Cagliari, but the Gherardeschi repulsed him in the name of Benedetta and the young William II. In 1258, they received a third of Cagliari after it was split up. Their third was the south-western third; in the 1272 circa the count Ugolino della Gherardesca founded in the Cixerri the important mining town of Villa di Chiesa, today Iglesias. A Gherardesca woman also married John Visconti, the Judge of Gallura, who had received the northeastern third of Cagliari. This marriage brought final reconciliation between the Visconti and Gherardeschi.

The Gherardeschi reached their height in Pisa in the person of Ugolino della Gherardesca in the 1270s and 1280s. He was forced to share power with his nephew Nino Visconti, but they soon quarrelled. The fed-up Pisans arrested Ugolino and deposed Nino from Gallura.

After Ugolino della Gherardesca's betrayal in the battle of Meloria, the House of Orlandi also began rivalries with the Gherardeschi.

There is a Gherardesca Chapel in the church of Saint Francis in Pisa.

== Notable members ==
- Ugolino della Gherardesca (c. 1220–1289), politician
- Emilia della Gherardesca (d. 1349), duchess of Mantua
- Cosimo della Gherardesca (1567-1634), bishop
- Tommaso della Gherardesca (1654-1721), archbishop
- Ugolino della Gherardesca II (1823-1882), politician
- Ugolino della Gherardesca III (1874-19572), politician
- Giuseppe della Gherardesca (1876-1968), politician
- Sveva della Gherardesca (1930-2026), wife of Nicholas Romanov, Prince of Russia
- Manfredi della Gherardesca (1961-2022), art dealer
- Costantino della Gherardesca (b. 1977) actor, journalist, and television personality
