= Riccus =

13th century archbishop of Cagliari, Sardinia

Riccus or Ricco was the Archbishop of Cagliari in the early thirteenth century.

In 1206, he requested the right to resign from Pope Innocent III, who simply enumerated the justifications for archiepiscopal resignation and left the decision up to Riccus. The following year (1207), he approved of the marriage (incestuous by canon law) of Hugh I of Arborea and a daughter of William I of Cagliari. He also did not intervene on the pope's behalf when Elena of Gallura, a ward of the pope, wed Lamberto di Eldizio without papal consent. For this, he received a stiff reprimand from Innocent.

== Sources ==
- Pennington, Kenneth. Popes and Bishops: The Papal Monarchy in the Twelfth and Thirteenth Centuries. Philadelphia, 1984.
- Moore, John C. "Pope Innocent III, Sardinia, and the Papal State." Speculum, Vol. 62, No. 1. (Jan., 1987), pp 81–101.
