= John of Gallura =

John Visconti

Judge/King of Gallura
- Reign: 1238-1275
- Predecessor: Ubaldo
- Successor: Nino
- Died: May 1275; San Miniato
- Spouse: Dominicata Gualandi-Cortevecchia; Giovanna della Gherardesca
- Issue: Nino, King of Gallura
Names
- John Visconti
- House: Visconti (Sardinia branch)
- Father: Ubaldo Visconti, governor of Cagliari

John (or Giovanni) Visconti (died 1275) was the Judge of Gallura from 1238 to his death. He was a member of the Visconti dynasty of Pisa.

== Biography ==
John was the son of Ubaldo I Visconti and cousin of Ubaldo of Gallura. When the latter Ubaldo drew up a will in January 1237 at Silki, John was nominated to succeed him. However, Enzo, the husband of his Ubaldo's widow Adelasia of Torres, seems to have taken control of both Gallura and Logudoro and was granted the title King of Sardinia by his father, the Emperor Frederick II. Nevertheless, John was soon in power in Gallura.

In 1254, he joined the Republic of Pisa in her attack on John of Cagliari. In 1258, the Republic partitioned the Giudicato of Cagliari amongst her supporters. John annexed a third of it — Ogliastra, Quirra, Sarrabus, and Colostrai — to Gallura. John subsequently remained mostly on the Italian peninsula, participating in the wars between the Guelphs and the Ghibellines on the side of Pisa. He returned to the island in 1274, but was back in Pisa the next year, when he died there. All his possessions passed to the Republic.

He married Dominicata, daughter of Aldobrandino Gualandi-Cortevecchia, but she died in 1259. He was later re-married to Giovanna, a daughter of Ugolino della Gherardesca, Count of Donoratico. He was one of Ugolino's few supporters during the factional infighting which plagued Pisa. His son by Ugolino's daughter, Ugolino, called Nino, succeeded him.

Preceded by Ubaldo	Judge of Gallura; 1238–1275	Succeeded by Nino
