= Nuvolone Alberici =

Genoese diplomat and statesman

Nuvolone Alberici (alternatively Nuvelonus, Nubelo, or Nebolonus) was a diplomat and statesman of the early Republic of Genoa during some of its formative years. He was a brother of Ottobuono Alberici.

He was first appointed a console dei placiti and socio within a società, a trading society, commercing with Sicily in 1158. In 1160, he was reelected with his brother and, in 1162, he was elected console del Comune, the highest political post in the republic. On 9 June, he was at the court of the Emperor Frederick I to secure recognition of the Genoese commune. He was reelected consul in 1168 and 1178.

In 1164, he went with the genero (general) Anglerio to Algeria to establish a società in Béjaïa. In 1168, he travelled to Sardinia to mediate the war between the filogenovesi and filopisani, the supporters of Genoa and Pisa, respectively. He forced a treaty on the warring giudicati of Arborea, Logudoro, and Cagliari and obtained a promise from Barison II of Logudoro to defend the rights of Genoa in Arborea, then under the control of another Barison II, who had defaulted on his tribute to the Genoese in return for the royal coronation they had obtained for him in 1164.

In 1169, Nuvolone and Baldizone Usodimare resolved a territorial controversy in Versilia with ambassadors from Pisa and Lucca. In 1171, he was at the latter city to negotiate a treaty forming a common army.

Around 1170, he received Byzantine ambassadors from Manuel I at Terracina with three ships. Manuel was seeking to ally with Pisa and Genoa against Venice. In 1179, Nuvolone accompanied the archbishop of Genoa, Ugone della Volta, to the First Lateran Council in Rome. Nuvolone was reelected consul in 1181, 1184, and 1192, the last time despite the arrival of Manegoldo del Tettoccio da Brescia, who had made himself the first podestà, in 1190.

== Sources ==
- Caravale, Mario (ed). Dizionario Biografico degli Italiani.
