= Constantine II of Cagliari =

Costantino Salusio III

Judge/King of Cagliari
- Reign: 1130-1163
- Predecessor: Mariano II Torchitorio II
- Successor: Pietro Torchitorio III
- Died: 1163
- Spouse: Giorgia of Gunale; Sardinia of Arborea
- Issue: Sinispella, Queen of Cagliari; Preziosa; Giorgia, Marchioness of Massa
- House: Lacon-Gunale
- Father: Mariano II Torchitorio II
- Mother: Giorgia of Lacon

Constantine II (circa 1100 – 1163) was the giudice of Cagliari (as Salusio III from circa 1129). He was called de Pluminus after his capital city.

He was the only son of Torchitorio II. From his youth he was associated as co-ruler with his father. He first bears the title iudex Caralitanus in a document of 13 February 1130 in which he confirmed certain donations of his father in Pisa. As it was traditional for a giudice to begin his reign by confirm some grant of his predecessor's, this 1130 confirmation probably indicates that Constantine's reign began just before that date.

Constantine continued to support Western monasticism in his domains. The monks, mostly foreign immigrants, brought economic, technological, ecclesiastic, agricultural, and educational advances as well as close ties to continental Europe. Constantine patronised the monasteries founded by monks from Saint-Victor in Marseille, who dominated religious life in Cagliari at the turn of the twelfth century. However, surging Pisan religious houses came into conflict the Provençal monasteries, while the archbishop of Cagliari came into conflict with not only the archbishop of Pisa, but also Constantine. Nevertheless, the 1150s saw restoration and renovation of sacred art and edifices. Along with Gonario II of Torres and Comita I of Gallura, Constantine pledged fidelity to the archbishop of Pisa. All this suggests strong allegiance to the reformed papacy despite the still near-autonomous status of Cagliari at the time.

Constantine's first wife was Giorgia de Unale (a noble family from Naples.) His second wife was Sardinia de Zori, by whom he had three daughters. The eldest married Peter of Torres, who succeeded Constantine on his death in 1163. The second daughter, Giorgia, married Obert, Margrave of Massa; the third, Preziosa, Tedice di Donoratico (della Gherardesca), Pisan count of Castagneto.

== Sources ==
- Ghisalberti, Aldo (ed). Dizionario Biografico degli Italiani: XXX Cosattini – Crispolto. Rome, 1984.

Preceded by Marianus Torchitorio II	Giudice of Cagliari; 1129–1163	Succeeded by Peter Torchitorio III
