= Enzo of Sardinia =

Enzo
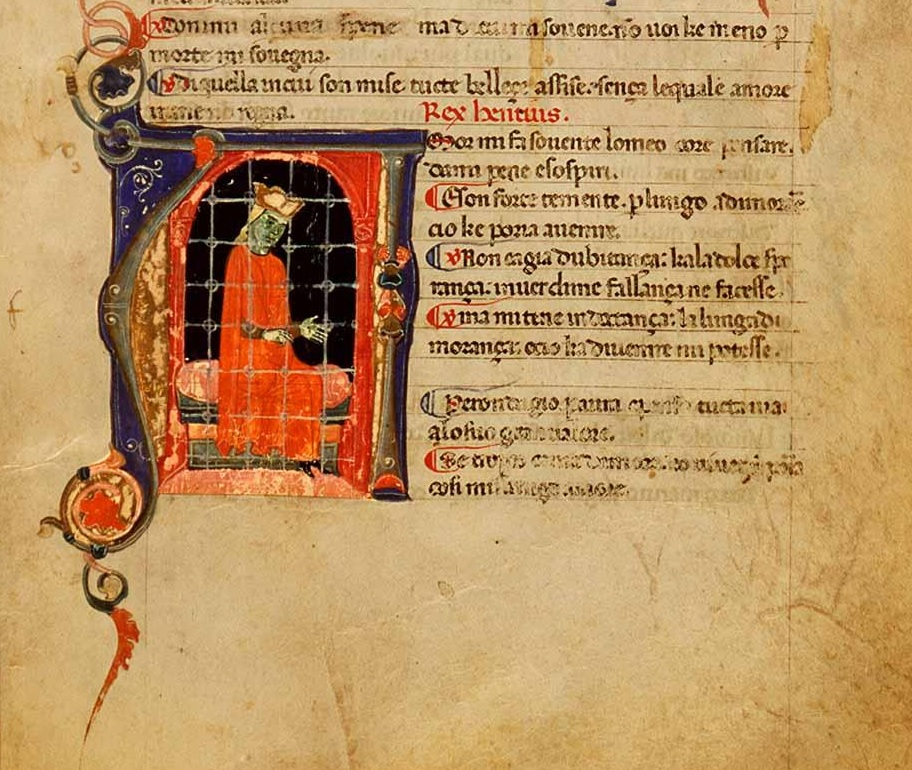
- The captured King Enzio of Sardinia (here called "Rex Hentius") in the initial to Amor mi fa sovente in the song manuscript Canzoniere Palatino, created in Pistoia at the end of the 13th century

King of Sardinia
- Reign: 1238 –1249

Judge/King of Logudoro/Torres (jure uxoris)
- Reign: 1238 – 1245/6 (de facto) or 1272 (de jure)
- Co-ruler: Adelasia
- Born: c. 1218
- Died: 14 March 1272 (age c. 53-54); Bologna, Papal States
- Spouse: Adelasia of Torres
- Issue: illegitimate Elena; Maddalena; Costanza; Enrico
- House: Hohenstaufen
- Father: Frederick II, Holy Roman Emperor
- Mother: Adelaide of Urslingen

Enzo (also Enzio; (Note: Italianisation of Heinz, diminutive of Heinrich, German form of Henry. In the primary sources, in Latin he is Ensius, Encius, Enzius, Entius, Hençus, Henzius, and occasionally Henricus.) c. 1218 – 14 March 1272) was an illegitimate son of the Hohenstaufen emperor Frederick II, who appointed him King of Sardinia in 1238. He played a major role in the wars between Guelphs and Ghibellines in the Imperial kingdom of Italy, and was captured by his enemies in 1249. He remained imprisoned in Bologna until his death.

== Biography ==
Enzo was an illegitimate son of Frederick II by a certain Adelaide, a member of the Swabian noble House of Urslingen and relative of Duke Conrad I of Spoleto. He was the second of the emperor's illegitimate sons and allegedly the favourite one until the birth of Manfredi. He had a pleasant personality, a strong physical resemblance to his father, and also shared his love for the arts. Enzo fought in the ongoing wars of his father with Pope Gregory IX and the Northern Italian communes of the Lombard League.

When Ubaldo Visconti died in 1238, the Doria noble family of Genoa, in order to secure the Sardinian Giudicato of Logudoro from Pisan domination, convinced the emperor to marry Enzo to Ubaldo's widow, Adelasia of Torres (died 1255). Upon the marriage, Enzo by jure uxoris would accede to the Sardinian Giudicati of Logudoro (Torres) and Gallura, covering the northern half of the island of Sardinia. He was created a knight in Cremona and granted the Sardinian royal title, last held by Barisone II of Arborea in 1164/65. Enzo travelled to the island to marry Adelasia in October that year.

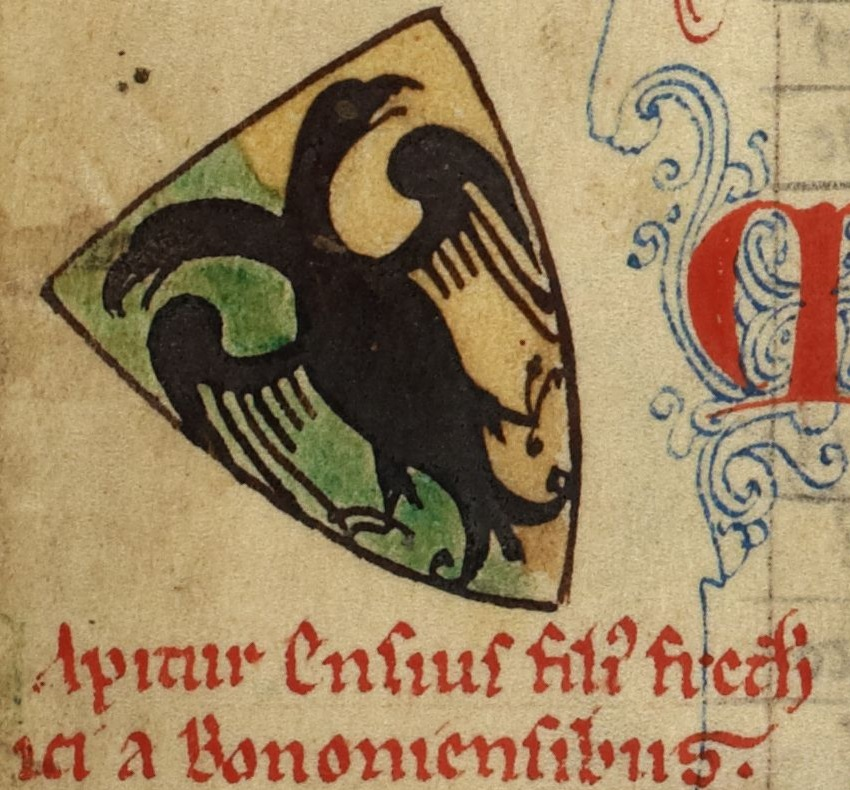
Coat of arms of Enzo of Sardinia

In July 1239, he was assigned as Imperial vicar general in Lombardy, as well as General-Legate in Romagna, and left Sardinia never to return. Sharing in his father's excommunication in the same year, he took a prominent part in the war which broke out between the emperor and the pope. In 1241, he took part in the capture of a papal fleet at the Battle of Giglio in the Tyrrhenian Sea. His first successful move as military leader was the reconquest of Jesi, in the Marche, which was Frederick's birthplace. In May 1241 he was in command of the forces which defeated the Genoese fleet at Meloria, where he seized a large amount of booty and captured a number of ecclesiastics who were proceeding to a council summoned by Gregory to Rome. Later he was captured in a skirmish against the Milanese at Gorgonzola, but soon released. In 1245 or 1246 his marriage was annulled. In 1247, he took part in the unsuccessful Siege of Parma and continued to fight the Guelph Lombards, assaulting Reggio and conducting an assault in the surroundings of Parma.

During a campaign to support the Ghibelline cities of Modena and Cremona against Guelph in Bologna, he was defeated and captured on 26 May 1249 at the Battle of Fossalta. Though the emperor demanded his release, Enzo was thenceforth kept a knightly prisoner in Bologna, in a palace that came to be named Palazzo Re Enzo after him. Every attempt to escape or to rescue him failed, and he died after more than 22 years in captivity. After a magnificent funeral he was buried in the Basilica of San Domenico in Bologna. After the death of his half-brothers Conrad IV in 1254, Frederick of Antioch in 1256 and Manfred in 1266, as well as the execution of his nephew Conradin in 1268, he was one of the last of Hohenstaufen heirs. (Note: The last member of the Hohenstaufen dynasty was Enrico (d. 1318), son of Manfred of Sicily and Helena of Epirus, as cited in History of the City of Rome in the Middle Ages. Vol. 5, Part 2, by Ferdinand Gregorovius (2010) [1897]. Cambridge University Press.) (Note: However, the last patrilineal descendant of the family, albeit not possessing dynastic rights for coming from an illegitimate branch, was Enzo's great-niece, Giovanna di Stevia (1280 – 1352), a daughter of his nephew, Conrad, and grand-daughter of his half-brother, Frederick of Antioch (as referenced by Mario Carrara in Gli Scaglieri, Varese, Dell'Oglio, 1966).)

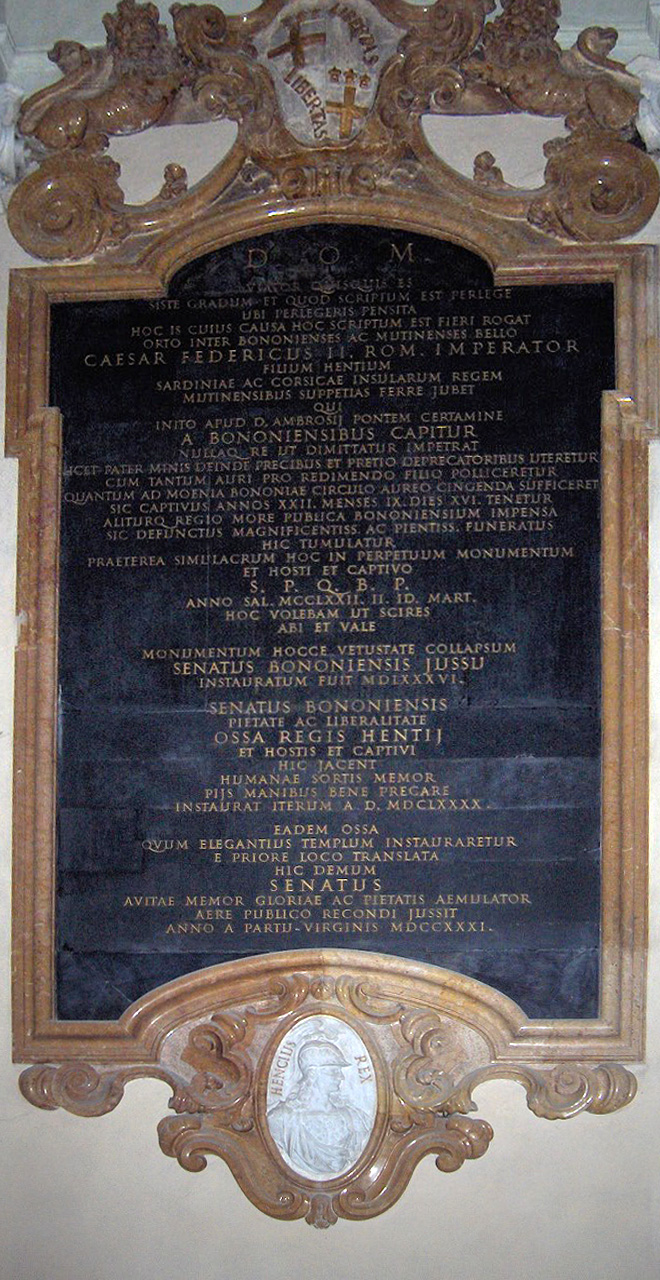
Posthumous epitaph from 1731 by Giuseppe Maria Mazza in the Basilica of San Domenico, Bologna

Enzo shared the father's passion for falconry, and was thus nicknamed Falconello ("little falcon"). He was the dedicatee of a French translation of a hunting treatise by Yatrib. Like his brother Manfred, he presumably grew fond of poetry at Frederick's court: during his long imprisonment Enzo wrote several poems, two of his canzoni and a sonnet (Tempo vene che sale chi discende) are preserved. His fate and the fall of the Hohenstaufen dynasty was itself a source of inspiration for several poets, such as the Italian lyricist Giovanni Pascoli (Canzoni di re Enzio, 1909).

The powerful Bentivoglio family of Bologna and Ferrara claimed descent from him.

== Issue ==
He had no legittimate issue, but had four natural children, the last three of which were born during his imprisonment in Bologna:

- Elena, who married Guelfo della Gherardesca, son of the Earl Ugolino;
- Maddalena;
- Costanza;
- Enrico.

Furthermore, a legend has it that he was the founder of the Bentivoglio family, a prominent Bolognese family, who traced their origins back to a son, also named Enrico, born to Enzo and a peasant woman named Lucia on 4 May 1252 in Viadagola.

== See also ==
- Adelasia of Torres
- Frederick II, Holy Roman Emperor
- Giudicato of Logudoro

== Sources ==
- Bedürftig, Friedemann (2000). Taschenlexikon Staufer (in German). Piper. ISBN 3492230326.
- Calenda, Corrado (2005). "ENZO, re di Torres e dI Gallura, attività poetica". Federiciana. Rome: Istituto dell'Enciclopedia Italiana.
- Cioppi, Alessandra (1995). Enzo re di Sardegna (in Italian). Sassari: Carlo Delfino.
- Decker-Hauff, Hansmartin (1967). Die Chronik der Grafen von Zimmern (Band III ed.). Fürstlich Fürstenbergische Hofbibliothek Donaueschingen.
- Mühlberger, Josef. Lebensweg und Schicksal der staufischen Frauen (in German).
- Pini, Antonio I. (1993). "ENZO di Svevia, re di Sardegna". Dizionario Biografico degli Italiani (in Italian). Vol. 43: Enzo–Fabrizi. Rome: Istituto dell'Enciclopedia Italiana. ISBN 978-88-12-00032-6.
- Roversi Monaco, Francesca (2005). "ENZO, re di Torres e dI Gallura". Federiciana. Rome: Istituto dell'Enciclopedia Italiana.
- Sperle, Christian (2001). König Enzo von Sardinien und Friedrich von Antiochia. Zwei illegitime Söhne Kaiser Friedrichs II. und ihre Rolle in der Verwaltung des Regnum Italiae (in German). P. Lang. ISBN 3-631-37457-7.
- Columbia Encyclopedia: Enzio.

Preceded by Ubaldo	Giudice of Logudoro; 1238–1245	Succeeded by none
