= Torchitorio IV of Cagliari =

Judge of Cagliari from 1214 to 1217

Barisone II Torchitorio IV

Judge/King of Arborea
- Reign: 1214–1217
- Predecessor: Peter I (in Arborea)
- Successor: Peter II (in Arborea)

Judge/King of Cagliari (jure uxoris)
- Reign: 1214–1217
- Predecessor: William I Salusio IV (in Cagliari)
- Successor: William II Salusio V (in Cagliari)
- Co-monarch: Benedetta (in Cagliari)
- Died: 1217
- Spouse: Benedetta
- Issue: William II Salusio V
- House: Lacon-Gunale (Serra branch)
- Father: Peter I
- Mother: Bina [Jacobina]

Barisone II Torchitorio IV de Serra (c. 1190 – after 20 April 1217) was the Judike (Judge) of Arborea and Cagliari.

He was a son of Peter I and Bina. His father was Judge of half of Arborea from 1195 to his death in 1214 along with Hugh I. When Hugh died in 1211, Barisone laid claim to his portion of the Judicate, laying claim to the whole on his father's death three years later. He married Benedetta, the heiress of William I of Cagliari, and succeeded him on that throne.

William held Peter I imprisoned and in order to legitimise his control over half of Arborea, he married his daughter to Peter's heir in 1214. Torchitorio and Benedetta were related within the prohibited degree, but Pope Innocent III gave them dispensation to marry. They subsequently did homage to the pope on 18 November 1215, probably to avoid domination by the Republic and Archdiocese of Pisa.

Torchitorio died in 1217 and left a months-old son, William II, who succeeded him in Cagliari, while Hugh's son Peter II maintained himself in all Arborea.

== Sources ==
- Moore, John C. (1987). "Pope Innocent III, Sardinia, and the Papal State". Speculum. 62 (1): 81–101. doi:10.2307/2852567. JSTOR 2852567. S2CID 162788264.
- Nowé, Laura Sannia. Dai "lumi" dalla patria Italiana: Cultura letteraria sarda. Mucchi Editore: Modena, 1996.

Preceded by Peter I	Judge of Arborea; 1214–1217	Succeeded by Peter II
Preceded by William I	Judge of Cagliari; 1214–1217	Succeeded by William II
