= Aldo Ferrabino =

Italian historian and philosopher (1892–1972)

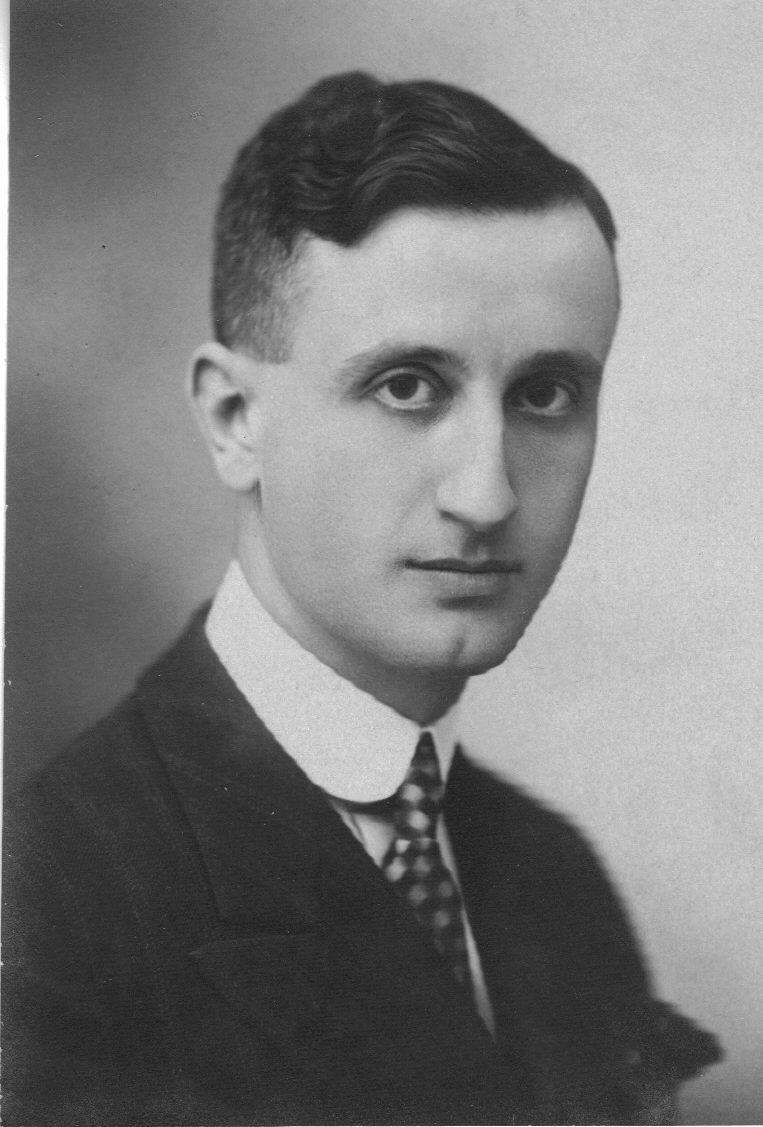
Image of Aldo Ferrabino

Aldo Ferrabino (26 June 1892, in Cuneo – 30 October 1972, in Rome) was an Italian historian, philosopher, librarian, writer, and poet. A graduate of the University of Turin, he taught ancient history at the University of Padua and the Sapienza University of Rome, later becoming rector at the University of Padua in 1947. From 1948 to 1954, he served in the Italian Senate for the Christian Democracy party. In 1950, he become a correspondent for the Accademia dei Lincei, and the president of the Istituto Centrale per il Catalogo Unico. From 1954 to 1972, he was president of the Treccani encyclopaedia. In 1956, he was elected the president of the Dante Alighieri Society. In 1957, he co-founded the magazine Il Veltro with Vincenzo Cappelletti. Considered an expert on Christology and the philosophy of history, he was made a Knight of the Civil Order of Savoy in 1970.
