= Lamberto Visconti di Eldizio =

Lamberto Visconti

Judge/King of Gallura
- Reign: 1207/18-1225
- Predecessor: Elena
- Successor: Ubaldo
- Co-monarch: Elena (until 1218)
- Died: 1225; Pisa
- Spouses: Elena, Queen of Gallura; Benedetta, Queen of Cagliari
- Issue: Ubaldo, King of Gallura
Names
- Lamberto Visconti
- House: Visconti (Sardinia branch)
- Father: Eldizio Visconti, consul of Pisa
- Mother: ? (daughter of Peter Torchitorio III of Cagliari

Lamberto Visconti di Eldizio (died 1225) was the Judge of Gallura from 1206, when he married the heiress Elena, to his own death. He was a member of the Visconti family of Pisa and the first of that dynasty to rule in Sardinia, where they lasted in Gallura for almost another century.

His grandfather, Alberto, was a patrician of Pisa, while his father, Eldizio, was patrician and consul (1184–1185). He and his brother Ubaldo in turn served as patrician and podestà. Lambert's grandmother was Aligarda and his mother was a daughter of Torchitorio III of Cagliari.

In 1207, Elena chose of her own will to marry Lambert, despite the fact that Pope Innocent III, to whom she and her state were pledged, had arranged a marriage with one of his own relatives. In 1209, Comita III of Logudoro invaded Gallura and took Civita and briefly held sway over the hold kingdom, but Lambert and his Pisan allies soon retook it. Between 1210 and 1215, with more Pisan support, Lambert attacked Logudoro and Arborea. In 1215, profiting from the weakness of Benedetta of Cagliari, he assembled a large fleet and landed an army at Cagliari. He captured the adjacent hill, which dominated the city, and fortified it. He gave the job of finishing up the conquest to his brother Ubaldo.

Elena died before 1220 and in that year, after the death of Torchitorio IV of Cagliari, Ubaldo arranged the marriage of his widow Benedetta to his brother Lambert. Lambert thus controlled two giudicati comprising most of Sardinia, the one in the right of his now-deceased wife and the other in the right of his stepson William II.

Lambert died in 1225 and was succeeded by his son Ubaldo in Gallura.

== Sources ==
- Ferrabino, Aldo (ed). Dizionario Biografico degli Italiani: I Aaron – Albertucci. Rome, 1960.

Preceded by Elena	Giudice of Gallura; 1207–1225	Succeeded by Ubaldo
