= Santa Igia =

Santa Igia or Santa Ilia, modern Santa Gilla lagoon (Santa Ilia being a contraction of Santa Cecilia), was a city in Sardinia, in what is now Italy, which existed from the 9th century AD to 1258, when it was destroyed by Pisan and Sardinian troops. It was the capital of the Giudicato of Cagliari, one of the kingdoms in which the island was divided in medieval times.

Parts of its remains are now found in the western part of Cagliari, as well as in the island of Sa Illetta.

== History ==
The area of Santa Igia was inhabited by the Phoenicians and the Romans. The latter, in particular, built a port (Portus Scipio) on the shores of the Stagno di Santa Gilla.

In 718 Arab pirates launched their first raids against the city of Caralis, destroying sectors of the city and enslaving some inhabitants. Thus some of the inhabitants of Caralis moved to the area facing the lagoon of Santa Gilla, founding the city of Santa Igia, whose port had been used also by the Byzantines. Starting from the 9th century AD, it became the seat of the giudice, the archbishop and the administration of the giudicato of Cagliari. At its peak it reached about 10.000-15.000 inhabitants. The area was walled and connected to the Castle of San Michele.

In 1258, during the process of conquest of the Giudicato of Cagliari, the Pisans and their Sardinian allies destroyed it.
