= Barisone II of Gallura =

Barisone
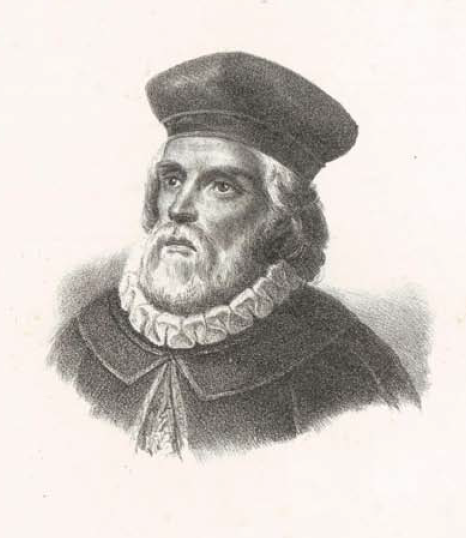
- Non-contemporaneous portrait of the monarch

Judge/King of Gallura
- Reign: 1161-1203
- Predecessor: Constantine III
- Successor: Elena
- Died: 1203
- Spouse: Elena de Lacon
- Issue: Elena, Queen of Gallura
- Barisone de Lacon-Gunale
- House: Lacon-Gunale
- Father: Constantine III, King of Gallura
- Mother: Anastasia/Elena of Arborea

Barisone II (died 1203) was the Judge of Gallura from about 1170 to his death. He was the son of Constantine III. His name appears in acts of 1182 and 1184.

He was married to Elena de Lacon and had a daughter named Elena who inherited Gallura. Barisone commended his judgeship to Pope Innocent III before he died, so as to protect his daughter's inheritance. He was probably looking at Innocent's succession protecting the rights of Constance and Frederick I of Sicily. There was a conflict in Sardinia following his death in 1203 as various powers sought the marriage of Elena to establish control over Gallura.

== Notes ==
Preceded by Constantine III	Giudice of Gallura c. 1170 – 1203	Succeeded by Elena
