= Lacon-Gunale =

The House of Lacon-Gunale was an indigenous Italian noble family of medieval Sardinia originally established in all the four thrones of the Judgedoms, the four Sardinian medieval kingdoms.

== Origin ==
Probably the Lacon and Gunale descended respectively from the last dux and praeses of Byzantine Sardinia, perhaps originating from the town of Laconi in Sarcidano and Gunale or Unale (no longer in existence, it was located in the countryside of Arzachena) in Gallura, which joined in a single family, that assumed the role of Iudex provinciae or Archon of Sardinia, residing in Caralis. From the 11th century, with the fragmentation of the island territory in Judgedoms, it divided into four branches.

== Bibliography ==
- Francesco Cesare Casula, Dizionario storico sardo, Carlo Delfino editore, Sassari, 2009
