= Sardinian medieval kingdoms =

Medieval kingdoms of Sardinia 800–1500 (CE)

The Kingdoms or Judgedoms of Sardinia

The Judicates, in English also referred to as Sardinian Kingdoms, Sardinian Judgedoms or Judicatures, were independent states that took power in Sardinia in the Middle Ages, between the eleventh and fifteenth centuries. They were sovereign states with summa potestas, each with a ruler called judge (judike in Sardinian), with the powers of a king.

== Historical causes of the advent of the kingdoms ==
After a relatively brief Vandal occupation (456–534), Sardinia was a province of the Byzantine Empire from 535 until the eighth century.

After 705, with the rapid Arab expansion, Saracen pirates from North Africa began to raid the island and encountered no effective opposition by the Byzantine army. In 815, Sardinian ambassadors requested military assistance from the Carolingian Emperor Louis the Pious.

In 807, 810–812, and 821–822, the Arabs of Spain and North Africa tried to invade the island but the Sardinians resisted several attacks. This defence was so effective that in a letter in 851 Pope Leo IV asked the Iudex Provinciae ('judge of the province') of Sardinia, based in Caralis, for aid in the defense of Rome. With the fall of the Exarchate of Africa, based in Carthage, at the end of the seventh century, and especially with the emergence of the Arab presence in Sicily (827), Sardinia remained disconnected from the core lands of the Byzantine Empire and had, out of necessity, become economically and militarily independent.

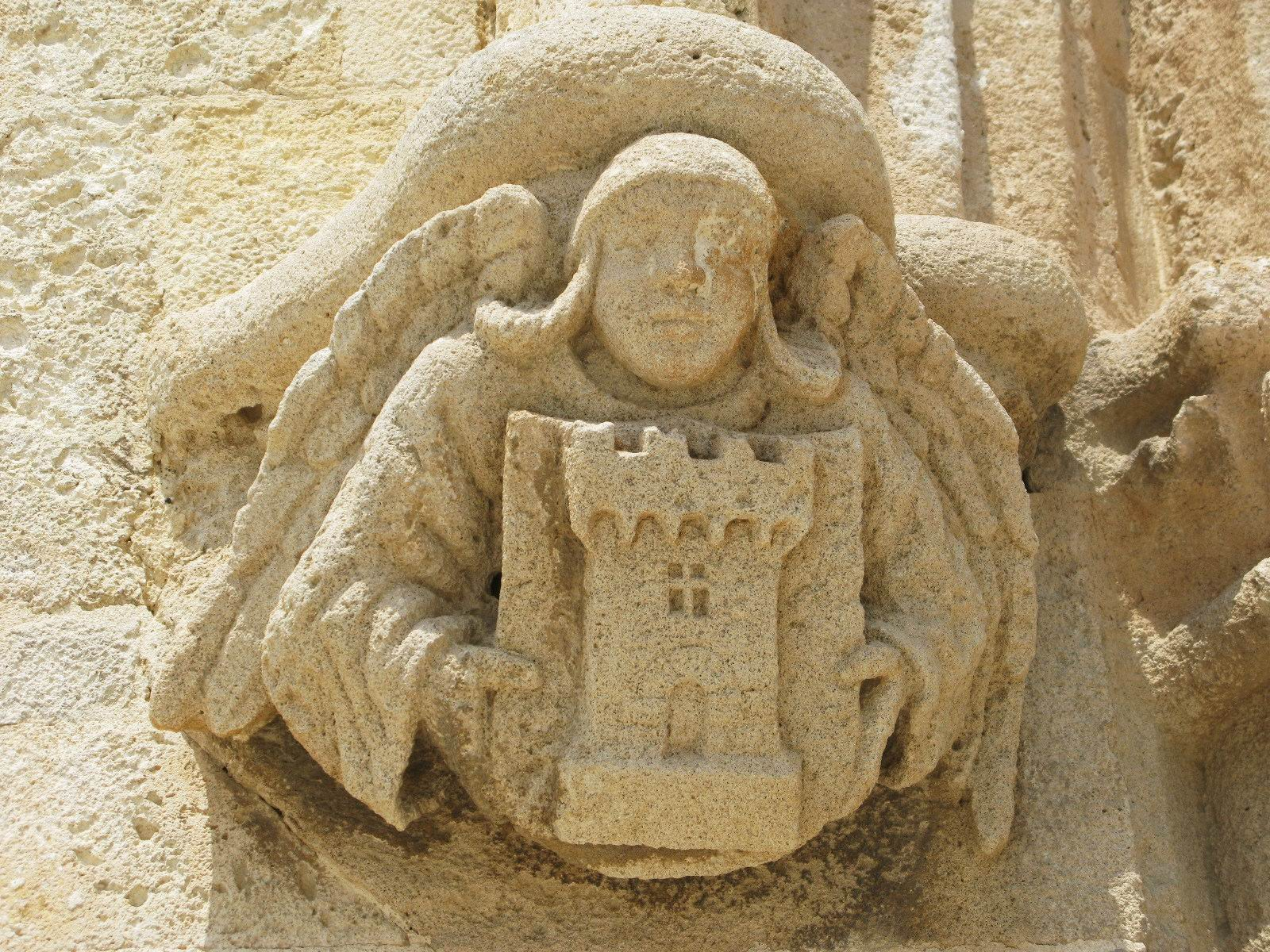
Arms of the Kingdom of Torres

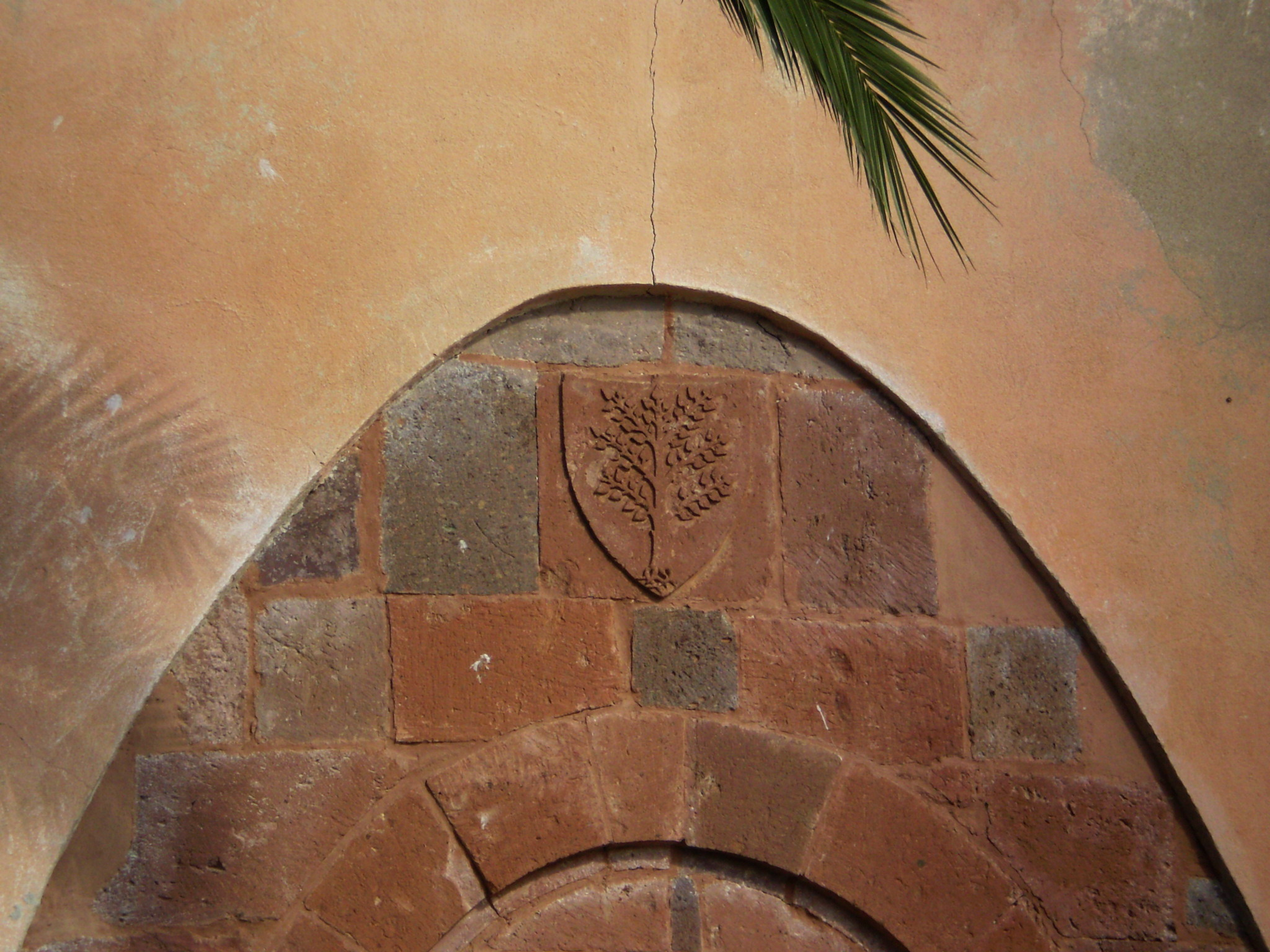
Arms of the Kingdom of Arborea

=== The birth of the four kingdoms ===
The almost total absence of historical sources does not allow certainty surrounding the date of the passage from Byzantine central authority to self-government in Sardinia. It is believed that at some point the Iudex Provinciae or Archon of Sardinia, residing in Caralis, had complete control of the island. He appointed, in the most strategic area for the defense of the coast, the lociservator (lieutenant), belonging to his family, the Lacon-Gunale, who became substantially autonomous from Caralis over time; this was probably the action that precipitated the birth of the kingdoms, or judgedoms.

The first incontrovertible source that cites the existence of four kingdoms is the epistle sent by Pope Gregory VII from Capua on 14 October 1073 to the Sardinian judges Orzocco of Cagliari, Orzocco d'Arborea, Marianus of Torres and Constantine of Gallura; however their autonomy was already clear in a later letter of Pope John VIII (872) in which he referred to them as principes Sardiniae ('princes of Sardinia').

The known medieval giudicati were:

- Kingdom of Cagliari with capital in Santa Igia
- Kingdom of Arborea with capital in Oristano,
- Kingdom of Gallura with capital in Civita,
- Kingdom of Torres with capital in Porto Torres, Ardara and then Sassari.

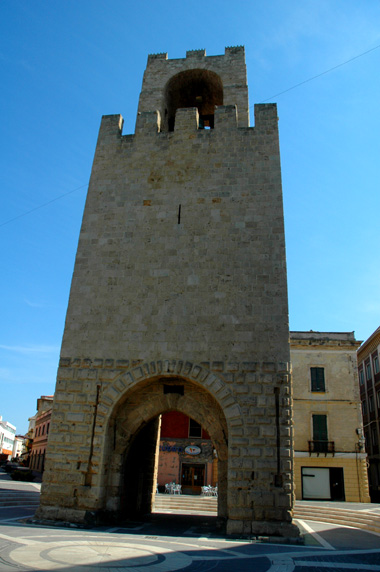
Tower of Marianus II of Arborea at Oristano

Each of the four States had fortified borders to protect their political and commercial interests, as well as their own laws, administration and emblems.

== Governments ==
The administrative organization of the judgedoms differed significantly from the feudal forms existing in the rest of medieval Europe as their institutions were closer to those of the territories of the Byzantine Empire, although with local peculiarities that some scholars consider of Nuragic derivation.

In the international context of the Middle Ages, the judgedoms were characterized by semi-democratic institutions such as the Coronas de curatorias which in turn elected their own representatives to the parliamentary assizes called Corona de Logu.

=== The Corona de Logu and the central council ===
The central government and the entire Judiciary were ruled substantially by the judge. The king did not have possession of the land nor was he the repository of sovereignty since this was formally held by the Corona de Logu, which acted as a legislature for the kingdoms. The Corona de Logu was made up of a council of elders (representatives of the administrative districts – Curadorias) and high priests. They appointed the ruler and attributed the supreme power to him, while maintaining the power to ratify acts and agreements related to the entire kingdom.

During su Collectu (coronation ceremony) in the capital, a representative of each curadoria, members of the high clergy, the castle lords, and two representatives of the capital elected by delegates from jurados Coronas de curatoria came together. Then the judex was crowned with a mixed-elected hereditary system following the direct male line and, only in the alternative, the female line.

The judge ruled on the basis of a covenant with the people (the bannus-consensus). The sovereign could be dethroned and, in cases of serious acts of tyranny and oppression, legitimately executed by the same people, without prejudicing the inheritance of the title within the same ruling dynasty.

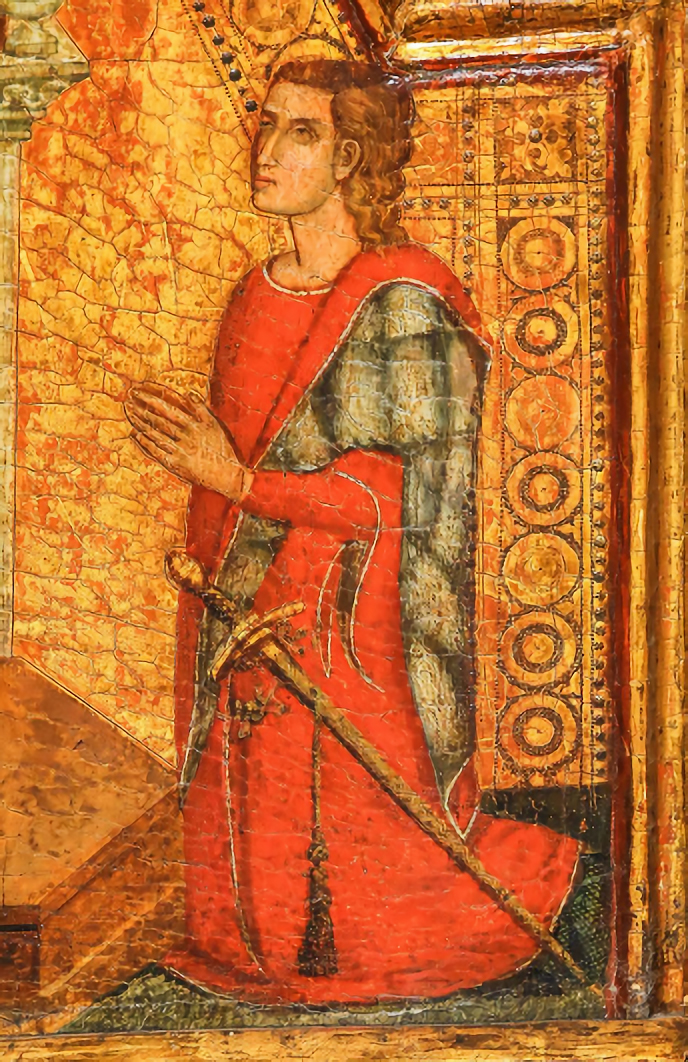
Marianus IV of Arborea

=== Judges ===
The judge was not an absolute ruler in the sense of later absolutism—at least in form: he could not declare war or sign a peace treaty without the consent of the Corona de Logu. However, that was composed primarily of the nobility's relatives and, therefore, linked by common interests.

The succession to the throne was dynastic, but in some cases, there was the possibility of election by the Corona De Logu.

=== The judicial chancellery ===
In the government of the territory, the Judge was assisted by the Chancellery. The sovereign authority was, in fact, formalized with the drafting of official acts called bullata paper, written by the statal chancellor, usually a bishop or at least a senior member of the clergy, assisted by other officials called majores.

=== Local administration ===
==== Curadorias ====
Curadorias

The territory of various kingdoms was divided into curadorias, administrative districts of varying sizes formed by urban and rural villages, dependent on a capital which housed the curadore. These administrators, aided especially by jurados (judges) and a council, the Corona de curatoria, represented the judicial authority locally and tended to the public property of the Crown.

The curadore appointed for each village was part of the curadorias a majore de Bidda (the modern equivalent of a mayor) with administrative and judicial powers, and direct responsibility for the successful actions of land management.

=== Law ===
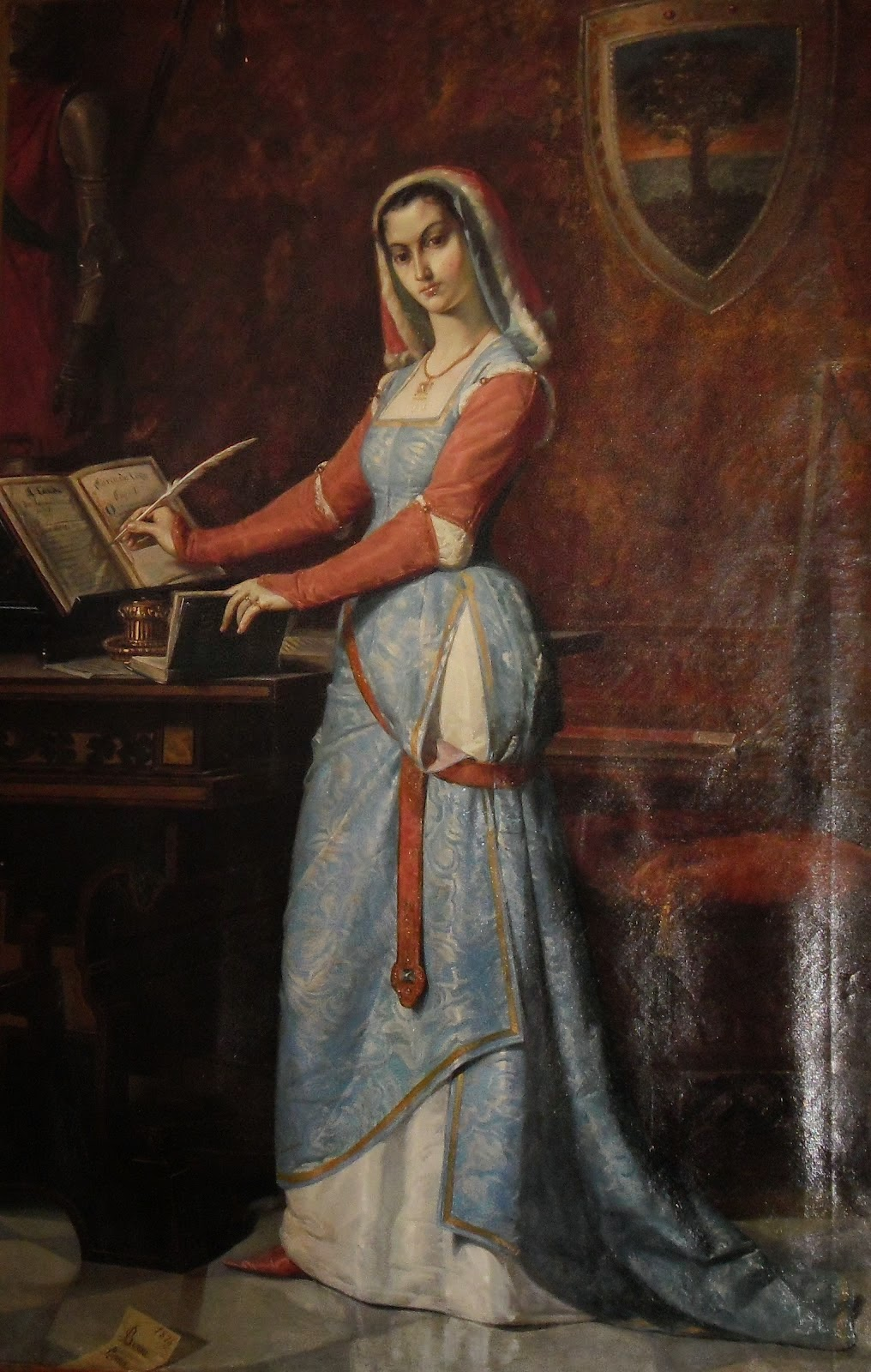
Eleanor of Arborea signing the Carta de Logu

The Cartas de Logu are collections of penal, public, civil and land regulations of great importance, in force in the various Giudicati. Unfortunately, only a few parts of the Carta Caralitana have been preserved. The Carta de Logu of the Giudicato of Arborea marks, towards the end of the fourteenth century, the birth of a rule of law by Mariano IV first and then by his daughter Eleonora, who extended the scope of the rules to adapt them to a changed reality in social conditions. The Chart is written in Sardinian (of the Logudorese variety), and from this, we can deduce the judicial intent to actually make it known to citizens in order to make them aware of lawful and unlawful behaviours, with the consequent criminal implications. A situation of legal certainty is therefore defined.

The chart survived, albeit with some difficulty, the judicial period and remained in force in the Spanish and Savoyard era until the enactment of the Code of Carlo Felice in April 1827. From the study of the Chart, we can deduce a great attention of the Giudicati towards the protection of the safety of the countryside and agricultural production, including horse breeding and leather production, even to the detriment of sheep farming. This denotes a great attention towards the productive base, which supports the efforts of the enemies in the struggle for the independence of Sardinia.

The Condaghes are also of great importance for the study of the judicial period between the 11th and 13th centuries. The term is of Byzantine origin (kontakion – stick on which cards sewn together were rolled up), which defines the register on which the parchments of the deeds of donation to monasteries or other ecclesiastical bodies were transcribed. In them, the sums of money, the servants, the maids, the cultivated lands, the vineyards, the wooded areas (the salts), the pastures and the livestock donated by the local nobility were reported in great detail. From the Condaghes, it was possible to reconstruct a large part of the judicial dynamics known to us, as well as being the most ancient evidence of the ancient Sardinian vernacular.

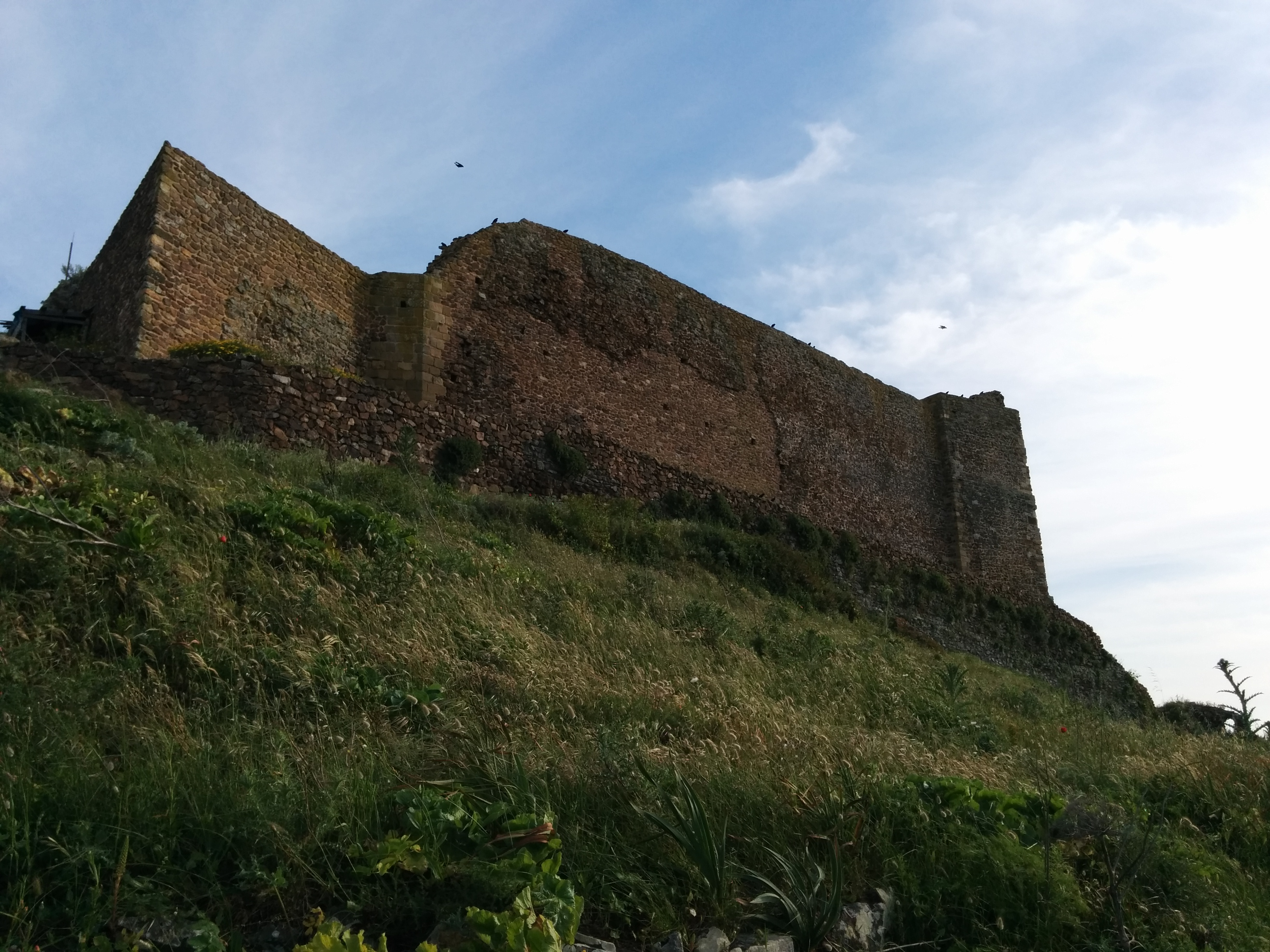
Castle of Monreale, Sardara

== Judicial army ==
The Sardinian judicial armies were composed of troops made up of soldiers and free citizens, subject to periodic rotation. In an emergency, forced conscription was used. The elite corps was made up of so-called bujakesos, chosen riders who served under the command of the Majore de Janna, the commander in charge of the security of the sovereign. The main armaments were the sword, chain mail, the shield, the helmet, and the birrudu, a weapon similar to the ancient verutum, the Roman javelin.

The militias of the ground and the infantry (birrudos) used a shorter version of this same weapon. Besides the use of spears and shields, another common weapon was the leppa, a sword with a bone handle and curved blade, between 50 and 70 cm long, which was still in use, in a more contained dimension, until the end of the nineteenth century. In Sardinia, a type of longbow was made, and over time, the use of the crossbow spread.

In case of conflict, judges often used mercenary troops, such as the dreaded Genoese crossbowmen.

== Culture ==
=== Religion ===
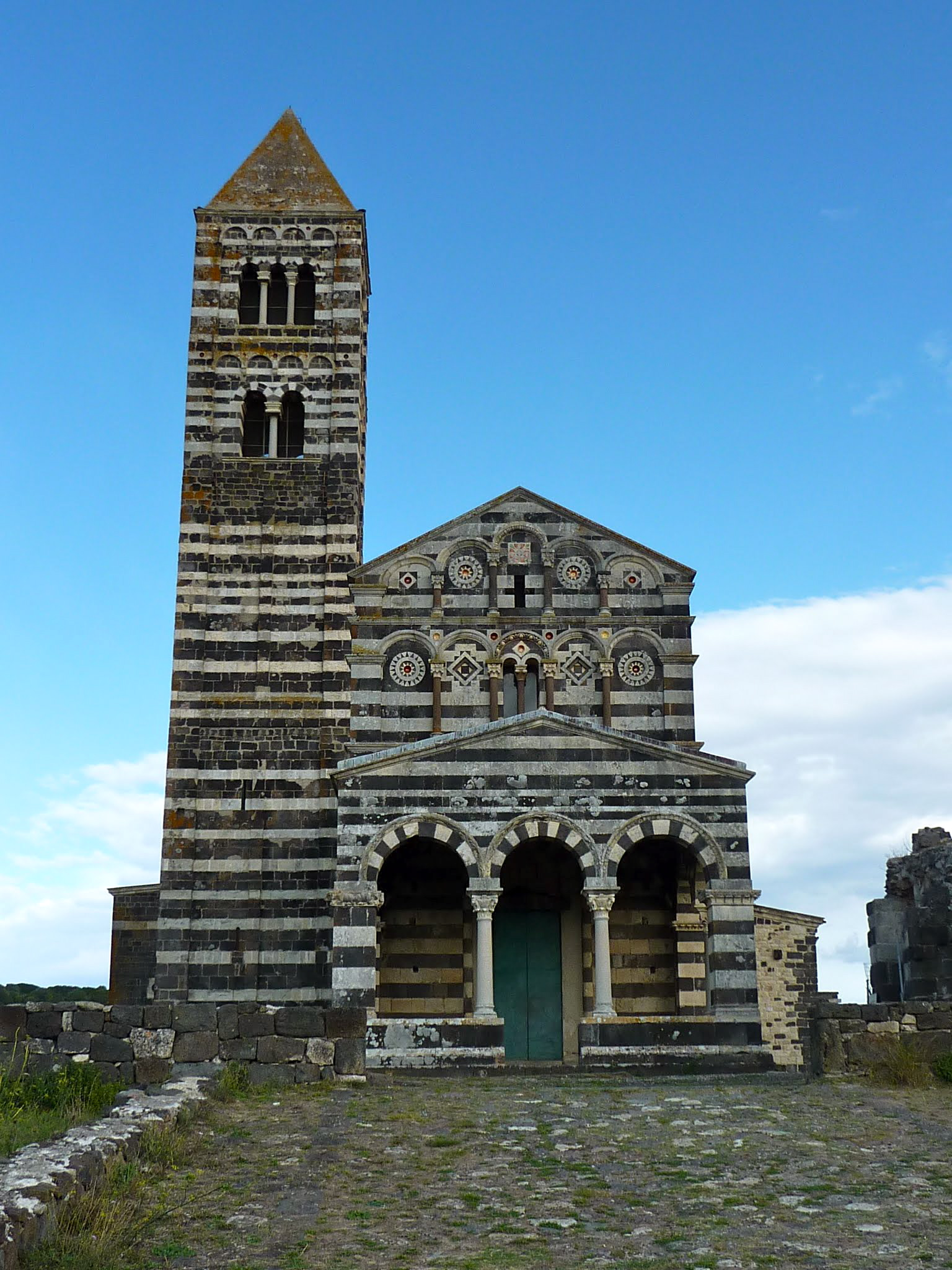
Basilica di Saccargia

Christianity spread throughout most of the island in the early centuries, excluding much of the Barbagia region. At the end of the sixth century, Pope Gregory I reached an agreement with Hospito, chief of the barbaricini, that guaranteed the conversion of his people from paganism to Christianity. Since Sardinia was in the political sphere of the Byzantine Empire, it developed an array of Greek and Eastern Christianity traits as a result of evangelisation by Basilian monks.

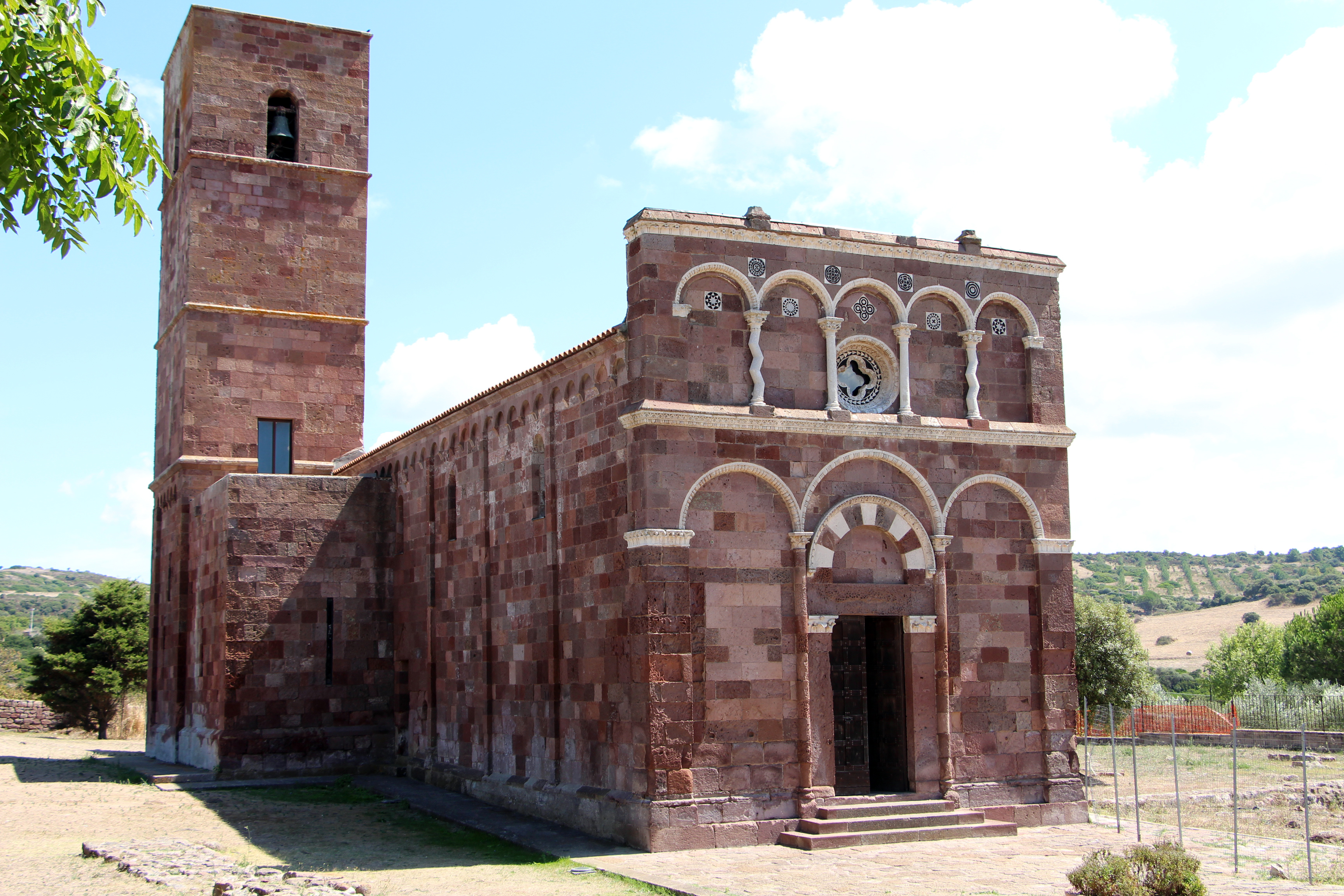
Nostra Signora di Tergu

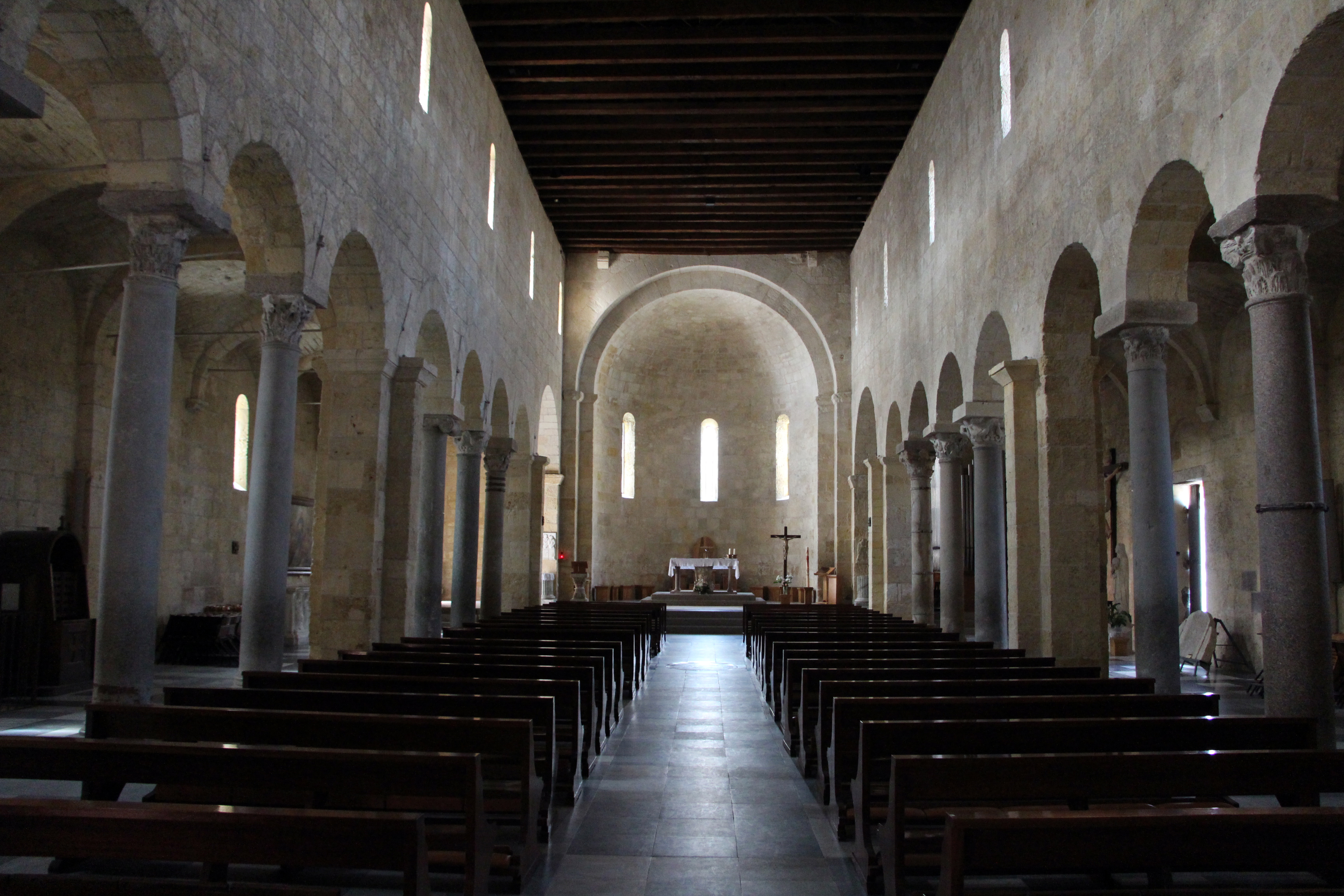
Basilica of San Gavino

The Sardinian Church was an autocephalous institution for five centuries, independent from both the Byzantine and the Roman Curia. In the eleventh century, after the schism of 1054, the judikes, according to Pope Alexander II, began a policy for the development of Western monasticism on the island, with the aim of a wider dissemination of culture but also of new techniques for cultivating the land. The immigration of monastics to the island was fueled by donated funds, and local churches were built by the judicial aristocracy. However, there were still strong ties with the Eastern liturgy. In 1092, a papal bull expressly abolished the autonomy and autocephaly of the Church of Sardinia, which was placed under the primacy of the Archbishop of Pisa.

The first act of donation was made in 1064 by Barisone I of Torres who gave the Benedictine monks of Monte Cassino a large area of its territory with churches (including the Byzantine church of Nostra Segnora de Mesumundu), not far from the then capital of Ardara. For several centuries afterwards, representatives of many religious orders including the monks of the Abbey of Montecassino, the Camaldolese, the Vallombrosians, the Vittorini of Marseille, the Cistercians of Bernard of Clairvaux arrived and settled in Sardinia. As a result of this, Romanesque architecture flourished on the island.

=== Language ===
Byzantine Greek was used as an administrative language during the Byzantine period, but fell into disuse. Latin, which had long been the language of the native population, developed into the Sardinian language and became the official language. It was also used in legal and administrative documents such as the condaghe, municipal statutes, and the laws of the kingdoms, such as the Carta de Logu.

== Pisan-Genoese and Aragonese interference and end of the four kingdoms ==
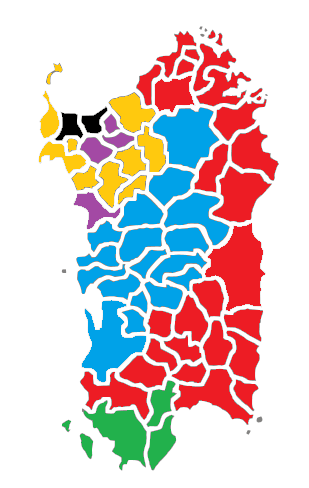
In red the Sardinian territories controlled directly by Pisa in the early 14th century, before the Aragonese invasion, green the Della Gherardesca, in blue the Giudicato of Arborea, in purple the Malaspina, yellow the Doria, in black the comune of Sassari

Pisa and Genoa began to infiltrate the Judicial politics and economy in the eleventh century, intervening to support the giudicati, against the Taifa of Dénia, an Iberian Muslim kingdom, which was trying to conquer the island.

From the second half of the thirteenth century, the autonomous existence of the kingdoms of Logudoro, Gallura and Calari ended due to the diplomatic manoeuvres of Genoa and Pisa on the territory, on trade, on the episcopal curiae, and the judicial chancelleries. The Kingdom of Logudoro ended effectively in 1259 with the direct management of its territories by the Doria and the Malaspina Genoese families. Cagliari was conquered by a Pisan-Sardinian alliance in 1258, and its territory was divided between the winners. Gallura went to the Visconti family and then to Pisa in 1288.

Arborea lasted longer and, between 1323 and 1326, participated in an alliance with the Crown of Aragon at the conquest of the Pisan possessions in Sardinia (the former kingdoms of Gallura and Calari). However, threatened by the Aragonese claims of suzerainty and consolidation of the rest of the island, in 1353 the Kingdom of Arborea, under Marianus IV of Arborea, broke the alliance with the Aragonese and together with the Doria declared war against the Iberians. In 1368, an Arborean offensive succeeded in nearly driving the Aragonese from the island, reducing the Kingdom of Sardinia to just the port cities of Cagliari and Alghero and incorporating everything else into their own kingdom. A peace treaty returned the Aragonese to their previous possessions in 1388, but tensions continued. In 1391, the Arborean army, led by Brancaleone Doria, again conquered most of the island, subjecting it to Arborean rule. This state of affairs lasted until 1409, when the army of the Kingdom of Arborea suffered a heavy defeat at the hands of the Aragonese army in the Battle of Sanluri.

The Kingdom of Arborea ceased to exist in 1420, after the sale of its territories to the Aragonese by the last judge, William II of Narbonne, for 100,000 gold florins.

== See also ==
- Castles of Sardinia
- Petty kingdom

== Bibliography ==
- Solmi, A. (1965). Studi storici sulle istituzioni della Sardegna nel Medioevo [Historical studies on Sardinian institutions in the Middle Ages] (in Italian). Cagliari: Società storica sarda.
- Casula, Francesco Cesare (1990b). La storia di Sardegna [The History of Sardinia] (in Italian). Sassari.
