= Basilica of San Gavino =

Romanesque church in Porto Torres, Sardinia, Italy

Coordinates: 40°49′56″N 8°24′03″E

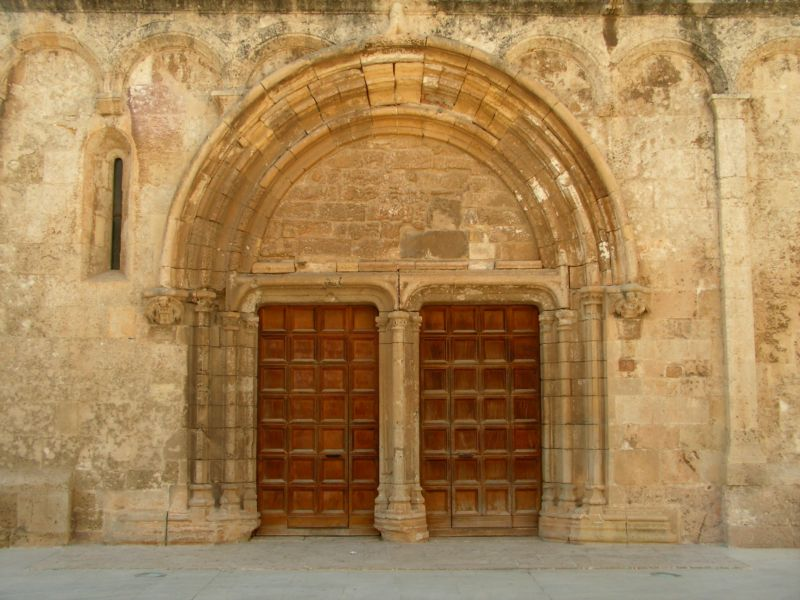
The main portal (15th century).

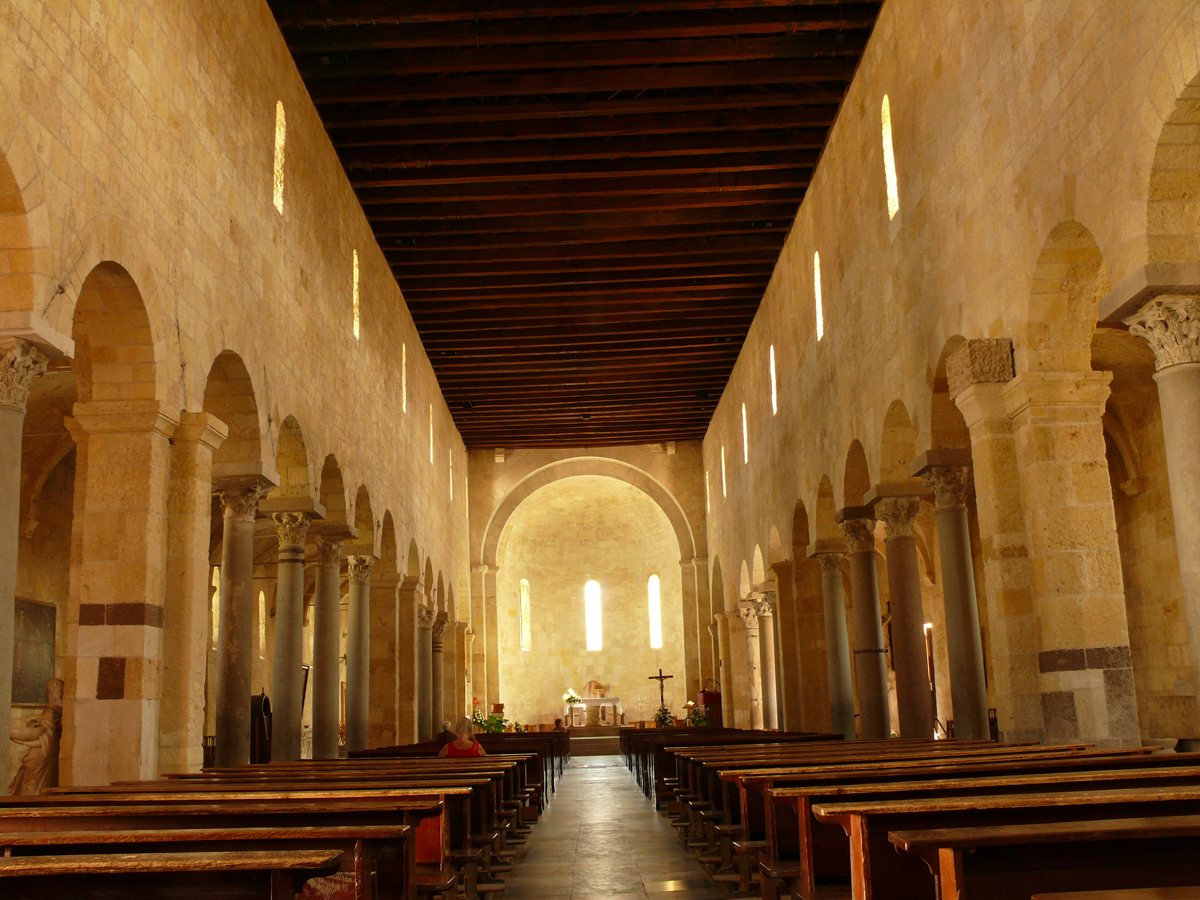
Interior of the church.

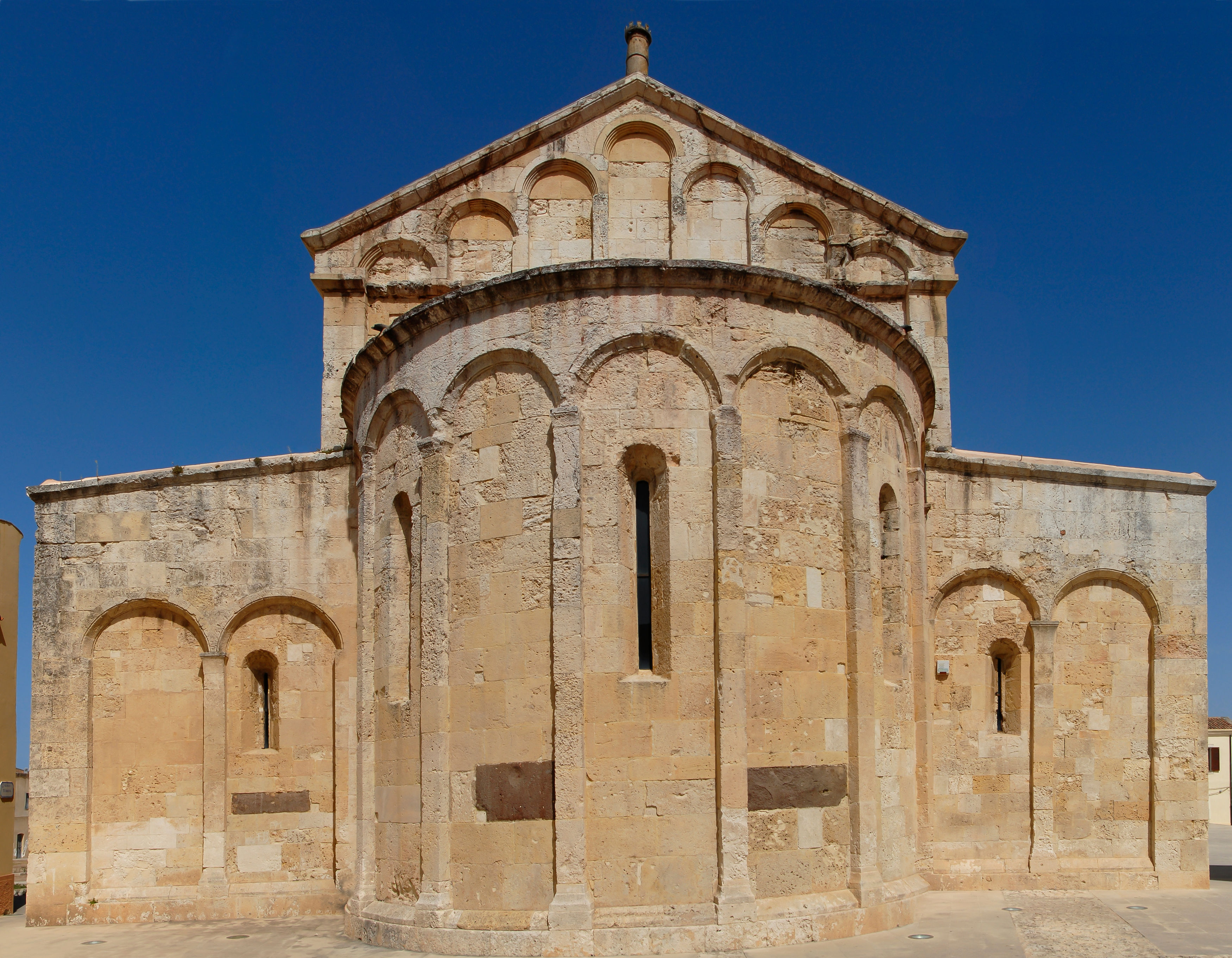
Exterior of the basilica

The Basilica di San Gavino (Basilica of Saint Gabinus) is a proto-Romanesque church in Porto Torres, Sardinia, Italy. A former cathedral, it is now a place for the veneration of local martyrs and a parish church.

== History ==
Turris Libisonis (Latin: Turris Libyssonis, present day: Porto Torres) was a bishopric seat from 489 until 1441, when the see was moved to nearby Sassari. The basilica is located in the Monte Angellu section of Porto Torres; an area where archaeological excavations have found a Paleo-Christian necropolis and two ancient basilicas, dating to the 5th – 7th centuries AD; one of which was built over the tomb of Saint Gabinus whose remains are interred in the present church.

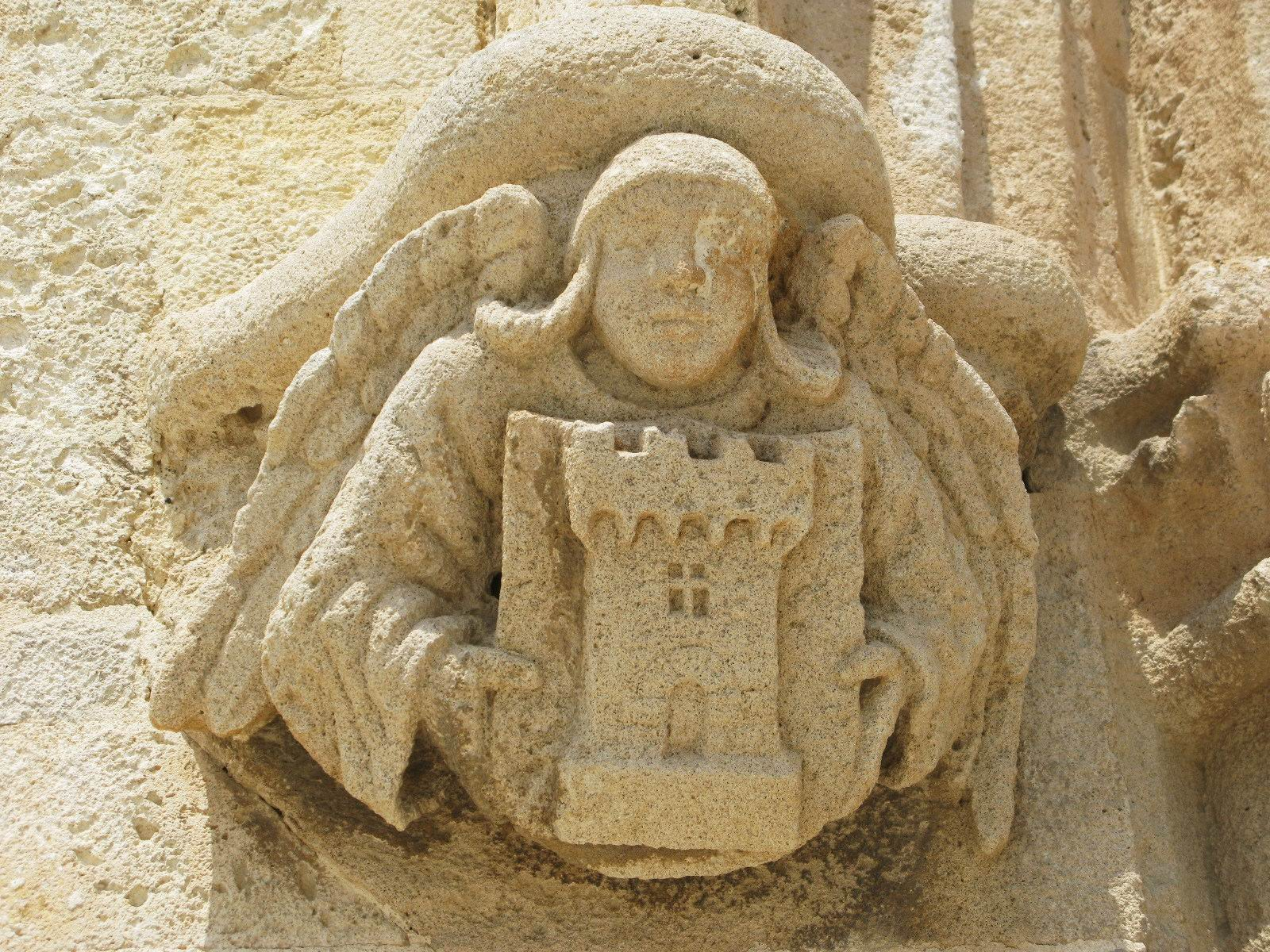
Coat of arms of the Giudicato of Torres, in the church exterior.

The earliest known document mentioning the church dates to 1065. According to it, the church was founded in the early 11th century by Gonario I, giudice (duke) of Torres and Arborea, who commissioned the work to Pisan masters. The construction continued under his son Barisone I, and was inaugurated by the giudice Marianus I of Arborea and archbishop Constantine of Castra in 1080.

An epigraph in the Romanesque portal testifies restoration work in the 15th century, which introduced Catalan-Gothic elements.

In the 18th century the crypt was renovated to house the remains of Torres' martyrs found in 1614.

== Description ==
=== Exterior ===
The church is located between two courtyards, known as atrio Comita and atrio Metropoli. In the southern side is the main entrance, a 15th-century portal in Catalan Gothic style. It is surmounted by a rounded arch supported by two columns, whose capitals have angels with coats of arms.

The church has two apses, one on each shorter side of the rectangular plan. The exterior is decorated by blind columns and Lombard bands. The ceiling is covered with lead plates.

=== Interior ===
The interior has a nave and two aisles separated by two series of rounded arches which are supported by twenty-two columns, taken from ancient edifices, in gray marble and pink granite, and three pairs of cruciform pilasters. Most of the capitals are of Roman origin. The nave is some three time wider than the aisles, and is covered by wooden trusses; the aisles have instead cross vaults.

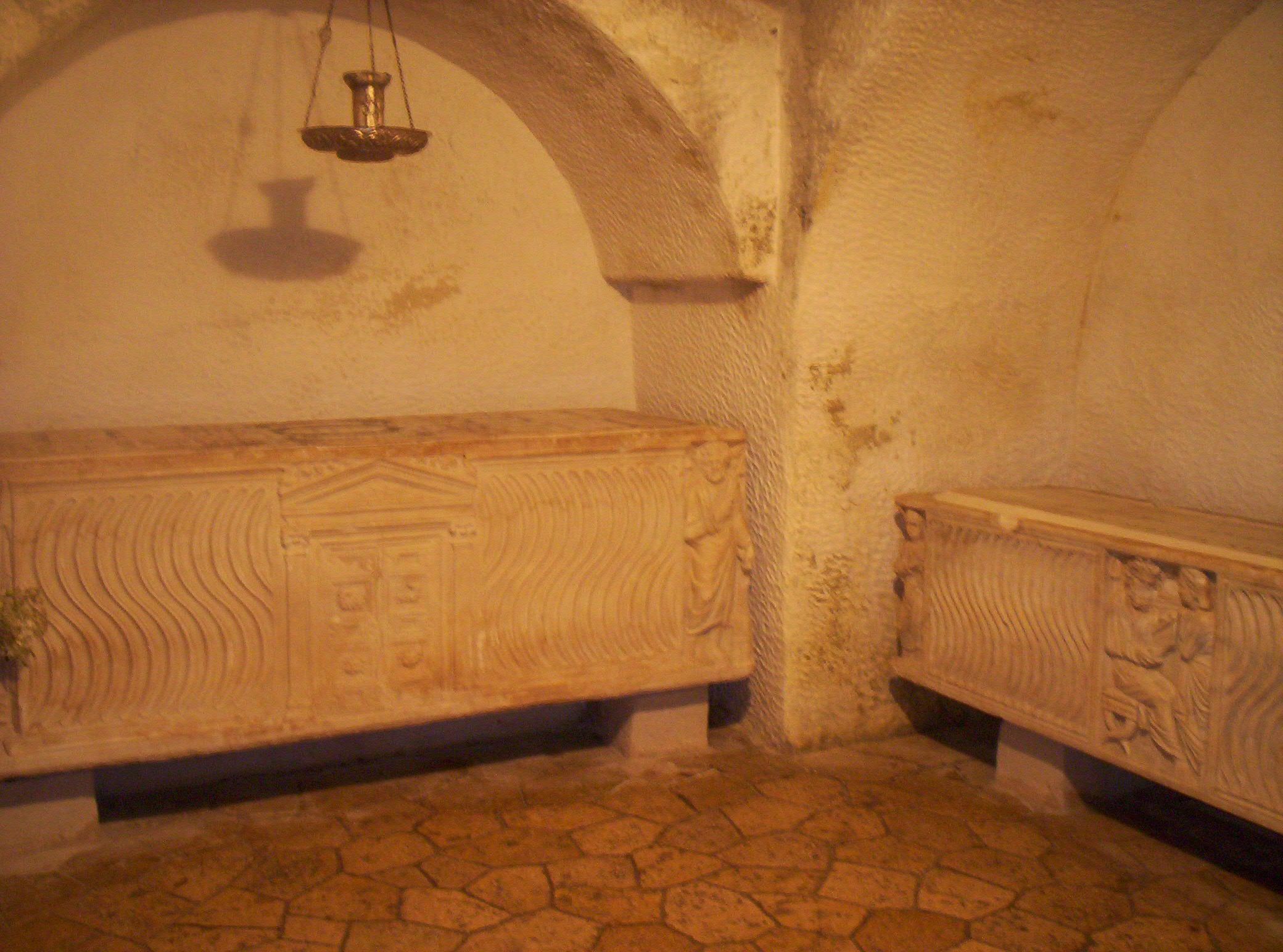
Roman sarcophagi housing the alleged remains of St. Gabinus and St. Ianuarius.

The high altar, which until the 19th century was in the middle of the nave, is now in the south-western apse; the opposing apse has a wooden catafalque of the 17th century, housing polychrome statues of the martyrs Gabinus, Protus and Ianuarius.

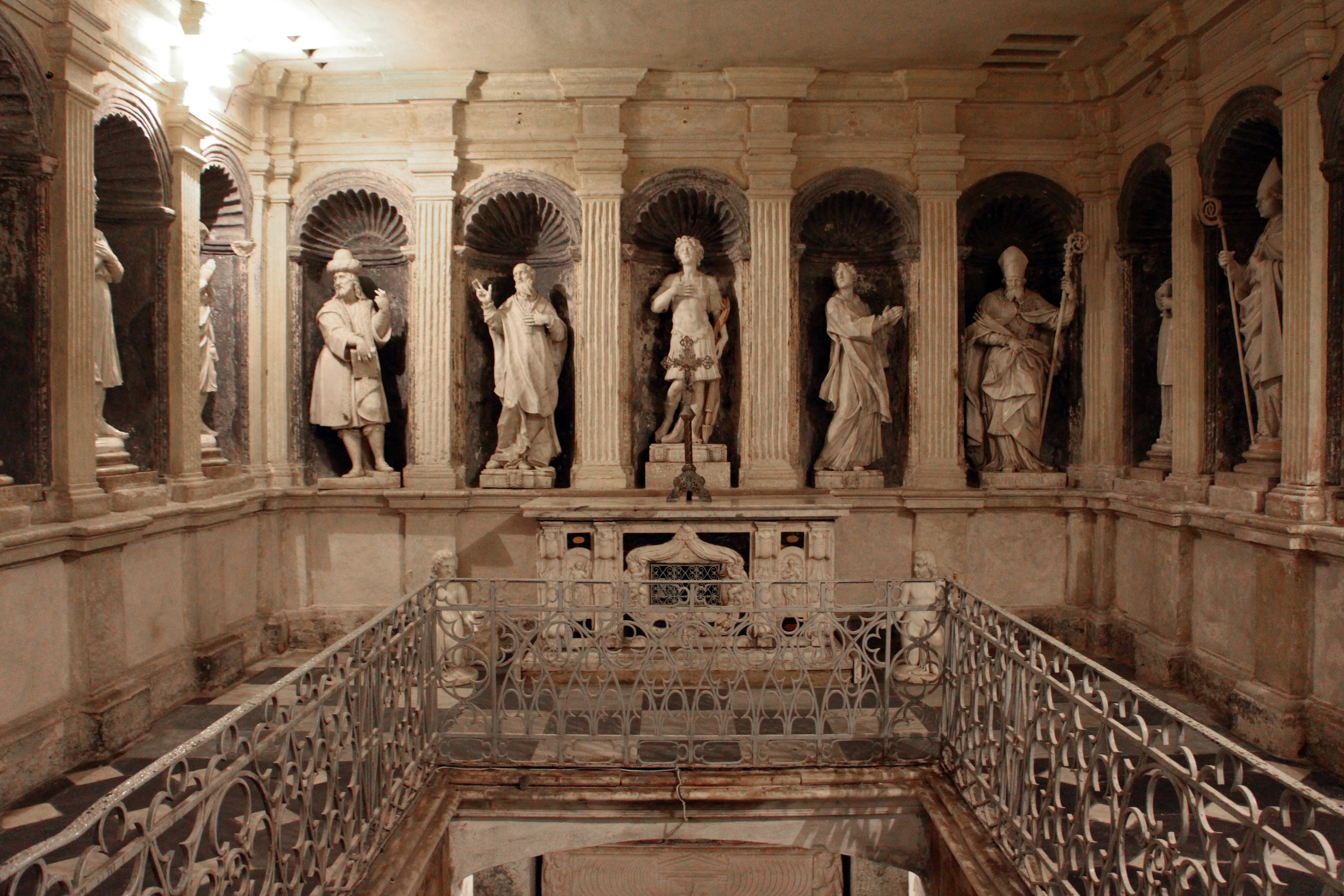
The anti-crypt

The aisles led to the anti-crypt, in Renaissance style with statues of martyrs, and the crypt, which houses ancient Roman sarcophagi; the latter in turn house remains attributed to the Turres' martyrs.

== See also ==
- Romanesque architecture in Sardinia

== Sources ==
- Coroneo, Roberto (1993). Architettura Romanica dalla metà del Mille al primo '300. Nuoro: Ilisso. ISBN 88-85098-24-X.
