= Ugo da Parlascio Ebriaco =

Ugo da Parlascio Ebriaco (died 30 May 1136) was a leading citizen in the Republic of Pisa in the early twelfth century. A Christian convert, he was of Jewish descent, the son Pagano Ebriaci, who was the son of Yosef ben Hezekiah. Yosef was the son Hezekiah ben David. Ugo is the ancestor of Elizabeth of York.

Sometime between 1113 and 1115, Ugo and Pietro Moriconi, Archbishop of Pisa, led a successful expedition against the Balearic Islands. They stopped in Porto Torres on their return and it was there that they established relations with Constantine I of Logudoro.

Around 1128, Gonario II, Constantine's son, the child ruler of Logudoro, was brought to Porto Torres by his regent, Ittocorre Gambella, after an attempt to harm the child had been made by the Athen family. Porto Torres was then controlled by the Pisans, who whisked the child off to Pisa and the protection of Ebriaco. When Gonario turned seventeen, he married Ebriaco's daughter and returned to Sardinia, with Pisan permission and four armed galleys. Ugo was part of this expedition to repossess the Logudoro in 1130. Together they landed at Torres and marched on Ardara, the location of the judicial palace, and took it. Controlling the giudicato again, they began construction of a castle at Goceano to guard the frontier.

== Sources ==
- Caravale, Mario (ed). Dizionario Biografico degli Italiani: LVII Giulini – Gonzaga. Rome, 2001.
