= Vittori =

Vittori is a surname. Notable people with the surname include:

- Arturo Vittori (born 1971), Italian architect
- Carlo Vittori (1931–2015), Italian sprinter and athletics coach
- Carlo Roberti de' Vittori (1605–1673), Italian Roman Catholic cardinal
- Dario Vittori (1921–2001), Argentine actor
- Gail Vittori (born 1954), co-director of the Center for Maximum Potential Building Systems
- Girolamo Vittori (17th century), Italian Hispanist and lexicographer
- Joseph Vittori (1929–1951), United States Marine
- Loreto Vittori (1600–1670), Italian castrato and composer
- Nicolò Vittori (1909–1988), Italian rower
- Paolo Vittori (born 1938), Italian basketball player and coach
- Pascal Vittori (born 1966), New Caledonian politician
- Roberto Vittori (born 1964), Italian air force officer and astronaut
- Umberto Vittori (1906–1977), Italian rower

== See also ==
- Vittorini
- Di Vittorio
