= Orzocorre I of Arborea =

Orzocco I
- Judge of Arborea
- Reign: 1070 – 1100
- Successor: Torbeno of Arborea
- Born: 11th century
- Died: 1100
- Issue: Torbeno; Orzocorre II
Names
- Orzocco I de Lacon-Zori
- Dynasty: Lacon-Zori
- Father: Marianus I

Orzocorre I (also spelled Onroco or Orsocorre; perhaps born as Torbeno) was the Judge of Arborea from circa 1070 (at least by 1073) to circa 1100 and is the first ruler of Arborea about whom anything substantial is known. He was the founder of an Arborean dynasty which reigned until 1185. He succeeded Marianus I, about whose government nothing is known, though some presume that Orzocorre was his son. If true, this would make Orzocorre a member of the Thori family.

After it was destroyed in a war, Orzocorre moved the capital of Arborea from Tharros to Aurestanni (Oristano), where it remained for the next three centuries. He also built a church dedicated to Saint Nicholas at Ottana.

Orzocorre ruled at a time when Western monasticism and the Gregorian reform were bringing Sardinia closer to the rest of Europe. Like his contemporary judges — Barison I and Constantine I of Logudoro, Torchitorio I and Constantine I of Cagliari, and Torchitorio of Gallura — he was an ally of the Church in order to improve the conditions — intellectual, political, religious, economic — of his giudicato. In 1074 and 1080, Pope Gregory VII wrote two letters to Orzocorre ordering the clerics of Arborea to shave their beards, as was the Western custom. James, Archbishop of Cagliari, refused to comply with papal orders and was deprived of his authority. Gregory granted Orzocorre the authority to seize the assets of those clerics who refused to shave.

He was married to Nivata (also Nibatta or Nigata) and had two sons, Torbeno and Orzocorre II, each of whom succeeded him in turn.

== Sources ==
- Manno, Giuseppe (1835). Storia di Sardegna. P.M. Visaj.
- Fara, G. F. De Rebus Sardois.

Preceded by Marianus I	Judge of Arborea c. 1070 – c. 1100	Succeeded by Torbeno
