= Barison =

Barison may refer to:

- Barison Peninsula, on the Antarctic Peninsula
- Barison II of Arborea (died 1186), ruler of a Sardinian kingdom
- Barisone I of Torres or Barison I (died 1073), ruler of a Sardinian kingdom
- Barisone II of Torres or Barison II (died 1191), ruler of a Sardinian kingdom
- Barisone III of Torres or Barison III (1221-1236), ruler of a Sardinian kingdom
- Giuseppe Barison (1853-1931), Italian artist
- Paolo Barison (1936-1979), Italian soccer player

== See also ==
- Barrison (disambiguation)
