= Marianus I =

Marianus I may refer to:

- Marianus I of Arborea (11th century)
- Marianus I of Torres (died after 18 March 1082)
