= Mariano I =

Mariano I may refer to:

- Mariano I di Zori (11th century)
- Mariano I de Lacon-Gunale (died after 18 March 1082)
