= Judge of Logudoro =

List of medieval rulers of Sardinia

The Judicates of Sardinia.

The kings or judges (iudices or judikes) of Logudoro (or Torres) were the local rulers of the locum de Torres or region (province) around Porto Torres, the chief northern port of Sardinia, during the Middle Ages.

The identity, number, relationships, and chronology of the kings up until about 1112 are poorly sourced and highly disputed among historians of the period.

- Gonario I (c. 1015 – c. 1038)
- Comita II (c. 1038 – c. 1060)
- Barisone I (c. 1060 – c. 1073) (Note: Andrew Tanca is separately listed with an overlapping reign of c. 1064 – c. 1073; sources do not agree on whether the two ruled jointly or in succession.)
- Andrew Tanca (c. 1064 – c. 1073)
- Marianus I (to c. 1082)
- Constantine I (c. 1082 – c. 1127)
- Gonario II (c. 1127 – 1153)
  - Saltaro (1127), pretender
  - Ittocorre Gambella (1127 – 1140), regent
- Barisone II (1153 – 1186)
- Constantine II (1186 – 1198)
- Comita III (1198 – 1218)
- Marianus II (1218 – 1233)
- Barisone III (1233 – 1236)
- Adelasia (1236 – 1259)
  - Ubaldo (1236 – 1238), husband
  - Enzio (1238 – 1272), husband

Partitioned between Arborea and the Doria.
