= Barisone =

Barisone may refer to:

- Barisone I of Torres, the giudice of Arborea from c. 1038 until c. 1060 and then of Logudoro until his death sometime c. 1073
- Barisone II of Arborea, the giudice of Arborea, a kingdom of Sardinia, from 1146 to 1186
- Barisone II of Gallura (died 1203), the Judge of Gallura from c. 1170 to his death
- Barisone II of Torres, (died 1191), the giudice of Logudoro from 1153 to 1186
- Barisone III of Torres (1221–1236), briefly the Judge of Logudoro from 1232 until his death
- Diego Barisone (1989–2015), Argentine footballer
