= Constantine II of Torres =

Constantine II
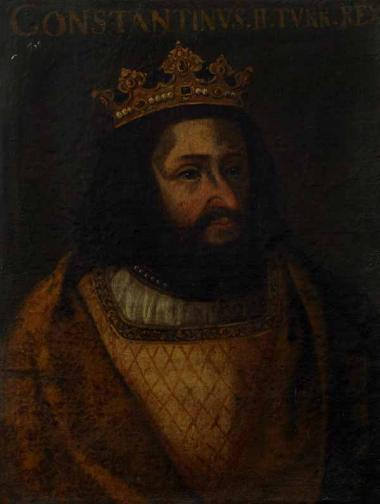

Judge/King of Logudoro/Torres
- Reign: 1190–1191
- Predecessor: Barisone II
- Successor: Comita II
- Died: 1191
- Spouse: Druda; Prunisinda
Names
- Constantine de Lacon-Gunale
- House: Lacon-Gunale
- Father: Barisone II, King of Torres
- Mother: Preziosa of Orrubu

Constantine II (died December 1198), called de Martis, was the giudice of Logudoro. He succeeded to the giudicato sometime between 1181 and 1191. He was the son of Barisone II and Preziosa de Orrubu. His father associated him with the government in 1170 and abdicated the throne to him around 1186. His reign was generally characterised by contemporary chroniclers as "tyrannical."

In the year before Constantine's succession, Logudoro and Arborea owed allegiance to the Republic of Genoa and Gallura and Cagliari to that of Pisa. When Barisone II of Arborea died in 1185, Pisa installed Peter of Serra, Barisone's eldest son, on the Arborean throne, while Genoa installed Hugh of Bas, a grandson. However, at the same time, Peter of Torres, the giudice of Cagliari and a brother of Constantine, revolted against the Pisans and expelled them, allying with Genoa against them and against Peter of Arborea. In 1189, a Pisan fleet under Obert, Margrave of Massa, invaded Cagliari and forced Peter to take flight to the court of his brother in Porto Torres. Obert's son William was installed as giudice in Cagliari. Hugh and Peter came to terms in Arborea, agreeing to rule it jointly.

On 10 June 1191, Constantine signed a treaty with Genoa and made peace with Cagliari. The treaty stipulated that Genoese merchants be guaranteed their property, citizenship, tax-free commerce, markets, and rights to justice in Logudoro. He further agreed to assist Genoa in its war against Pisa and Arborea. Together, William and Constantine invaded the condominium of Arborea. Hugh fled and Peter was captured by William. The two triumphant allies divided up Arborea between themselves. Genoa, not content with an alliance between Constantine and the neutral (neither Pisan- nor Genoese-supporting) William, coerced the former to make war on his erstwhile ally. Defeated, the giudice of Logudoro made peace and offered a strong alliance. William, not quick to forgive, instead invaded Logudoro and took the castle of Goceano, where Constantine's wife Prunisinda was residing. The archbishop of Pisa mediated an accord between the dueling princes, but Constantine broke the peace and recaptured Goceano, thus the archbishop excommunicated him (1194). In March 1196, Constantine was in Pisa to propose: William's return of Prunisinda and his own return of Goceano or Montiverro unless he paid 50,000 gold bezants. This plea failed.

On his deathbed, Constantine called for the archbishop of Torres to recommunicate him, but he died before the archbishop arrived. He was consequently buried outside of the giudical cemetery in Ardara until his brother Comita III of Torres had him reburied with a Christian ceremony.

Constantine's first wife was one Druda, a Catalan who died soon after arriving on the isle. His aforementioned second wife, Prunisinda, was also a Catalan and died still in prison in 1195. Constantine had no children, however, and was succeeded by his brother Comita.

== Sources ==
- Ghisalberti, Aldo (ed). Dizionario Biografico degli Italiani: XXX Cosattini – Crispolto. Rome, 1984.

Preceded by Barisone II	Giudice of Logudoro c. 1186 – 1198	Succeeded by Comita III
