= Nostra Signora di Tergu =

Church building in Tergu, Italy

Coordinates: 40°52′16″N 8°43′13″E

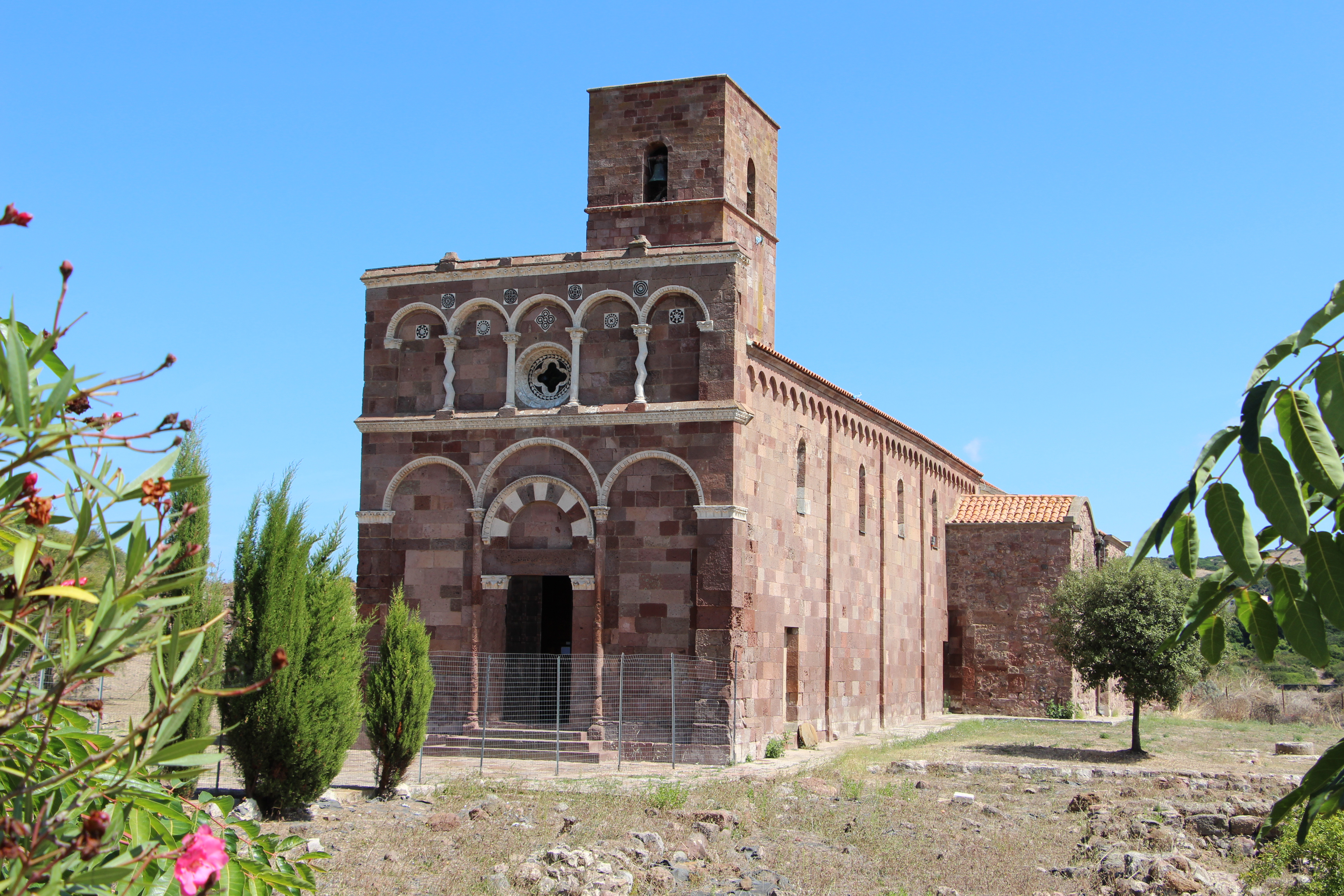
Nostra Signora di Tergu.

Nostra Signora di Tergu is a parish church in Tergu, province of Sassari, Sardinia, Italy. One of the most outstanding examples of Romanesque architecture in the island, the church and the remains of the annexed abbey are located in a countryside area outside the village.

The construction of the church is attributed to the Giudice of Torres Marianus I, who reigned from 1065 to 1082. In 1122 it was a possession of the abbey of Montecassino. It is mentioned in the Pseudocondaghe of Santa Maria di Tergu as having been consecrated in 1117, and built by workers from Pisa and Lombardy. In 1444 the church and the monastery became part of the archdiocese of Torres.

== Overview ==
The church was built using slabs of red trachyte and of brighter limestone for the decorations. The façade, which is missing the upper part (crumbled down during the centuries) is divided into two levels. The lower one has two corner pilasters and two semicolumns supporting two arches with finely decorated archivolts in limestone. The central portal has an architrave with capitals, also in limestone, sculpted with acanthus motifs.

The vegetable motifs are also present in the white frames of the upper level, showing a blind loggia with five arcades, in which are contained unusual geometrical decorations. Also particular are the side columns, having a zigzag pattern. The central arcade houses a small rose window.

The exterior sides are characterized by false columns with Lombard bands. On the northern side is the square, sturdy bell tower.

The interior is on the Latin cross plan, with a nave and a transept. The apse, with a quadrangular plan, was rebuilt in 1664. To the same age dated the barrel vault of nave, which has been replaced by the current wooden trusses.
