= Ittocorre Gambella =

12th-century Sardinian nobleman

Ittocorre Gambella was the regent of the Giudicato of Logudoro between 1127 and sometime before 1140.

When Constantine I died around 1127, he left his young son Gonario II under the regency of Ittocorre. When the Athen family tried to harm the young ruler, Ittocorre whisked him away to Porto Torres, and the protection of the Pisans, who took him to Pisa and the house of Ugo da Parlascio Ebriaco.
