= Pliny Fisk III =

American architect

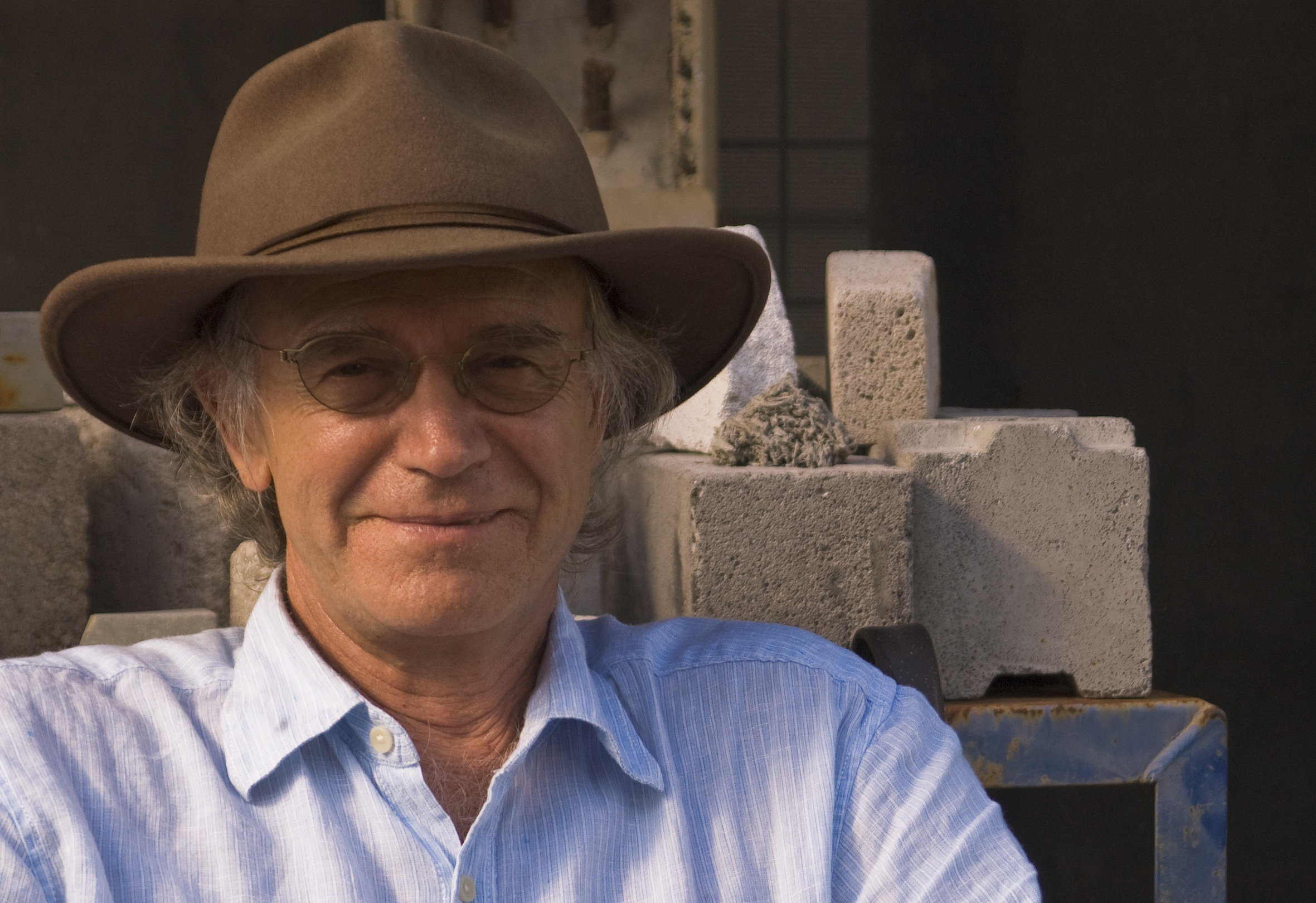
Photo by Lauren Jones

Pliny Fisk III (May 30, 1944 – July 27, 2026) was a co-founder and co-director of the Center for Maximum Potential Building Systems (CMPBS), a sustainable design and planning organization established in 1975. Fisk also served as Fellow in Sustainable Urbanism and Fellow in Health Systems Design at Texas A & M University, where he held a joint position as signature faculty in Architecture, Landscape Architecture and Planning. Fisk previously held positions at Ball State University, the University of Texas at Austin, Mississippi State University and the University of Oklahoma.

== Education and personal life ==
Fisk received B.Arch., M.Arch., and M.L.Arch. degrees from the University of Pennsylvania. His graduate studies focused on ecological land planning under the guidance of Ian McHarg. His work was influenced substantially by Russell Ackoff in various disciplines associated with the systems sciences.

He has four children and was married to Gail Vittori.

== Work ==
Fisk's contributions in the research field were principally in materials and methods; from low-cost building systems development (referred to as "open building") to wide-ranging material development (that includes: low carbon and carbon balanced cements, and many other low impact materials). He developed an early input/output life-cycle assessment model for material flow in the U.S. and connected this to GIS, so that human activities can be placed into the context of natural systems on a national scale. The model represented greenhouse gases, criteria air pollutants and toxic releases of more than 12,500,000 businesses. He also developed an alternative land planning and design methodology (referred to as Eco-Balance Design and Planning).

=== Early work ===
After completing his education at University of Pennsylvania, Fisk worked for Ian McHarg (in Philadelphia); and (in 1969) he assisted McHarg as the coordinator of engineering and ecology for New Orleans East, a new town of 100,000 on the Mississippi Delta. He served as an assistant professor at Ball State University for one year (1969–1970), before accepting a teaching position at The University of Texas at Austin.

=== Center for Maximum Potential Building Systems ===
In 1975 (with a seed grant from the Menil Foundation), Fisk and his then wife, Daria Bolton, founded the Center for Maximum Potential Building Systems (CMPBS) in Austin, Texas. CMPBS is a nonprofit 501(c)3 education, research, and demonstration organization.

The CMPBS site features demonstration projects including the Advanced Green Builder Demonstration Home (AGBDH), a 170 square meter structure built to demonstrate sustainable building techniques, including a 50,000 liter rainwater harvesting system and two methods of straw-bale construction. The AGBDH was the first modern building in the U.S. to use 100% Portland cement-free concrete, instead using a fly-ash/Caliche mix developed by CMPBS. The AGBDH was also designed for disassembly; pays particular attention to the lifecycles of water, energy and materials; and incorporates local and recycled materials. The AGBDH serves as the main offices for CMPBS.

Other examples of Fisk's work on the CMPBS site include the 2002 University of Texas at Austin entry for the Department of Energy Solar Decathlon competition, a later Texas A&M Solar Decathlon entry, the Greenforms erector-set prototype, and a foam and MgO cement modular building system.

Pliny Fisk co-directed CMPBS with his wife, Gail Vittori.

=== Crystal City, Nicaragua, and the Laredo Demonstration Farm ===
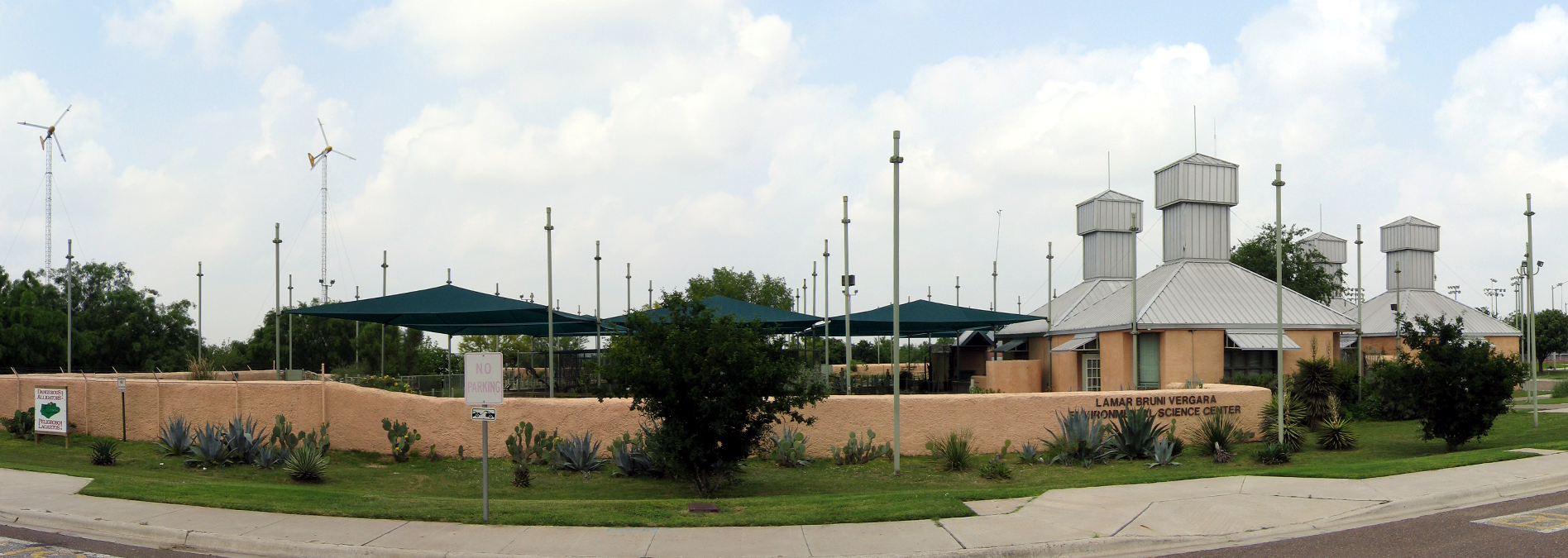
Site of Laredo Demonstration Farm, now the Lamar Bruni Vergara Environmental Science Center

When the Lo-Vaca Gathering Company shut off the natural gas supply to the small town of Crystal City, Texas, in the fall of 1977, Bolton and Fisk developed the idea of using Army surplus wood stoves and abundant mesquite for heating. By January 1978, Crystal City residents had installed nearly 1,000 wood stoves. In subsequent years, Bolton and Fisk led an effort to manufacture and install inexpensive solar hot water heaters using salvaged materials. The production of the solar collectors also helped bolster the job market of Crystal City.

In 1983, Fisk was sponsored by the Center for Investigation and Documentation of the Atlantic Coast (CIDCA) to set into motion a large scale indigenous housing program for the Miskito Indians of Nicaragua's Atlantic Coast. Fisk's goal in the project was to draw upon the available natural and human resources of the region to address an extreme housing shortage.

In 1991, the Texas Department of Agriculture (and Laredo Junior College) hired Fisk and CMPBS to design and build a demonstration farm (outside the South Texas city of Laredo).

=== City of Austin Green Building Program ===
In 1991, Fisk and Vittori developed "A Conceptual and Contextual Framework for the City of Austin" that served as the basis for the formation of the world's first municipal green building program (now operating as Austin Energy Green Building). The cooperative effort earned the United Nations Earth Summit Award for Exemplary Public Environmental Initiative, in 1992 (the only United States organization to receive recognition at the Earth Summit).

== Awards ==
In 2002 Fisk was awarded the U.S. Green Building Council’s first Sacred Tree Award in the public sector category. He was also a recipient of the Passive Solar Pioneer Award (from the American Solar Energy Society) and the National Center for Appropriate Technology’s 15th Year Distinguished Appropriate Technology Award, recognizing significant work in the field of environmental protection.

Fisk led two award-winning student teams for Department of Energy Solar Decathlon:

- in the 2002 (with the University of Texas at Austin);
- in the 2007 (with Texas A&M University).

The US Green Building Council honored Pliny Fisk with the USGBC Leadership Award for Organizational Excellence, in 2008: for his role as a founding member of the American Institute of Architects Committee on the Environment.

== Publications ==
- Center for Maximum Potential Building Systems: 35 Years of Serious Commotion
- Pliny Fisk III: Creating a Maximum Potential Future by Sam Martin.

== See also ==
Gail Vittori
Center for Maximum Potential Building Systems
