= Gonario I of Torres =

Gonario I Comita (also Gunnari, Gunnar, Gunnarius, Gonmar, Gunter, or Gunther) was the first known Judge of Logudoro and Arborea from perhaps as early as the late tenth century and as late as circa 1038. It is possible that he was the father of Barison I of Logudoro and Orzocorre I of Arborea.

The families of Torchitorio, Athen, Salanis, Kerki, Lacon, Gunale, Thori, Serra, Orrubu, and Sogostas can be identified in the Sardinia of his day, but to which he belonged is unknown. He had a sister named Giorgia and married Tocode. He made his capital at Tharros in Arborea.

Preceded by Unknown	Giudice of Arborea until 1038	Succeeded by Barisone I of Torres
Preceded by Unknown	Giudice of Logudoro until 1038	Succeeded by Barisone I of Torres
