= Gonario II of Torres =

12th-century Sardinian nobleman

Gonario II (Note: Numbered II because of the double name of the first judge, Gonario-Comita. It is usually considered that both names are numbered I, as Gonario II's son Comita also adopts the numbering II.)
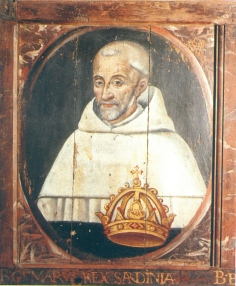

Judge/King of Logudoro/Torres
- Reign: 1128–1154
- Predecessor: Constantine I
- Successor: Barisone II
- Born: c. 1110
- Died: 1185 (aged 74–75); Clairvaux
- Spouse: Mary Ebriaco
- Issue: Barisone II, King of Torres; Pietro; Ittocorre; Comita II, King of Torres (possibly)
Names
- Constantine de Lacon-Gunale
- House: Lacon-Gunale
- Father: Constantine I, King of Torres
- Mother: Marcusa of Arborea/Mary of Orrubu

Gonario II (also spelled Gonnario and Gunnari; died between 1180 and 1190) was the giudice of the Sardinian kingdom of Logudoro (Note: From locum de Torres, so called from its principal city Porto Torres.) from the death of his father in 1128 until his own abdication in 1154. He was a son of Constantine I and Marcusa de Gunale. He was born between 1113 and 1114 according to later sources and the Camaldolese church of S. Trinità di Saccargia was founded in his name by his parents on 16 December 1112, though it was not consecrated until 5 October 1116.

Constantine died between 1127 and 1128, leaving his son under the regency of Ittocorre Gambella. When the Athen family tried to harm the young ruler, Ittocorre whisked him away to Porto Torres and the protection of the Pisans, who took him to Pisa and the house of Ugo da Parlascio Ebriaco. When he turned seventeen, he married Ebriaco's daughter (Note: Her name, Maria, is only known from a charter confirming the donation of the church of S. Michele in Therricellu to Montecassino on 20 May 1136. His predecessor, Barison I, had established the close relationship between the church of Logudoro and the monastery of Montecassino.) and returned to Sardinia with Pisan permission and four armed galleys. His father-in-law was part of this expedition to repossess his giudicato (1130). Together they landed at Torres and marched on Ardara, the location of the judicial palace, and captured it. Controlling the giudicato again, they began construction of a castle at Goceano to guard the frontier. At this time, Comita II of Arborea allied with the Republic of Genoa to defend himself from filopisano (Note: Meaning "Pisan-allied".) Logudoro, thus dividing the island's allegiance.

Gonario was among the first to do homage to the Pisan archdiocese for his giudicato. On 6 March 1131, Gonario did homage to Roger, Archbishop of Pisa, who was then acting papal legate on the island. In the previous year, Constantine I of Arborea, Comita's father, had done likewise. On 26 June 1132, Comita I of Gallura paid homage to Roger at Ardara, thus preliminarily establishing the legatine status of Gonario's principality. In 1135, Roger's successor, Uberto, declared Logudoro the base of the Sardinian legateship.

In 1144, Gonario got involved in a war with Arborea and, on 10 November, Baldwin, Archbishop of Pisa, moved to give him aid from the Republic. In 1145, Baldwin excommunicated Comita of Arborea. The Pisan prelate, travelling the island as a papal legate, had excommunicated the judge for oppressing the people and warring against Pisa, his rightful sovereign. Bernard of Clairvaux even weighed into island politics and sent a letter to Pope Eugene III to justify Baldwin's actions and commend Gonario as quia bonus princeps dicitur. (Note: Latin: who is called a good prince.) Nominally Arborea was transferred to Logudoro, but Comita died soon after and his son Barison II succeeded him. In 1146, this Barison hosted the consecration ceremony of Santa Maria di Bonarcado with most of the Arborean clergy and Villano, Archbishop of Pisa. Gonario and Constantine II of Cagliari also attended this ceremony, the only recorded instance of three out of the four Sardinian giudici being present in the same place at the same time.

On 24 June 1147, Gonario was in his twentieth year of rule as Gonnarius . . . Turritanorum Rex et Dominus. (Note: "Gonario, of Torres King and Lord.") This statement indicates that Gonario's rule was considered to begin with his father's death and was uninterrupted by exile and regency. In that year, Gonario left on the Second Crusade as a pilgrim to Jerusalem. He left his four sons, Barison, Peter, Ittocorre, and Comita as regents during his absence. He met Saint Bernard, who had only heard a good reputation earlier, on his return journey (1149). The two founded the Cistercian abbey of Cabuabbas di Sindia. Gonario probably extended this journey, making a pilgrimage to Saint Martin of Tours as well. (Note: This second pilgrimage is known, but it only fits the other knowns if it is posited as an extension of his return from Jerusalem.) Not long after this, Gonario, perhaps moved by his meeting with Bernard, abdicated the Logudorese throne and entered the monastery of Clairvaux.

== Notes ==
Preceded by Constantine I	Giudice of Logudoro; 1127 – 1154	Succeeded by Barison II
