= Basilica di Saccargia =

Basilica in Codrongianos, Sardinia, Italy

Coordinates: 40.671389°N 8.688889°E

Basilica della Santissima Trinità di Saccargia
- Front facade of the Basilica of Saccargia

- Location within Italy
- Location: Codrongianos, Sardinia, Italy
- Country: Italy
- Denomination: Roman Catholic
- Tradition: Latin Rite
- Website: Visit Saccargia

History
- Status: Active
- Consecrated: October 5, 1116

Architecture
- Functional status: Active
- Architect: Unknown
- Style: Pisan Romanesque
- Completed: 1116

Specifications
- Materials: Basalt, limestone

Administration
- Diocese: Archdiocese of Sassari

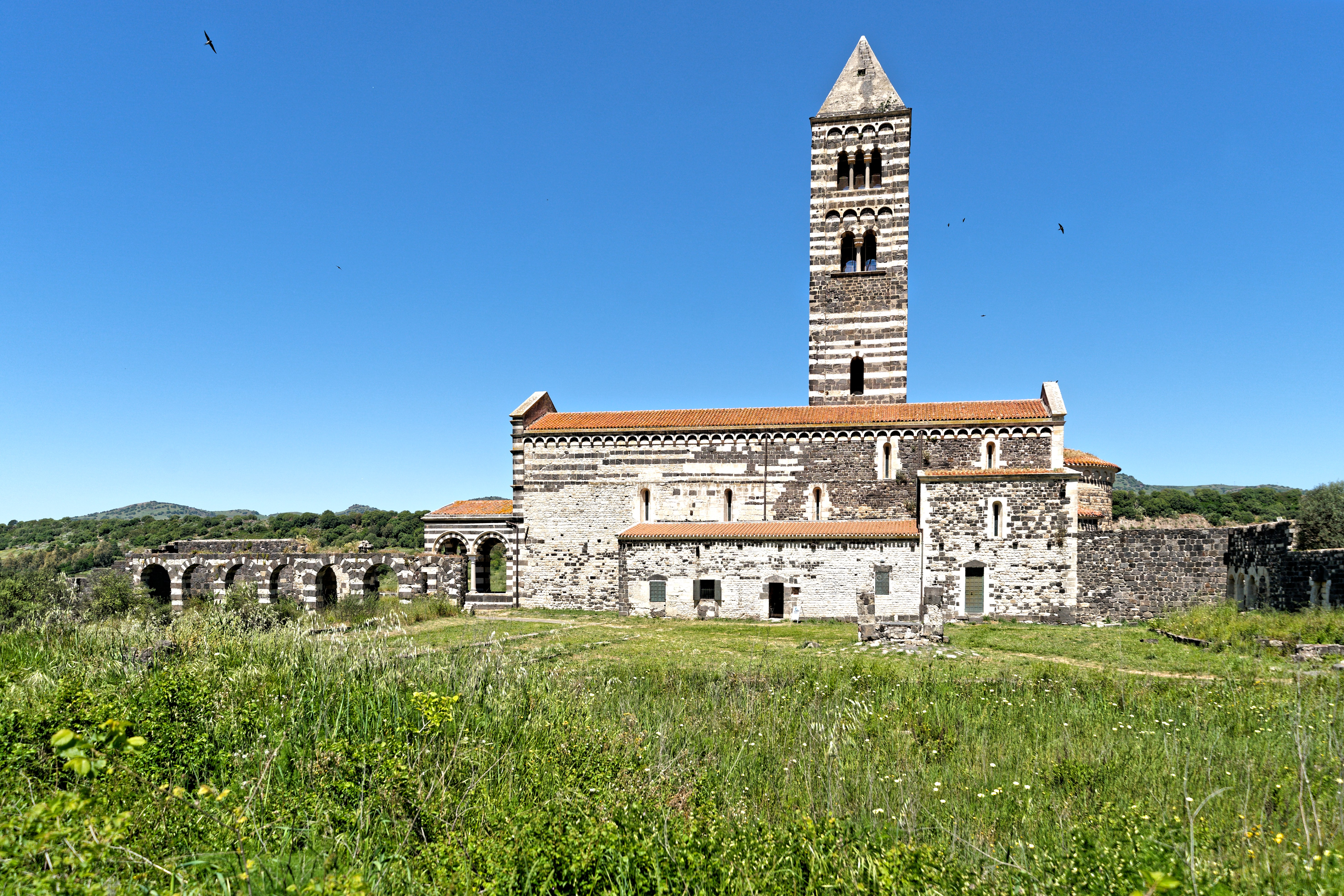
Side view

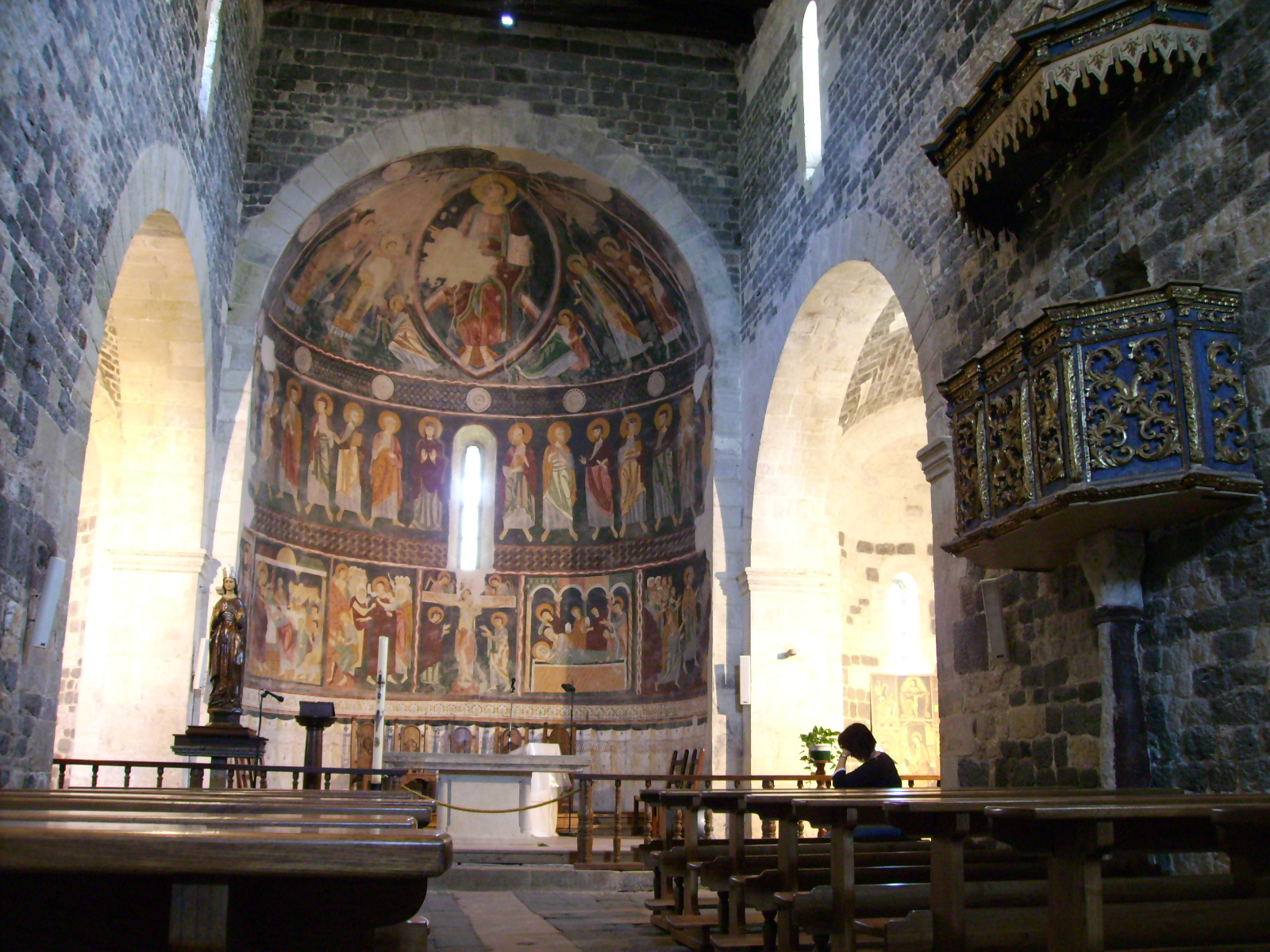
12th century frescoes in the interior

The Basilica della Santissima Trinità di Saccargia (Italian pronunciation: [baˈziːlika della sanˈtissima triniˈta ddi sakˈkardʒa]) (English: "Basilica of the Holy Trinity of Saccargia") is a church in the comune of Codrongianos, northern Sardinia, Italy. It is one of the most important Romanesque site in the island. The construction is entirely in local stone (black basalt and white limestone), with a typical appearance of Pisan Romanesque style.

== History ==
The church was finished in 1116 over the ruins of a pre-existing monastery, and consecrated on October 5 of the same year. Its construction was ordered by the giudice (judge) of Torres Constantine I. It was entrusted to Camaldolese monks who here founded an abbey. It was later enlarged in Pisane style, including the addition of the tall bell tower. The portico on the façade is also probably a late addition, and is attributed to workers from Lucca.

The church was abandoned in the 16th century, until it was restored and reopened in the early 20th century.

== See also ==
- Romanesque architecture in Sardinia
