= Gail Vittori =

Gail Vittori (born October 7, 1954) is co-director of the Center for Maximum Potential Building Systems, a non-profit design firm established in 1975 dedicated to sustainable planning, design and demonstration where she has worked since 1979.

== Work ==
Since 1993, Vittori has coordinated the center's Sustainable Design in Public Buildings Program, including serving as a sustainable design consultant for the Pentagon Renovation Program's Commissioning Team from 1999 to 2007, numerous City of Austin design projects including Texas's first public sector LEED certified building, the redevelopment of Austin's 709-acre (2.87 km^{2}) former Robert Mueller Municipal Airport including piloting LEED for Neighborhood Development, the new Austin federal courthouse, and the first LEED-Platinum certified hospital in the world, Dell Children's Medical Center of Central Texas.

Beginning in 2000, Vittori led several national initiatives focused on greening the health care sector and advancing environmental health considerations in green building. Examples include collaborating on the development of the American Society of Healthcare Engineering's (ASHE) Green Healthcare Construction Guidance Statement, and the Green Guide for Health Care, which she convened in 2002, a project of CMPBS and Health Care Without Harm. She served as a co-coordinator of the Green Guide for Health Care until 2011, and was founding chair of the U.S. Green Building Council's LEED for Healthcare core committee (2004–2008). Vittori was the 2009 chair of the U.S. Green Building Council's Board of Directors. In 2009, Secretary Janet Napolitano appointed Vittori to the Department of Homeland Security's Sustainability and Efficiency Task Force. In 2011, Vittori was appointed to the GBCI (Green Business Certification Inc.) Board of Directors, and served as its chair from 2014 to 2019. She is a founding board member of the Health Product Declaration Collaborative, and has served as vice-chair from 2015 to 2024.

In 1989, Vittori proposed a conceptual framework for what evolved as the City of Austin's Green Building Program, the only U.S. program recognized at the 1992 U.N. Earth Summit in Rio de Janeiro, and considered the first green building program in the world. Along with Pliny Fisk III, she oversaw the program's early stage development through 1992 in collaboration with the City of Austin. Austin's Green Builder Program influenced the formation of the U.S. Green Building Council and LEED, in addition to scores of policies throughout the U.S. and abroad. Additionally, from 1988 to 1998, she served on the city's Solid Waste Advisory Commission, six of those years as founding chair, a committee formed in response to a successful initiative co-coordinated by Vittori to cancel a proposed waste-to-energy municipal solid waste incinerator. Her work on establishing pay as you throw recycling residential programs, in addition to recycling programs for the city's commercial and multi-family sectors, has led Austin to having one of the nation's most successful recycling programs. Her work in this area continues with promoting zero waste by 2040, adopted by the Austin City Council in January 2009. Vittori served on the advisory boards of Natural Home magazine and Environmental Building News. She was the 2015 recipient of the Hanley Award for Vision and Leadership -- the only woman to receive that award, and, in 2020, received the U.S. Green Building Council's Kate Hurst Leadership Award.

== Books and selected media ==
- She is co-author, with Robin Guenther FAIA, of Sustainable Healthcare Architecture, published by Wiley and Sons in 2008 (ISBN 0471784044).
- A second edition of "Sustainable Healthcare Architecture" was published in 2013.
- Vittori was featured in Time magazine in March 2007. and, with Pliny Fisk III, in Texas Monthly's 35th anniversary issue (February 2008) in the article "35 People Who Will Shape Our Future".
- Center for Maximum Potential Building Systems: 35 Years of Serious Commotion

== Education and personal life ==
Vittori was a Loeb Fellow at Harvard University Graduate School of Design from 1998 to 1999, and attended the University of Massachusetts Amherst where she studied economics. She is married to Pliny Fisk III and has two children.
