= Barrison =

Barrison may refer to:

- Barrison Sisters, the sisters Barrison of Danish extraction, a vaudeville act from the late 19th century
- Mabel Barrison (1882-1912), American actress and singer
- Frances Louise Barrison, full name of Marvel Comics supervillainess Shriek

== See also ==
- Harrison and Barrison (1917 film), Hungarian comedy silent film
- Son Barry (1877-1959), AFL footballer
- Barison (disambiguation)
