= Marianus II =

Marianus II may refer to:

- Marianus II of Cagliari (died 1130)
- Marianus II of Torres (died 1233)
- Marianus II of Arborea (died 1297)
