= Saltaro of Torres =

12th-century Sardinian nobleman

Saltaro was a Sardinian nobleman during the Middle Ages, the son of Constantine I of Logudoro. His mother is unknown but may have been named Marcusa. Whether or not he is the same person as "Saltaro de Gunale", a pretender to the throne of Logudoro in 1127 during the reign of Gonario II, is also uncertain.

While still a young man, Saltaro took part in the Pisan expedition against the Moors of the Balearic Islands in 1114–1115. He was renowned for his handling of the ships and his participation brought honour to his father.

== Sources ==
- Manno, Giuseppe (1835). Storia di Sardegna. P.M. Visaj.
