= Torbeno of Cagliari =

Torbeno or Turbino (last mentioned 13 February 1130) was briefly Judge of Cagliari after Constantine I for an unknown period between 1090, when Constantine last appears in the sources, and 1108, when Constantine's son Torchitorio II first appears as judge.

Torbeno subscribed to a diploma in 1089 as the brother of the judge, then Constantine. Thus, he reigned between his brother and his nephew. At that time, the principle of hereditary succession was not established in Sardinia. Rather, the monarchy was elective. It appears that Torbeno was elected, probably with the support of the Republic of Pisa, over the pretensions of his young nephew. His reign saw great liberality with the treasury in granting lands and other gifts to Pisans, probably as the price of their alliance. He also funded the construction of a new duomo (cathedral) at Pisa.

In 1103, a donation was made by his nephew, then judge, to the church of San Lorenzo in Genoa recognising the assistance of six Genoese galleys under Ottone Fornari in recuperating Torchitorio's dominion. Probably the Genoese, inveterate enemies of Pisa, were only too happy to overthrow Torbeno. Torbeno's last donation was dated to 1103.

Nevertheless, Torbeno does appear in later acts of his nephews as a relative (consanguineus) of the judge. He was a leader, alongside Saltaro of Torres, of the Sardinian contingent of the Pisan expedition against the Almoravids of the Balearic Islands in 1113. On his return, he was compared to Nestor of Greek mythology.

== Sources ==
- Manno, Giuseppe (1835). Storia di Sardegna. P.M. Visaj.
