= Athen family =

Noble family from Sardinia

The Athen family was a noble family of Sardinia during the 11th and 12th centuries. It first appeared during the reign of Gonario I and was most prominent in the Giudicato of Logudoro.

In 1128, members of the Athen family, perhaps seeking to usurp the throne or perhaps just the regency, made an attempt to harm the young Gonario II of Logudoro. His regent, Ittocorre Gambella, quickly whisked him away from the palace and brought him to safety first at Porto Torres and second at Pisa. From this point on, the great families, like the Athen, fade into view to be replaced by the Repubbliche Marinare of northern Italy (Genoa and Pisa) in the power politics of Logudoro.
