= Torbeno of Arborea =

Torbeno or Turbino was the eldest son and successor of Orzocorre I as Judge of Arborea from about 1100 until his death.

His mother was Nivata or Nibatta or Nivatora. Torbeno himself married Anna de Lacon and was the father of Orzocorre II, who succeeded him.

Torbeno, with his son, signed a charter permitting his mother Nivata to dispose of the castles of Nuraghe Nigellu and Massone de Capras, which she had built, as she wished. She gave them to the Holy Roman Emperor, whom she states to have been Torbeno's suzerain, in perpetuity. According to another charter, which calls Torbeno "de Lacon" and his wife "de Zori," he purchased a red horse from Constantine "Dorrubu" (de Orrubu) at the cost of some slaves and some land in the vicinity of Nuraghe Nigello, which implies that perhaps Constantine was placed in charge of those places by Nivata. Some have supposed that this last charter was belonged to another Torbeno who was Judge of Arborea about the same time. Perhaps Orzocorre I was also called Torbeno.

Torbeno's charters are subscribed by the curators of Oristano, Valenza, Milis, Fortoriani (Fordongianos), and Usellus. The curator of Valenza was Comita of the powerful Lacon family to which Torbeno was related by marriage. The family was the most powerful in Sardinia at the time.

== Sources ==
- Manno, Giuseppe (1835). Storia di Sardegna. P.M. Visaj.
- Fara, G. F. De Rebus Sardois, II, "Arborenses judices."

Preceded by Orzocorre I	Judge of Arborea c. 1100	Succeeded by Orzocorre II
