= Torchitorio I of Cagliari =

Orzocco Torchitorio I
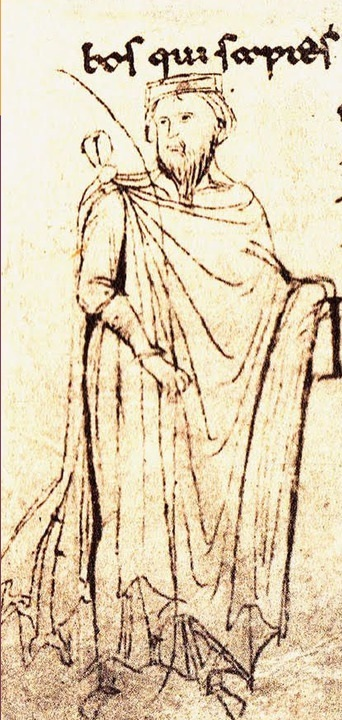
- Portrait of the monarch in the Registrum Petri Diaconi

Judge/King of Cagliari
- Reign: 1058-1089
- Predecessor: Marianus Salusio I
- Successor: Constantine I Salusio II
- Died: 1089
- Spouse: Vera of Lacon
- Issue: See list: Constantine I Salusio II, Judge of Cagliari; Peter; Sergius; Orzocorre; Gonario; Torbeno, Judge of Cagliari
- House: Lacon-Gunale
- Father: Marianus Salusio I

Orzocorre Torchitorio I (also spelled Orzocco and Torgodorio; died circa 1089) was the Judge of Cagliari (rex Sardiniae de loco Call.) from about 1058 to his death. At his time, the throne was customarily alternated between the Torchitorio de Ugunale and Lacon-Gunale families.

Torchitorio was judge at a time when Western monasticism was being introduced into Sardinia as part of the Gregorian reform of the Papacy. Cagliari, like the other giudicati, was placed under papal and Pisan authority. Torchitorio is thus one of the first judges of Cagliari about whom anything is known. He severely increased donations to the church and lent support to the monks of Monte Cassino who were arriving on the island to bring economic, technological, and religious renewal. Despite this, his attention to the church, the only portion of his policy handed down to us, has led to him being labelled "publicly useless" by certain historians. He was directed by Pope Gregory VII to force the clergy of the Archdiocese of Cagliari to shave their beards and attend to their churches, which the pope claimed were in neglect.

His wife was Vera and they succeeded in breaking tradition and passing the giudicato (judgeship) to their eldest son Constantine. Vera survived him and was alive in 1090. Their other sons were Peter, Sergius, Orzocorre, Gonario, and Torbeno. All died around 1125 except the last, who briefly usurped the throne from his brother, and was last heard of on 13 February 1130.

== Sources ==
- Manno, Giuseppe (1835). Storia di Sardegna. P.M. Visaj.
- Nowé, Laura Sannia. Dai "lumi" dalla patria Italiana: Cultura letteraria sarda. Mucchi Editore: Modena, 1996.

Preceded by Marianus I	Giudice of Cagliari c. 1058 – c. 1089	Succeeded by Constantine I
