= Di Vittorio =

Di Vittorio is a surname of Italian origin. Notable people with this surname include:

- Baldina Di Vittorio (1920–2015), Italian politician
- Giuseppe Di Vittorio (1892–1957), Italian syndicalist and communist politician
- Salvatore Di Vittorio (born 1967), Italian composer and conductor
- Carlo Roberti de' Vittori (1605–1673), Roman Catholic cardinal
