= Summa potestas =

Latin phrase meaning "highest authority"

Summa potestas is a Latin phrase meaning "highest authority" or "totality of power". It refers to the final authority of power in government. For example, the power of the sovereign in an autocracy.
