= Barisone II of Torres =

12th-century Sardinian nobleman

Barisone II
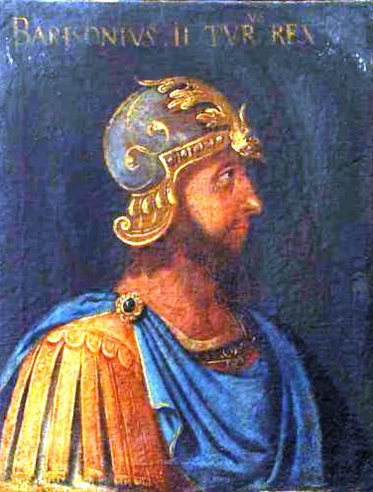

Judge/King of Logudoro/Torres
- Reign: 1154–1190
- Predecessor: Gonario II
- Successor: Constantine II
- Died: 10 June 1191; Messina
- Spouse: Preziosa of Orrubu
- Issue: Constantine II, King of Torres; Susan; Comita II, King of Torres (possibly)
- Barisone Di Lacon-Gunale
- House: Lacon-Gunale
- Father: Gonario II, King of Torres
- Mother: Mary Ebriaco

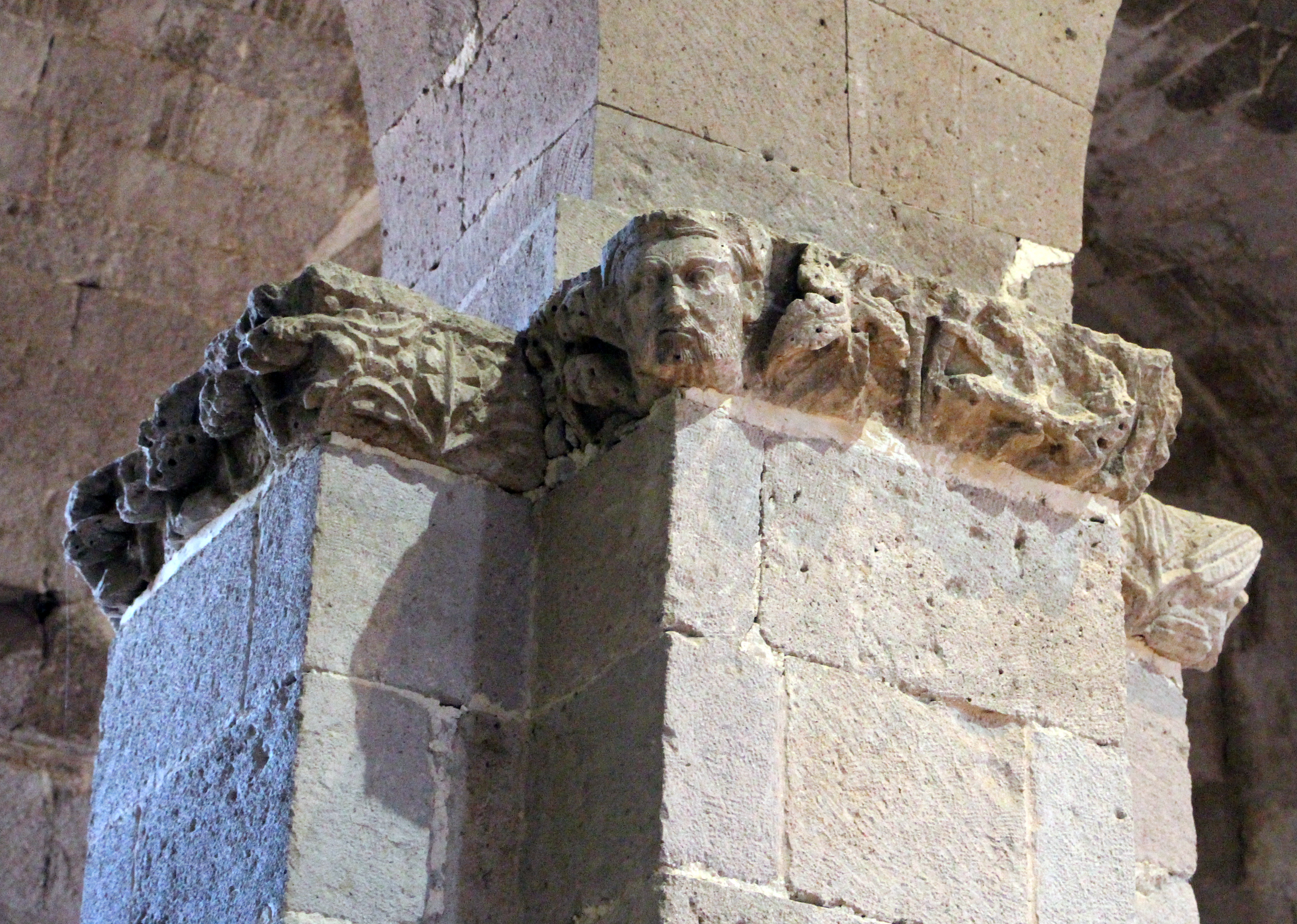
Basilica di Sant'Antioco di Bisarcio, figured capital with a portrait of Judge Barisone II of Torres

Barison II or Barisone II (died 10 June 1191) was the giudice of the Judicate of Logudoro (Note: From the Latin locum de Torres after its capital city of Torres.) from 1153 to 1186. He was the son and successor of Gonario II, who abdicated the throne and retired to the monastery of Clairvaux to live out his days.

Barisone's mother was the Pisan Maria and because of this he had the support of the Pisan citizens of the realm. In October 1163, his brother Peter succeeded Constantine II of Cagliari as his daughter's husband. He was soon opposed by Barisone II of Arborea, who expelled him from Cagliari, and he fled to Torres and the protection of his brother. With Pisan support, the brothers invaded Cagliari in March 1164, reconquering the city, and then Arborea in April, where they holed up Barisone in his castle of Cabras.

Though he was allied to Pisa through his mother and his allies in the war against Arborea, he was constrained to turn to Genoa later that year. In 1166, Barisone and Peter travelled to Pisa to explain the bloody reprisals of the citizens against the Pisans in Ottana. After that he officially abandoned Pisa and signed a treaty with Genoa. In 1168, a treaty negotiated by Nuvolone Alberici between Genoa and Arborea on one side and Pisa, Torres, and Cagliari on the other restored lands lost to Arborea.

In 1183, Pisa reoccupied Cagliari, but in 1186, Barisone returned to his old allies after the death of his brother. He had appointed his son Constantine II as co-ruler in 1170. His daughter Susanna married Andrea Doria (a relative of the famous 16th-century admiral). In 1186, he retired to the monastery of San Giovanni (Note: This church was founded by his grandmother Marcusa.) in Messina, leaving Torres to his son. His younger son Comita III later held the throne of Torres.

== Sources ==
- Ferrabino, Aldo (ed). Dizionario Biografico degli Italiani: VI Baratteri – Bartolozzi. Rome, 1964.
- Scano, D. "Serie cronol. dei giudici sardi." Arch. stor. sardo. 1939.
- Besta, E. and Somi, A. I condaghi di San Nicolas di Trullas e di Santa Maria di Bonarcado. Milan, 1937.

Preceded by Gonario II	Giudice of Logudoro; 1153–1186	Succeeded by Constantine II
