= Andrew Tanca =

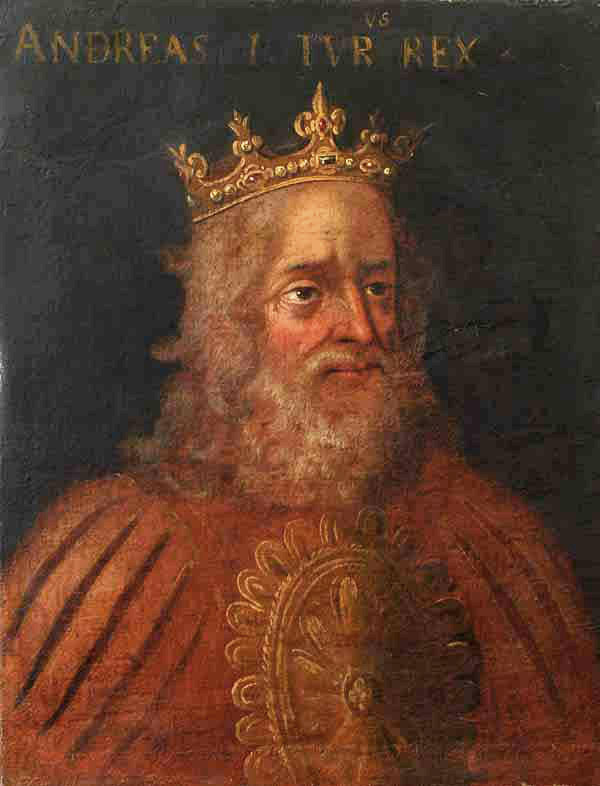

Judge/King of Logudoro/Torres
- Reign: c.1065-1073
- Predecessor: Torchitorio-Barisone I
- Successor: Marianus I
- Co-monarch: Torchitorio-Barisone I (1065-1073)
- Died: 1073
- Issue: Marianus I, King of Torres (possibly)
Names
- Andrew Tanca de Lacon-Gunale
- House: Lacon-Gunale
- Father: Torchitorio-Barisone I, King of Torres

Andrew Tanca was an obscure Judge of Logudoro in the mid-eleventh century. He may have reigned alongside his supposed father Barisone I between about 1064/1065 and 1073 or so. He was probably the father (alternatively, uncle or brother) of his probable successor, Marianus I. Little else is known for certain about him, but he was probably a donor to the Abbey of Montecassino.

== Sources ==
- Manno, Giuseppe (1835). Storia di Sardegna. P.M. Visaj.

Preceded by Barisone I	Judge of Logudoro ca. 1064 – ca. 1073	Succeeded by Marianus I
