= Robin Guenther =

American architect

- Born: October 2, 1954
- Died: May 6, 2023 (aged 68)
- Education: University of Michigan
- Occupation: architect
- Employer(s): Guenther 5 Architects; Perkins & Will
- Known for: Sustainable healthcare facilities
- Spouse: Perry Guenther

Robin Guenther (October 2, 1954 - May 6, 2023) was an American architect. She was a leader in regenerative healthcare design and designed sustainable health care facilities. Guenther founded Guenther 5 Architects in 2001, which was acquired by Perkins & Will in 2007. Guenther was a principal at Perkins & Will. She also co-wrote a book with Gail Vittori titled, Sustainable Healthcare Architecture.

== Early life and education ==
Guenther was born in Detroit, Michigan on October 2, 1954. She studied architecture at the University of Michigan and the Architectural Association in London.

== Personal life ==
Robin Guenther was married to Perry Gunther for 38 years. Guenther died on May 6, 2023 at age 68 from ovarian cancer.
