= Orzocorre II of Arborea =

Orzocorre II (also spelled Onroco or Orsocorre) (died 1122) was the Judge of Arborea in Sardinia in the early twelfth century. He was the son and successor of Torbeno and Anna de Lacon.

In a parchment preserved with his subscription to it, his grandmother Nivata was granted the right to dispose of the two houses of Nurage Nigellu and Massone de Capras which she had built as she wished. She granted them to the Emperor with the condition that they not be sold. This strongly suggests the recognition of imperial suzerainty in the province of Arborea at the time.

Orzocorre's wife was Maria Orvu and his son and successor was Comita I.

== Sources ==
- Manno, Giuseppe (1835). Storia di Sardegna. P.M. Visaj.
- Fara, G. F. De Rebus Sardois.

Preceded by Torbeno	Judge of Arborea c. 1100 – 1122	Succeeded by Comita I
