= Constantine I of Cagliari =

Constantine I Salusio II

Judge/King of Cagliari
- Reign: 1089-1090 (1st time); 1090-1103 (2nd time)
- Predecessor: Orzocco Torchitorio I (1st time); Torbeno (2nd time)
- Successor: Torbeno (1st time); Marianus II Torchitorio II (2nd time)
- Died: 1103
- Spouse: Giorgia of Lacon
- Issue: See list: Marianus II Torchitorio II, Judge of Cagliari; Orzocco; Ittocorre; Sergius; Elena; Vera
- House: Lacon-Gunale
- Father: Orzocco Torchitorio I
- Mother: Vera of Lacon

Constantine I was the giudice of Cagliari. He was the son of the giudice Orzocco Torchitorio and giudicessa Vera. In the eleventh century, the throne of Cagliari traditionally passed between the houses of Torchitorio de Ugunale and Salusio de Lacon. Constantine took the name Salusio II (de Lacon) upon his succession, in an attempt to unite the families. He appears in contemporary charters as rex et iudex Caralitanus: "King and Judge of Cagliari."

On 30 June 1089, Constantine confirmed that the monastery of Saint-Victor in Marseille possessed the Sardinian monasteries of San Giorgio di Decimo and San Genesio di Uta. Such confirmations of monastic privileges were commonly associated with accessions at the time and this seems to indicate that Constantine was new to the throne in 1089, fixing the date of his succession to in or shortly before that year.

The bishops and giudici of Cagliari had attained a high level of autonomy and isolation in the past century before Constantine's accession and this prompted papal action, a side-action of the Gregorian reform. Constantine began to take Cagliari out of its isolation, banking on Benedictine monasticism to reform his country economically, technologically, and ecclesiastically. In accord with the pope's wishes, he put Cagliari under the authority of Lambert, Archbishop of Pisa. Constantine ardently supported the Church and vowed to uphold its rights and abandon the ways of his forefathers: concubinage, incest, and murder.

Constantine married Giorgia, probably of the Lacon family. He had a daughter named Elena who died before 1089 and another named Vera who was alive in 1124. He had four sons, including Marianus II, and Orzocco (died after 1163), Itocorre (died 1112), and Sergius (died circa 1141). Constantine last appears in 1090, but a successor does not appear until 1103. His successor was his brother Torbeno, who may have been associated with him before.

== Sources ==
- Ghisalberti, Aldo (ed). Dizionario Biografico degli Italiani: XXX Cosattini – Crispolto. Rome, 1984.
- Prima Carta Cagliaritana.

Preceded by Arzone	Giudice of Cagliari c. 1089 – c. 1102	Succeeded by Torbeno
