= Vittorini =

Vittorini is a surname. Notable people with the surname include:

- Domenico Vittorini (1892–1958), Italian writer and academic
- Elio Vittorini (1908–1966), Italian writer and novelist
- Fabio Vittorini (born 1971), Italian academic and literary critic
