= Constantine I of Torres =

Constantine I

Judge/King of Logudoro/Torres
- Reign: c. 1082–1128
- Predecessor: Marianus I
- Successor: Gonario II
- Born: 1064
- Died: 1128 (aged 63–64)
- Spouse: Marcusa of Arborea; Mary de Orrubu (possibly the same as the above)
- Issue: Gonario II, King of Torres
Names
- Constantine I de Lacon-Gunale
- House: Lacon-Gunale
- Father: Marianus I, King of Torres
- Mother: Susan of Thori

Constantine I (c. 1064 – 1128) was the giudice of Logudoro. He was co-ruling by 1082 and sole ruler by 1113. His reign is usually said to have begun about 1112.

He was the son of Marianus I, with whom he co-reigned, and Susanna de Thori.

== 1113/1115 ==
Sometime between 1113, the first year in which Constantine is recorded as sole ruler, and 1115, a Tuscan and Lombard fleet, led by the Republic of Pisa, sailed into the harbour of Porto Torres following the successful liberation of the Balearic Islands from Saracen domination. Indeed, one of the leaders of this brigade was Saltaro, Constantine's son. According to the Liber maiolichinus, Constantine was recognised as re chiaro e molto celebrato ("clear, most-celebrated king") over the entire island of Sardinia after this.

== Improved knowledge ==
Constantine continued the monastic reforms and expansions of his predecessors' reigns. He firstly supported the Cassinese establishments, but his favour soon shifted to the Camaldolese and Vallumbrosan houses. By 1125, Camaldolese foundations were the most numerous on the island and Vallumbrosan ones could be found in every province of Logudoro. The reasons for such strong support of monasticism, the papacy (including the Gregorian reforms), and the suzerainty of the archdiocese of Pisa were probably the advancements brought by closer ties to the mainland and the technological, economic, agricultural, educational, and religious knowledge that the monks brought.

== Expanding religious interest ==
During Constantine's reign, the noblemen, especially those of the Athen and Thori families, first began to expand their religious interests and participate in the ecclesiastic expansions and structural reforms that characterised the twelfth century in Sardinia founded a series of churches.

=== Churches founded during Constantine's reign ===
- S. Maria del Regno (Ardara)
- S. Pietro (Bosa)
- S. Michele (Plaiano, Sassari)
- S. Michele de Salvenor (Ploaghe)
- S. Maria Coghinas (Coghinas)
- S. Nicolas di Trullas (Semestene)

Constantine himself, in fulfillment of a vow, founded the Basilica di Saccargia in Codrongianus, Sassari, where he was later buried.

== Family ==
It appears that, in 1116, Constantine married Marcusa de Gunale of the Giudicato of Arborea. Other later documents cite a wife named Maria de Orrubu, but whether or not these were two different women or the same woman is unknown, though the former hypothesis seems most probable. According to the Libellus iudicum Turritanorum, Marcusa was a widow with two sons at the time of her marriage to Constantine. Together with him she had a son named Gonario. After her husband's death, she went to Sicily, where she founded a hospital named after S. Giovanni at Messina and took up service for God there until her death.

== Sources ==
- Ghisalberti, Aldo (ed). Dizionario Biografico degli Italiani: XXX Cosattini – Crispolto. Rome, 1984.

| Preceded by Marianus I | Giudice of Torres ca. 1112 – 1128 | Succeeded by Gonario II |
