= Marianus I of Torres =

Marianus I
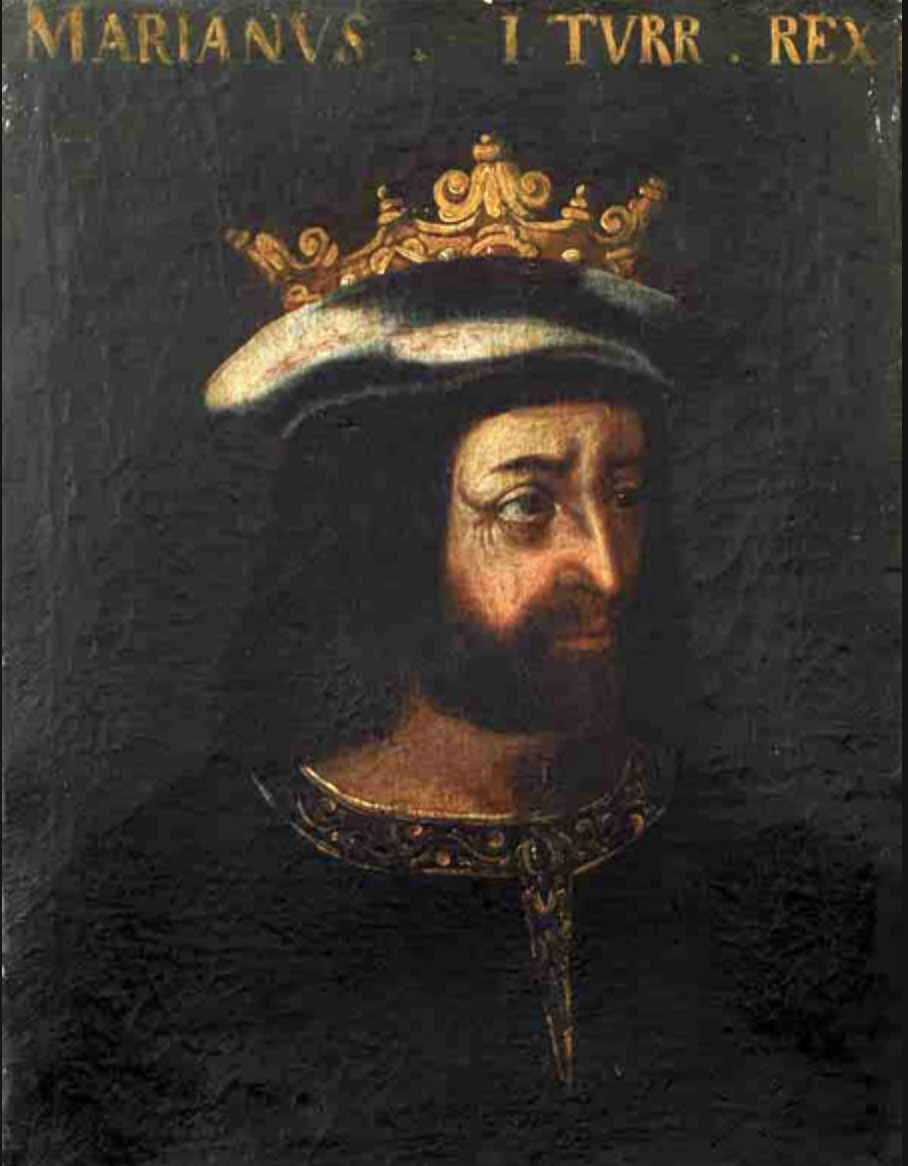

Judge/King of Logudoro/Torres
- Reign: 1073-c.1082
- Predecessor: Andrew Tanca
- Successor: Constantine I
- Died: After 1082
- Spouse: Susan of Thori
- Issue: Constantine I, King of Torres
Names
- Marianus de Lacon-Gunale
- House: Lacon-Gunale
- Father: Andrew Tanca, King of Torres (possibly)

Marianus I (died after 18 March 1082) was the Judge of Logudoro from 1073, when he is first mentioned after his father or grandfather, Barisone I, until about 1082, when he is last mentioned.

== Biography ==
His reign is obscure and the next judge mentioned is his son Constantine I in 1112, but to ascribe to Marianus a 39-year reign seems unnecessary and the presence of unknown other judges between Marianus and Constantine is likely.

In 1147, Marianus' grandson, Gonario II, made a donation of silver to the Abbey of Montecassino, citing his father and his grandfather as prior donors. Perhaps this Marianus was a different one from the one who received a letter from Pope Gregory VII in 1073. Similarly, the Cronaca sarda makes Marianus the son of Andrew Tanca. The exact identity and relationships of this judge remain a matter of dispute.

Not only did Marianus make a donation to Montecassino, but he benefited the local churches as well and paid an annual sum to the papacy. He was an ally of the Republic of Pisa.

== Sources ==
- Manno, Giuseppe (1835). Storia di Sardegna. P.M. Visaj.

Preceded by Barisone I	Judge of Logudoro before 1073 – before 1112	Succeeded by Constantine I
