= Marianus I of Arborea =

Mariano I
- Judge of Arborea
- Reign: 1060 – 1070
- Died: 1070
- Issue: Orzocorre I of Arborea
Names
- Mariano I de Lacon-Zori
- Dynasty: Lacon-Zori
- Father: Barisone I of Torres

Marianus I, known as Mariano de Zori, was an early Judge of Arborea. The exact date of his reign is unknown. Francisco de Vico, followed by José Pellicer, placed it in 1000–20 without any documentary evidence. Giovanni Francesco Fara, after analysing the documents, placed the reign of one unnamed judge earlier than that of Marianus, and dated his to around 1050. A record of none of his acts has survived, and he is only important for standing at the head of Arborea's first dynasty, which took the name Lacon (or Laccon).
