= Barisone I of Torres =

11th-century Sardinian nobleman

Torchitorio Barisone [I]
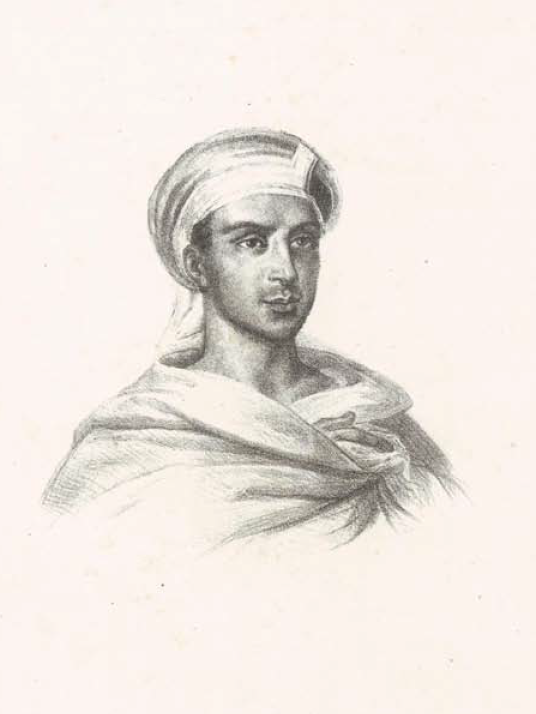

Judge/King of Logudoro/Torres
- Reign: 1028–1073
- Predecessor: Gonario-Comita I
- Successor: Andrea Tanca

Judge/King of Arborea
- Reign: 1038–1060
- Predecessor: Gonario-Comita I
- Successor: Mariano I
- Died: 1073
- Issue: Mariano I, King of Arborea
- Torchitorio Barisone de Lacon-Gunale
- House: Lacon-Gunale
- Father: Gonario-Comita I, King of Torres

Barison I or Barisone I was the giudicato or "judge" of Arborea from around 1038 until about 1060 and then of Logudoro (Note: From the Latin locum de Torres after its capital city of Torres.) until his death sometime around 1073. He is the earliest ruler of Logudoro of whom anything is known with certainty. Barisone's policies included opposition to the Republic of Pisa and support of monastic immigration from mainland Italy. His wife was Preziosa de Orrubu. (Note: Also spelled "Orruvu".)

On hearing of the death of the judge of Logudoro around 1060, Barisone gave Arborea to his nephew (or son) Marianus and went to Porto Torres to receive the vacant judgeship. In 1063, Barisone gave a gift of a large territory and two churches, (Note: in the territory of Siligo, not far from Ardara where Barisone had his palace) including the Byzantine church of Nostra Segnora de Mesumundu and that of Sant'Elia di Montesanto, to the abbey of Montecassino and asked the abbot Desiderius of Benevento to send twelve monks to establish the Benedictine rule on the island of Sardinia. Desiderius sent them, via Gaeta, with books, relics, and other religious and cultural items. However, determined to maintain a religious monopoly in Sardinia, the Pisan archdiocese attacked the monks at sea off the Giglio Island, where four died. The remaining eight returned to Montecassino. While Pope Alexander II excommunicated the Pisans for the assault, only the intervention of Godfrey the Bearded, margrave of Tuscany, secured satisfaction to the monastery and to Barisone. Finally, in 1065, the monks sent by Desiderius arrived on the island and took possession of the territory and the churches and founded a small monastery, adjacent to the church of Nostra Segnora de Mesumundu.

In that same year, Barisone associated his nephew (or son) Andrew Tanca with him in the government and this Marianus succeeded him on his death.

== Sources ==
- Ferrabino, Aldo (ed). Dizionario Biografico degli Italiani: VI Baratteri – Bartolozzi. Rome, 1964.
- Scano, D. "Serie cronol. dei giudici sardi." Arch. stor. sardo. 1939.
- Besta, E. and Somi, A. I condaghi di San Nicolas di Trullas e di Santa Maria di Bonarcado. Milan, 1937.

Preceded by Gonario	Giudice of Arborea; 1038–1060	Succeeded by Marianus I
Preceded by Gonario	Giudice of Logudoro; 1060–1073	Succeeded by Andrew
