= Judicate of Logudoro =

Medieval kingdom in Sardinia

Judicate of Torres Iudicatus Turritanus Torres (Latin)
- 11th century–1259
- Coat of arms

- Judicate of Torres
- Capital: Ardara, Porto Torres, Sassari
- Common languages: Sardinian, Latin
- Government: Judicate (kingdom)
- Judge
  - 1060–1073: Barisone I of Torres
  - 1218–1233: Marianus II of Torres
  - 1236–1259: Adelasia of Torres
- History
  - Established: 11th century
  - Disestablished: 1259
Preceded by
Byzantine Empire
Succeeded by
Republic of Sassari
Republic of Genoa
Judicate of Arborea
Malaspina family

The Judicate of Logudoro or Torres (Sardinian: Judicadu de Logudoro or Torres, Rennu de Logudoro or Logu de Torres) was one of the four kingdoms or iudicati into which Sardinia was divided during the Middle Ages. It occupied the northwest part of the island from the 11th through the 13th century, bordering the Gallura to the east, Arborea to the south, and Cagliari to the southeast. Its original capital was Porto Torres. The region is still called Logudoro today.

Logudoro was the largest and earliest of the iudicati but also the second to be subsumed by a foreign power. It was divided into twenty curatoriae, ruled by curatores.

== History ==
Sardinia was an imperial province of the Byzantine Empire until the 9th century, when the Arabs and Berbers began pursuing aggressive policies of expansion and piracy in the Mediterranean. The gradual conquest of Sicily by these groups from 827 on effectively cut Sardinia off from the central government and military might of the Empire, and the Byzantines found the island increasingly difficult to supply and defend. In the absence of instruction or reinforcement, the Sardinian provincial Byzantine officials, called iudices ("judges") began to govern autonomously. A single archontate was formed to govern the entire island, that nominally still recognized the Byzantine emperor. By the 11th century the archontate became divided into four provinces (giudicati, literally "judgeships"), though two — Logudoro and Arborea — were combined at the start of the 11th century. By 1073, these districts had become de facto independent states, their ruling kings still titled as iudices or judikes after their imperial civil servant predecessors. The first capital city of the Giudicato of Logudoro was ancient Torres (now Porto Torres), but the coastal city was exposed to Arab attacks, and so the seat of the judgeship was transferred first to Ardara and finally to Sassari.

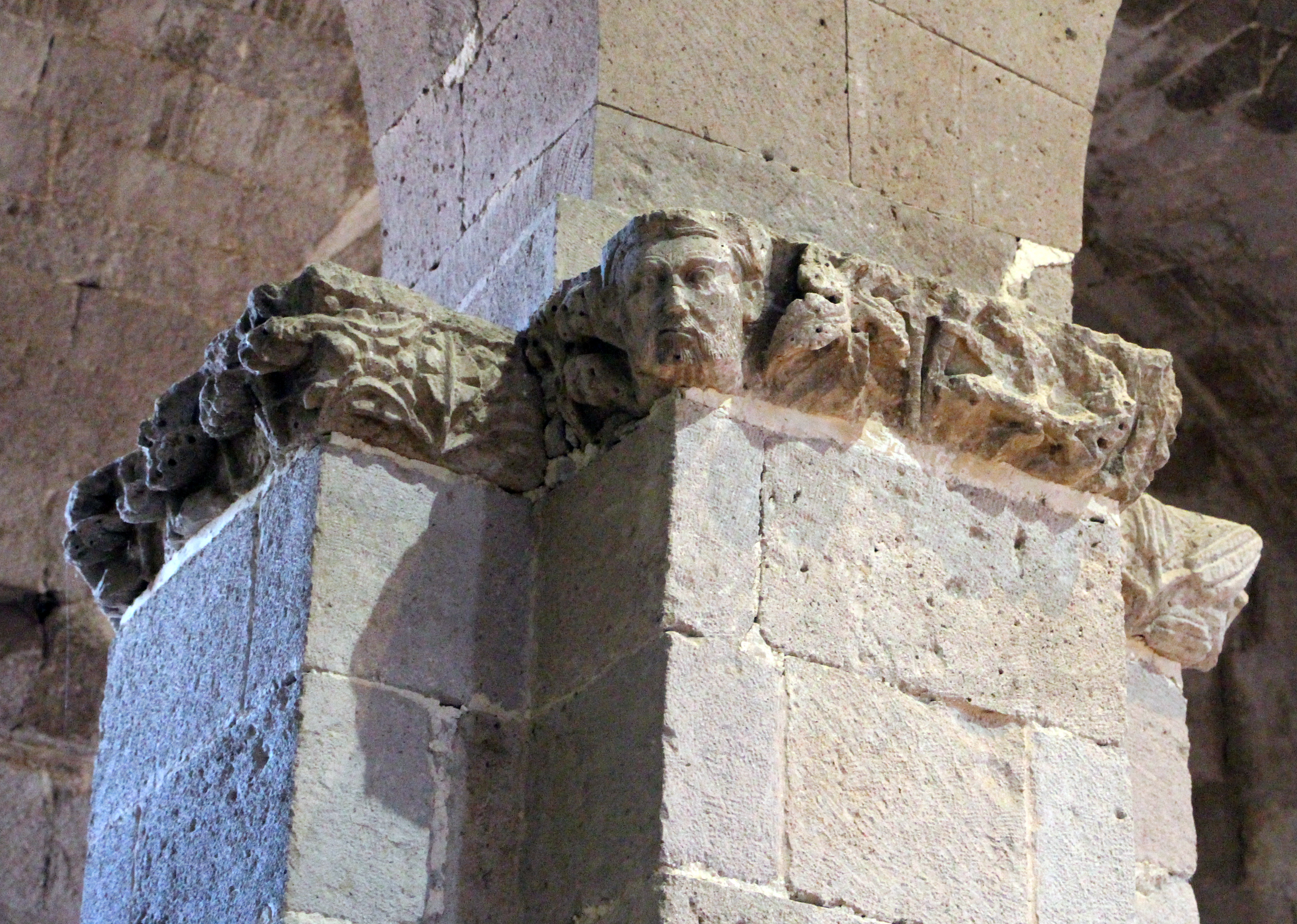
Basilica di Sant'Antioco di Bisarcio, figured capital with a portrait of Judge Barisone II of Torres

Logudoro only began to emerge from the fog of history during the reign of Barisone I from about 1038 to 1073. He brought Western monasticism to the island by requesting monks from Abbot Desiderius of Montecassino and in this he was supported by both Pope Alexander II and Godfrey the Bearded, Margrave of Tuscany, though the archdiocese of Pisa, thitherto the chief religious influence on the island, opposed it. The monks had spiritual, scholastic and military roles. On the death of Barisone I, Arborea chose its own judge in Marianus de Zori, while the Logudorese chose Andrew Tanca.

The kingdom of Logudoro came to an end in 1259, when the queen Adelasia died without an heir. After this, Logudoro was effectively ruled by the Genoese families of Doria and Malaspina, and the ruling family of Arborea. Sassari meanwhile became an autonomous city-state.

== See also ==
- King of Torres
