= Sardinian–Catalan war =

Military conflict between the Crown of Aragon and Arborea (1353–1420)

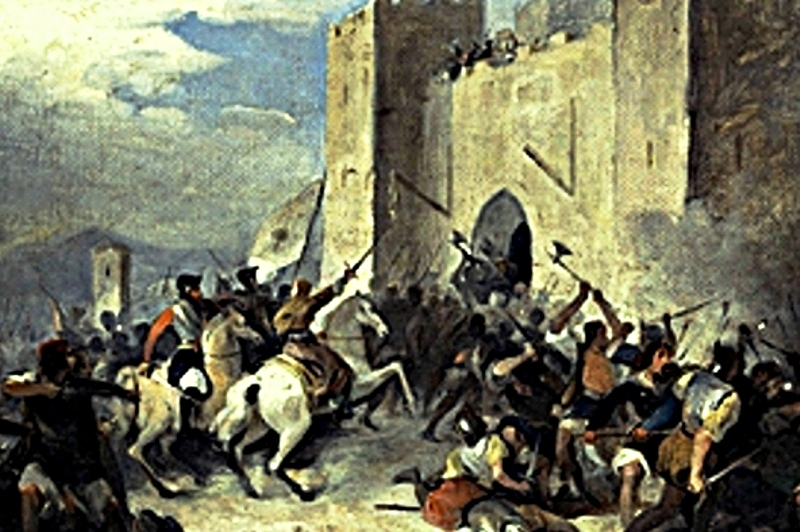
- The battle of Sanluri by Giovanni Marghinotti
Date	1353–1420
Location	Sardinia
Result	Aragonese victory
Territorial changes	Arborea became part of Sardinia, thus making it part of the Crown of Aragon.

Belligerents
Crown of Aragon	Judicate of Arborea; House of Doria; Republic of Genoa

The Sardinian–Catalan war or Sardinian–Aragonese war was a late medieval conflict lasting from 1353 to 1420. The fight was over supremacy of the land and took place between the Judicate of Arborea, allied with the Sardinian branch of the Doria family and Genoa, and the Kingdom of Sardinia, the latter of which had been part of the Crown of Aragon since 1324. The conflict also included a systematic policy of persecution, mass murder and forced denationalization and assimilation, examples of which being the destruction of the villages of Aryagono and Rebeccu and the Alghero Massacre, perpetrated against the Sardinian population at the hands of King James I of Aragon.

== Background ==
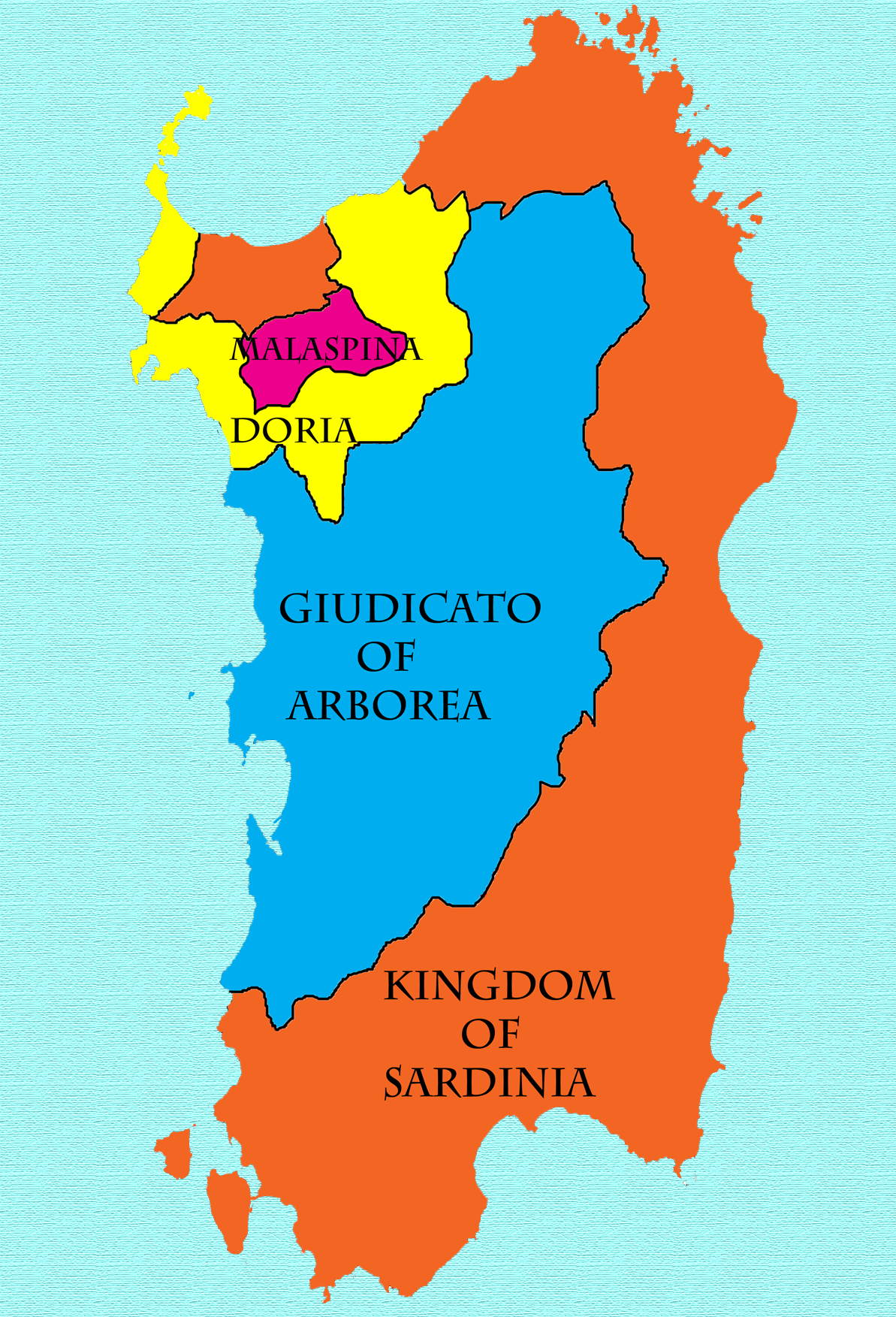
Political situation in Sardinia just before the war

In 1297, in an attempt to settle the dispute between the Angevins and Aragonese over the Kingdom of Sicily (which had triggered the popular movement known as the Sicilian Vespers), Pope Boniface VIII formed the Kingdom of Sardinia and Corsica (Latin: Regnum Sardiniae et Corsicae) for James II the Just, King of Aragon.

In June 1323 the Aragonese Crown's territorial conquest of Sardinia began. A powerful army sailed from the port of Tortosa, Principality of Catalonia, to the island. At this time, the land was under the influence of the Republic of Pisa, Genoa and the Doria and Malaspina families, as well as the Judicate of Arborea, the only surviving judicial state entity.

The Arborean judge Hugh II of Arborea became a vassal of James II of Aragon in exchange for the maintenance of the dynastic rights over his Judicate, with the hope to expand his control over the whole of Sardinia, as lieutenant of the king, residing in Barcelona. Hugh opened hostilities against Pisa and actively participated in the subsequent Aragonese military actions against the Pisans who, repeatedly defeated by land and sea (despite the help of the Doria and Genoa), were forced to yield their Sardinian possessions (former Judicate of Cagliari and Judicate of Gallura) to the Iberians. These lands, along with the commune of Sassari, became the first territorial nucleus of the Kingdom of Sardinia.

In 1343, at the death without sons of Giovanni Malaspina di Villafranca, all the Malaspinan Sardinian possessions passed by testament to Peter IV of Aragon, who incorporated them into the Kingdom of Sardinia. The Aragonese then clashed with the Sardinian branch of the Doria, owners of large portions of the former Judicate of Torres, who tried to occupy Sassari and, in 1347, exceptionally reunited, inflicted a heavy defeat to the Aragonese at the battle of Aidu de Turdu, a locality between Bonorva and Giave. However, in the summer of 1353 a Venetian–Aragonese fleet defeated the Genoese fleet off Alghero. A few days later the Aragonese troops, led by Bernat de Cabrera, triumphantly entered the Dorian city.

== The long conflict ==
=== 1353–1354 ===
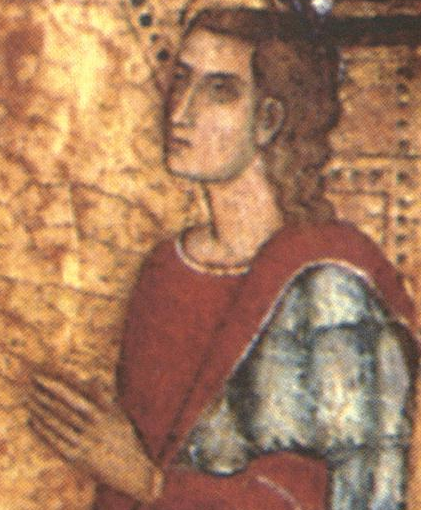
Marianus IV of Arborea, Church of San Nicola (Ottana)

In September 1353, feeling threatened by the Aragonese claims of sovereignty and by the consolidation of their power in the rest of the island, Marianus IV, judge of Arborea broke the alliance with the Aragonese made by his father. Allied with the Doria he declared war on the Kingdom of Sardinia. The judicial troops penetrated the Campidano of Cagliari without encountering real resistance from the Aragonese. Many villages rebelled against the Iberian feudal lords and joined the Arborean cause. Marianus's army then occupied the villa of Quartu Sant'Elena and threatened the nearby city of Cagliari, the capital of the Sardinian kingdom.

On September 18, the Cagliarin councilors of the Aragonese governor, broached the Admiral Bernat de Cabrera for help. Procurement was difficult because Marianus had cut all supplies to Cagliari and Villa di Chiesa. On October 6 Cabrera, who arrived in the south of the island, defeated the armies of the judge near Quartu and loosened the Arborean siege over the city.

Meanwhile, in the north of Sardinia, numerous rebellions raged at the instigation of the Doria. On October 13 the fortress of Monteleone Rocca Doria rose and Alghero was reoccupied on October 15. At the end of the month Marianus and Matteo Doria besieged Sassari with about 400 knights and 1000 infantrymen. At the turn of 1353 the Arborea and the Doria were masters of almost all of Sardinia; only the cities of Cagliari, Sassari, and Villa di Chiesa and some castles remained in the hands of the Kingdom of Sardinia.

Marianus possessed considerable military capabilities and, thanks to the sizable export of grains, his Judicate had the economic resources necessary to support an army able to oppose that of the crown of Aragon. He had infantrymen and knights recruited from the villages, a body of crossbowmen and soldiers of fortune of various origins (Italy, Germany, France, England) commanded by expert captains coming from the Italian Peninsula.

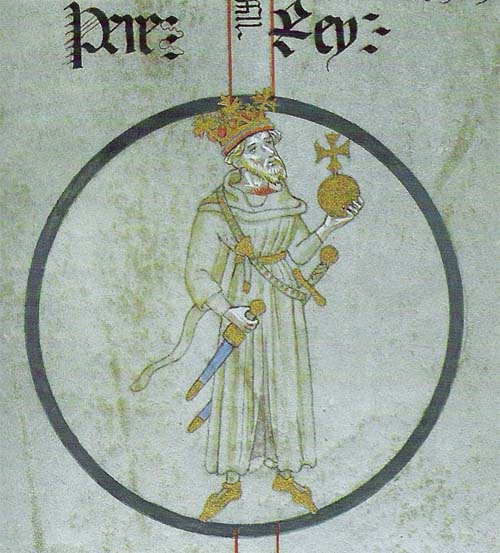
Peter IV the Ceremonious (Poblet Monastery)

Given the aggravation of the situation, King Peter IV of Aragon set up an impressive expedition to quell the rebellion on the island. He commanded a large fleet that landed on June 22, 1354, in Porto Conte with the aim of reconquering the city of Alghero.

The Aragonese siege, which lasted about five months, ended in a disaster from all points of view, due to the malaria that caused many victims among the ranks of the besiegers. Marianus, who came near the allied city under siege, came with his troops near Bosa, but did not fight. In order to avoid a complete defeat, Peter began negotiations with Marianus.

On November 13, 1354, the Peace of Alghero was signed, with which Marianus obtained several of his objectives for the revolt: the autonomy of his Judicate, freedom of trade in the Arborean ports, the fief of Gallura and the clause that the governor general of the kingdom of Sardinia must be a person pleasing to him. Peter IV could in return take possession of Alghero; the original Sardinian–Ligurian population, being pro-Genoese, was evacuated and replaced by Catalan colonists.

=== 1365–1388 ===
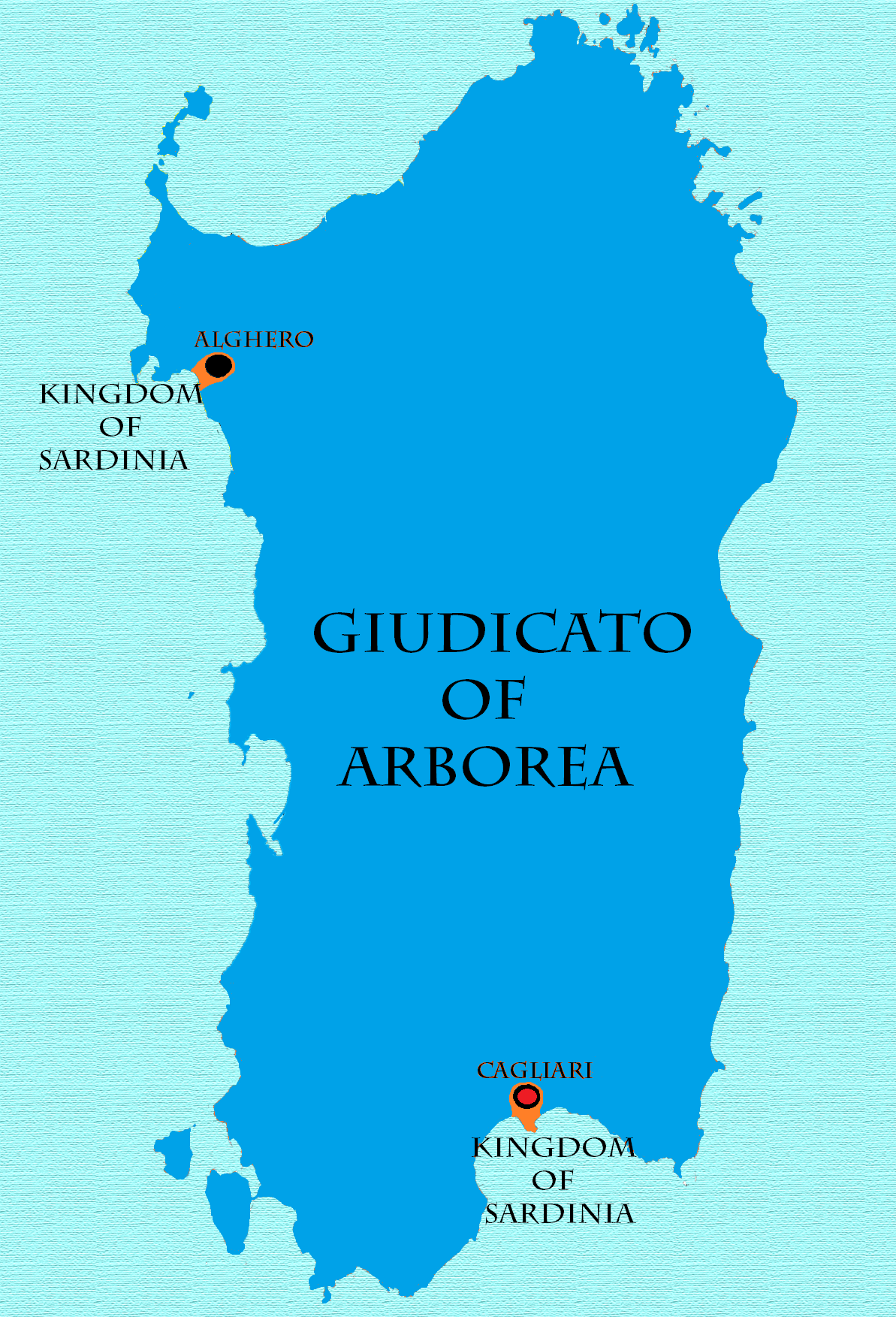
Judicate of Arborea in 1368–1388 and 1392–1409

The peace did not last long and, in 1365, Marianus invaded the Aragonese territories, again entering the Campidano and Cixerri. He conquered various villages and castles and the mining town of Villa di Chiesa, which rebelled against the Aragonese. In the spring of 1366, he built a fortified camp near Selargius to block supplies to Cagliari, but the city did not give up. With the support of Genoa, Marianus also opened a new front in the north of the island.

In June 1368 an Aragonese army led by Pedro Martínez de Luna arrived in Cagliari and marched toward the Judicial capital, Oristano, which until then had never been besieged by Aragonese troops. Hugh, the son of Marianus, came to the rescue of the city with an army recruited in the occupied territories. While the Catalans were preparing for the battle, Marianus left the besieged city, attacking them by surprise and defeating them near Sant'Anna.

In 1369, after a brief siege, Sassari was conquered, followed by Osilo. By 1370 the Aragonese presence in Sardinia had been reduced only to the cities of Cagliari and Alghero and to the castles of San Michele, Gioiosa Guardia, Aquafredda and Quirra. In 1374 the fleet of the Republic of Genoa, in support of Marianus, attacked the port of Cagliari but was rejected by the resistance of the royal troops.

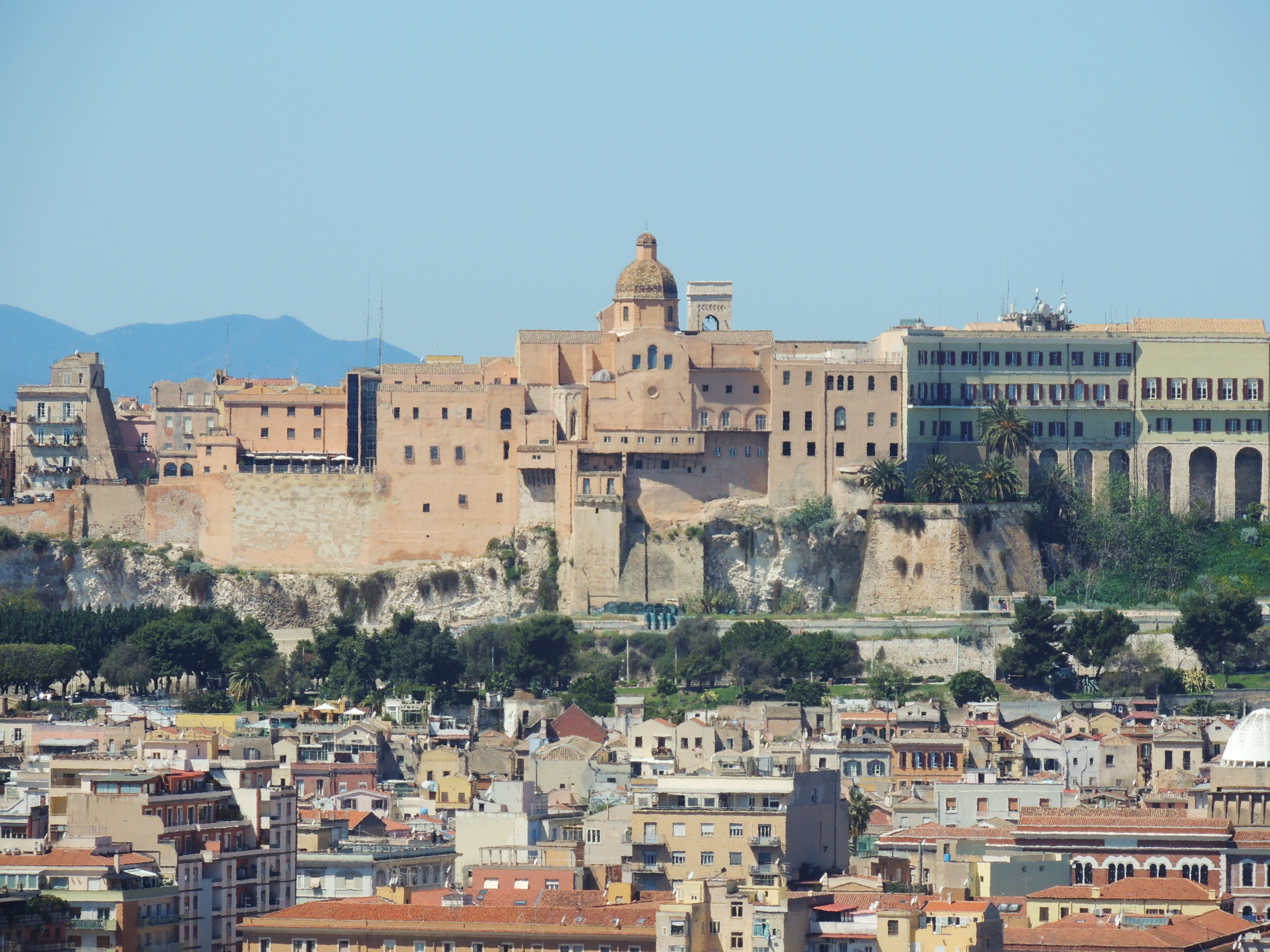
Eastern walls of Cagliari

Marianus IV died in May 1375 at the height of his power, perhaps hit by the plague. His firstborn, Hugh, took over with the dynastic name of Hugh III of Arborea. Hugh continued his father's policy of territorial expansion. However, his military feats were not at same level to those of the father, and the cities of Cagliari and Alghero remained unconquered. His reign was of short duration and, like his ancestor John of Arborea, Hugh III, together with his only daughter, Benedetta, was assassinated in 1383 during a riot. Frederick of Arborea succeeded Hugh, followed in 1387 by Marianus V; both were sons of Eleonora d'Arborea and Brancaleone Doria. However, being minors the throne was inherited de facto by their mother who in 1388 stipulated a peace treaty with Aragon, committing herself to restitution of the territories conquered by her predecessors.

=== 1390–1420 ===
After a few years the hostilities between the two parties resumed when, freed from the Aragonese, Brancaleone Doria violated the peace treaty signed by his wife and by John I of Aragon, considering it not valid. On April 1, 1391, he marched against Castel di Cagliari; on August 16, with his son Marianus V of Arborea alongside, he occupied Sassari and Osilo. In September he conquered the castles of Fava, Pontes, Bonvehì and Pedres, leaving only Alghero and Longosardo to their adversaries. He then entered Villa di Chiesa and Sanluri. In a letter written to Sanluri on February 3, 1392, Brancaleone announced that he had retaken all the territories owned in 1388.

The military operations ended, however, with the Aragonese continuing to control the surrounding sea. In the summer of 1406 Brancaleone resumed the offensive, invading many lands of the former Judicate of Cagliari and Ogliastra, occupying the castle of Quirra, attacking Longosardo and besieging Cagliari.

Eleonora died early in 1404 and Marianus V in 1407, and Brancaleone fell into disgrace before dying in 1409. The Arborea throne was offered by the Corona de Logu to William III of Narbonne (the nephew of Beatrice, who was the sister of Hugh III and Eleonora) who became a judge with the name of William II. Taking advantage of the dynastic crisis, the heir to the crown of Aragon, Martin I of Sicily the Younger, on October 6, 1408, landed in Sardinia with a powerful army commanded by Pedro Torrelles.

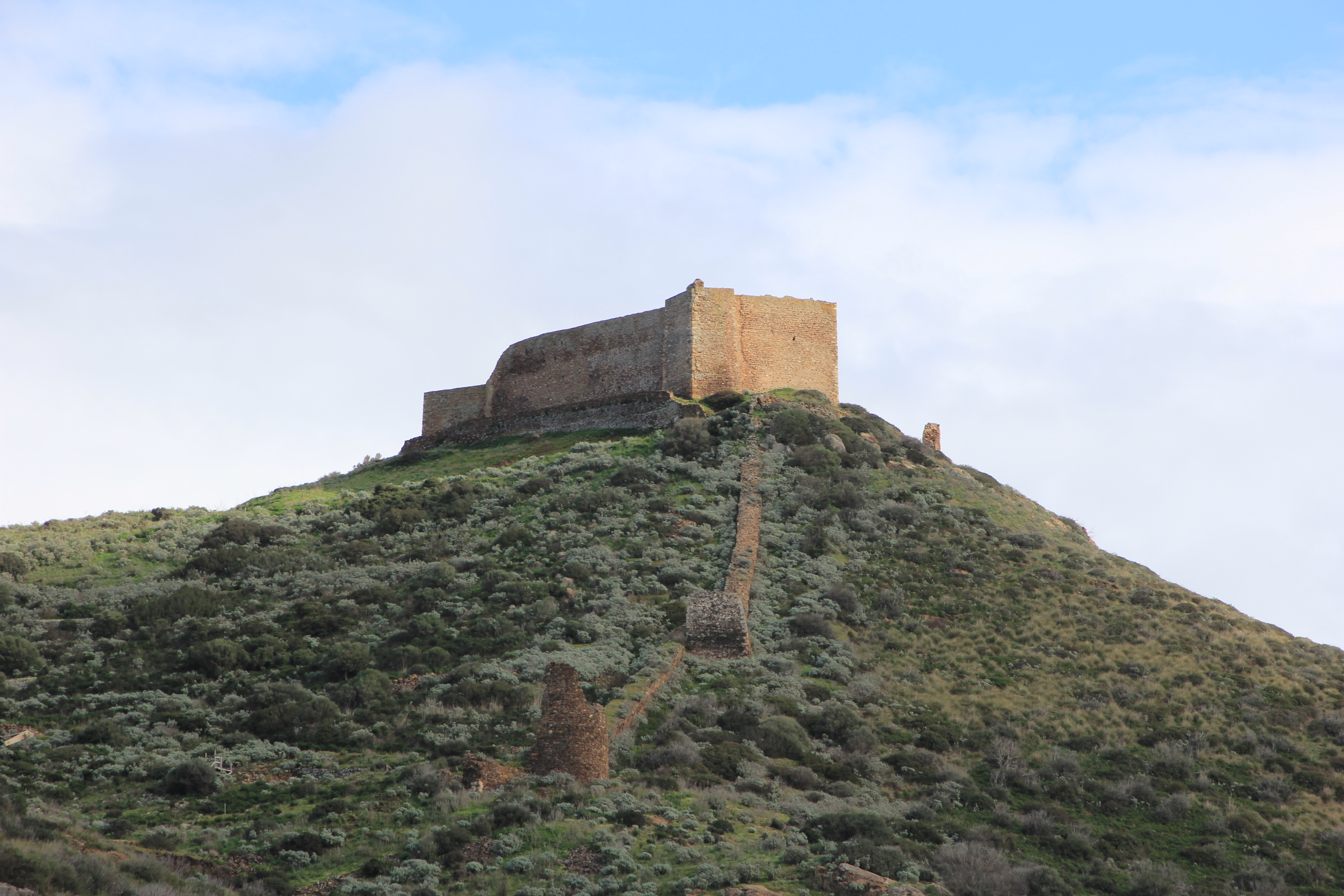
Castle of Monreale, Sardara

After failed attempts to reach an agreement, the war resumed its course. The clash between the two camps took place in the countryside of Sanluri, in the locality currently called su bruncu de sa battalla (battle hill), on June 30, 1409. The troops of the Kingdom of Sardinia divided the judicial army, led by William, into two sections. The left side was overwhelmed in the locality called s'occidroxiu (the slaughterhouse); the right split into two remainders: the first retreated to Sanluri, but was reached and destroyed, the second took refuge in Monreale and resisted. On July 4, Villa di Chiesa surrendered in the hands of Giovanni de Sena.

It was a disaster for the Arborea, even if Martin the Young died shortly afterward in Cagliari on July 25, 1409, of malaria, probably contracted after the battle. William III of Narbonne (William II as judge of Arborea) returned to France to seek help and left, as a de facto judge, his cousin, Leonardo Cubello, descended from Hugh II.

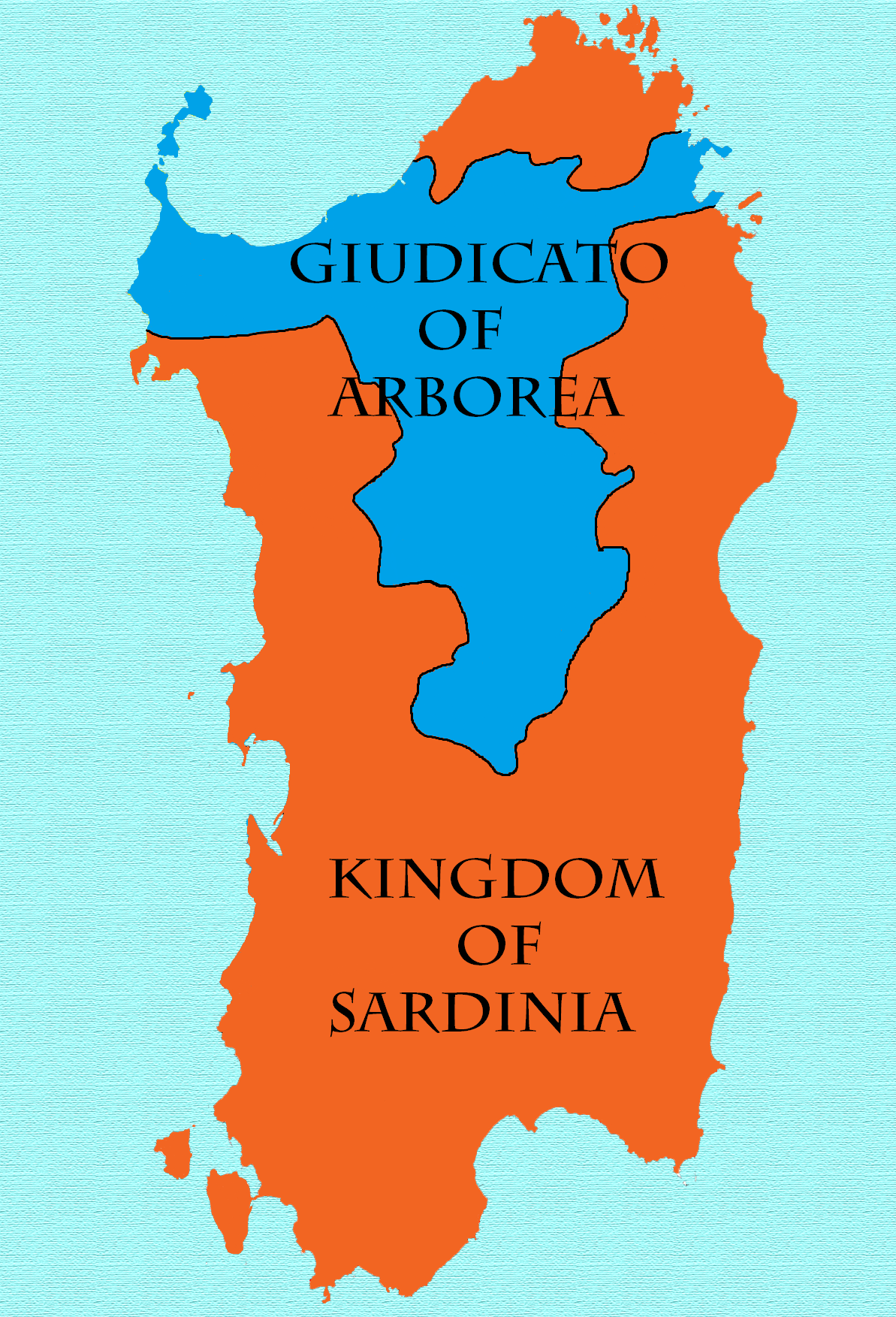
Judicate of Arborea between 1410 and 1420

The heavy defeat suffered at Sanluri, however, did not completely bend the Arboreans. The fighting resumed and, on August 17, the judicial army rejected a violent attack against Oristano by the Moncada. The following day Pedro Torrelles led the soldiers of the Kingdom of Sardinia in a battle on the plain between Sant'Anna, Fenosu and Santa Giusta, remembered as the Second Battle (Segunda battalla), leaving on the field – according to Spanish sources – more than 6,500 of their men. The conflict was not yet concluded; the army of the Kingdom of Sardinia asked and obtained reinforcements. The Arboreans defended themselves strenuously and seven months passed before Pedro Torrelles conquered the castles of Monreale, Marmilla and Gioiosa Guardia. In January 1410 Pedro Torrelles occupied Bosa and besieged Oristano, where finally Leonardo Cubello signed, in the church of San Martino outside the walls, the surrender of the city and all of the areas of Arborea that were forfeited in the Regnum Sardiniae et Corsicae. Oristano and the Campidano of Cabras, Milis and Simaxis were given to him along with the title of Marquis of Oristano. Remaining Arborean territories included the former Judicate of Torres, two curatoria of the Judicate of Gallura and the Barbagia of Belvì, Ollolai and Mandrolisai.

In spring of the same year William II of Narbonne returned from France, organizing the surviving territories and transferring the capital of the Judicate to Sassari. With the help of Nicolò Doria he resumed the castle of Longosardo and threatened Oristano and Alghero, where Pedro Torrelles, the captain general and lieutenant of the king, died in that year of malaria. The war continued and between May 5 and 6, 1412, managed to enter Alghero with Sassarese and French militiamen, but was then rejected and forced to desist by the fierce resistance of the Algherese.

Convinced that he could not improve the situation, William dealt first with King Ferdinand I of Aragon, then with his son Alfonso V the Magnanimous. An agreement was reached on August 17, 1420, and what remained of the old Judicate of Arborea was sold for 100,000 gold florins.

== Consequences ==
The decades in which the conflict took place were among the darkest in Sardinian history. Among the most obvious consequences, in addition to the extinction of the Judicate of Arborea and therefore the end of every autonomist hope for the Sardinians, there was the depopulation and disappearance of hundreds of villages caused by war actions, recurrent plague epidemics and the enslavement of thousands of Sardinian prisoners deported to the Iberian territories of the Crown of Aragon and in particular in the Kingdom of Majorca.

== Bibliography ==
- Raimondo Carta Raspi, Storia della Sardegna, Milano, Mursia, 1981.
- Francesco Cesare Casula, Sardegna catalano-aragonese. Profilo storico, 2D Editrice Mediterranea, Sassari, 1984.
- Francesco Cesare Casula (1994). La Storia di Sardegna. Sassari: Delfino.
- Alessandra Cioppi, Battaglie e protagonisti della Sardegna medioevale, pp. 81–131, Cagliari, AM&D, 2008.
- Andrea Garau (2017). Mariano IV d'Arborea e la guerra nel Medioevo in Sardegna. Cagliari: Condaghes.
- Gian Giacomo Ortu, La Sardegna tra Arborea e Aragona, Il Maestrale, 2017.
