= Kingdom of Sardinia (1324–1720) =

Feudal state in Southern Europe

Kingdom of Sardinia Regnum Sardiniae (Latin) Regne de Sardenya (Catalan) Reino de Cerdeña (Spanish) Rennu de Sardigna (Sardinian) Regno di Sardegna (Italian) Regnu di Sardegna (Corsican)
- 1324–1720
- Flag Coat of arms

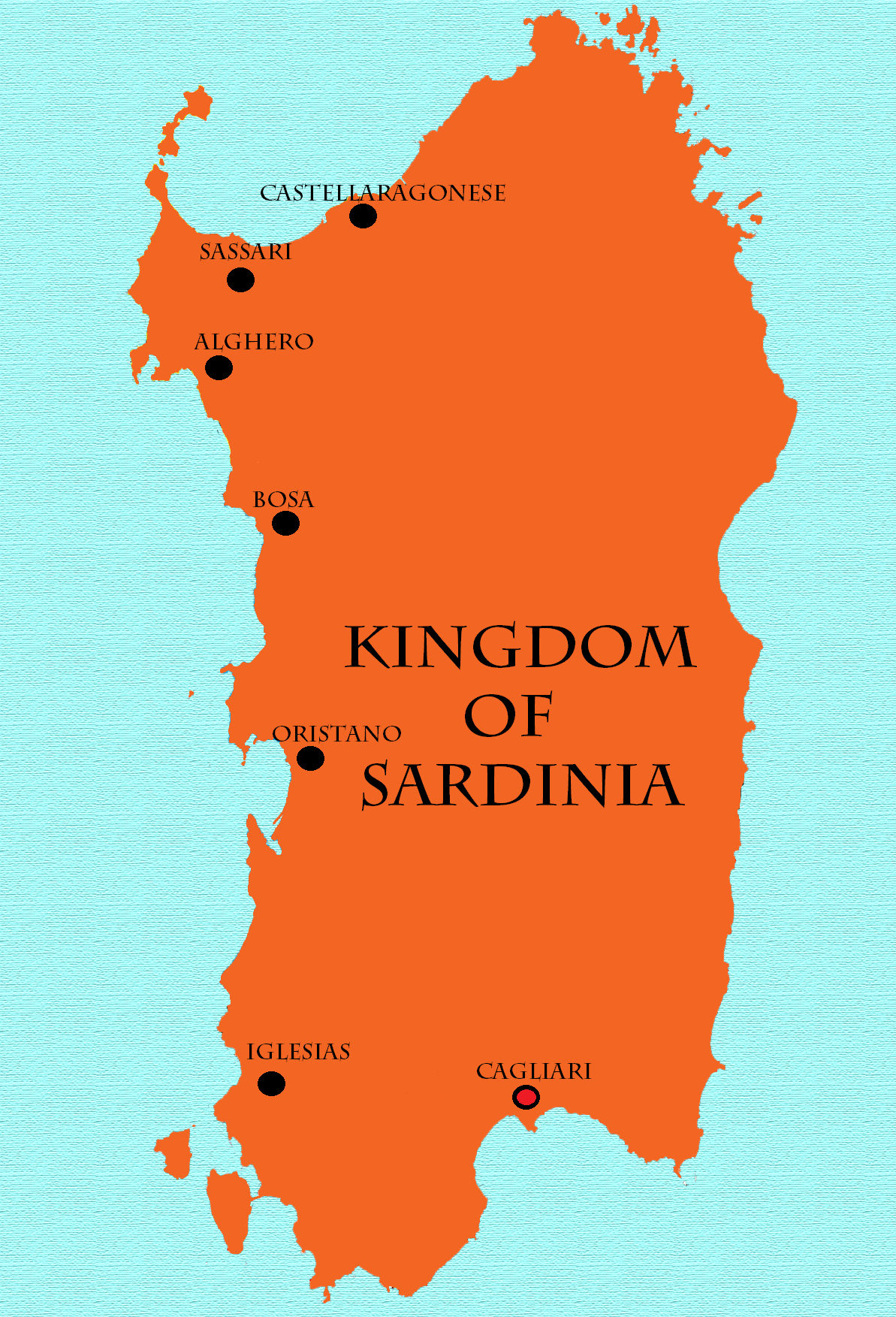
- Map of the Kingdom of Sardinia
- Status: Associate state of the Crown of Aragon and the Spanish Empire (1324–1708, 1717–1720); Part of Austria (1708–1717)
- Capital: Cagliari
- Common languages: Sardinian, Corsican, Catalan, and Spanish
- Religion: Roman Catholicism (official)
- Demonym: Sardinian
- Government: Feudal monarchy
- King
  - 1324–1327 (first): James II
  - 1720 (last before the Savoyard rule): Charles VI
- Historical era: Middle Ages; Early modern; Late modern
  - Papal investiture: 1297
  - Actual establishment: 1324
  - Became Habsburg: 1708
  - Spanish reconquest: 1717
  - Became part of Savoy: 1720
  - Perfect Fusion with Piedmont: 1847
- Currency: Cagliarese; Sardinian scudo
Preceded by
Judicate of Arborea
Republic of Pisa
Republic of Sassari
Crown of Aragon
Succeeded by
Kingdom of Sardinia (1720–1861)
- Today part of: Italy

The Kingdom of Sardinia was a feudal state in Southern Europe created in the early 14th century and a possession of the Crown of Aragon first and then of the Spanish Empire until 1708, then of the Habsburgs until 1717, and then of the Spanish Empire again until 1720.

The kingdom was a part of the Crown of Aragon and initially consisted of the islands of Sardinia and a claim to the island of Corsica, sovereignty over both of which was claimed by the papacy, which granted them as a fief, the Regnum Sardiniae et Corsicae (Kingdom of Sardinia and Corsica), (Note: The name of the state was originally Regnum Sardiniae or Regnum Sardiniae et Corsicae (when the kingdom was still considered to include Corsica) in Latin. It is Regno di Sardegna in Italian, Rennu de Sardigna [ˈrenːu ðɛ zaɾˈdiɲːa] in Sardinian, Regn ëd Sardëgna in Piedmontese, Regnu di Sardegna in Corsican, Reino de Cerdeña in Spanish, Regne de Sardenya [ˈrɛŋnə ðə səɾˈðɛɲə] in Catalan, and Royaume de Sardaigne in French. Despite this, every king of Sardinia continued to retain the nominal title of Rex Corsicae (King of Corsica). The kingdom was initially called Regnum Sardiniae et Corsicae, in that it was originally meant to also include the neighbouring island of Corsica, until its status as a Genoese land was eventually acknowledged by Ferdinand II of Aragon, who dropped the last original bit mentioning Corsica in 1479.) to King James II of Aragon in 1297. Beginning in 1324, James and his successors conquered the island of Sardinia and established de facto their de jure authority. In 1420, after the Sardinian–Aragonese war, the last competing claim to the island was bought out. After the union of the crowns of Aragon and Castile, Sardinia became a part of the burgeoning Spanish Empire.

In 1720, the island was ceded by the Habsburg and Bourbon claimants to the Spanish throne to the Duke of Savoy, Victor Amadeus II of Savoy. Sardinia retained its autonomous institutions according to the treaty of cession until 1847, when King Charles Albert enacted the Perfect Fusion, which expanded to the island the centralized administrative system which was adopted by the mainland Savoyard state during the Napoleonic era.

== Early history ==
In 238 BC, Sardinia became, along with Corsica, a joint province of the Roman Republic. The Romans ruled the island until the middle of the 5th century when it was occupied by the Vandals, who had also settled in north Africa. In 534 AD it was reconquered by the Eastern Roman (Byzantine) Empire. It remained a Byzantine province until the Muslim conquest of Sicily in the 9th century. After that, communications with the Byzantine capital, Constantinople, became very difficult, and powerful families of the island assumed control of the land.

Starting from 705 to 706, Saracens from north Africa (recently conquered by Arab armies) harassed the population of the coastal cities. Facing Arab attempts to sack and conquer the island, while having almost no outside help, Sardinia used the principle of translatio imperii ("transfer of rule") and continued to organize itself along the ancient Roman and Byzantine model. The island was not the personal property of the ruler and of his family, as was then the dominant practice in western Europe, but rather a separate entity and during the Byzantine rule, a monarchical republic, as it had been since Roman times.

Information about the Sardinian political situation in the following centuries is scarce. Due to Saracen attacks, in the 9th century Tharros was abandoned in favor of Oristano, after more than 1800 years of occupation; Caralis, Porto Torres, and numerous other coastal centres suffered the same fate. There is a record of another massive Saracen sea attack in 1015–16 from the Balearics, commanded by Mujāhid al-ʿĀmirī (Latinized as Museto). The Saracen attempt to invade the island was stopped by the Judicates with the support of the fleets of the maritime republics of Pisa and Genoa. Pope Benedict VIII also requested aid from the two maritime republics in the struggle against the Arabs.

After the East–West Schism, Rome made many efforts to restore Latinity to the Sardinian church, politics and society, and to finally reunify the island under one Catholic ruler, as it had been for all of southern Italy, when the Byzantines had been driven away by Catholic Normans. Even the title of "Judge" was a Byzantine reminder of the Greek church and state, in times of harsh relations between eastern and western churches (Massacre of the Latins, 1182, Siege of Constantinople (1204), Recapture of Constantinople, 1261).

Before the Kingdom of Sardinia and Corsica, the archons (Ancient Greek: ἄρχοντες), or judices in Latin, who reigned in the island from the 9th or 10th century until the beginning of the 11th century, can be considered real kings of all Sardinia (Κύριε βοήθε ιοῦ δούλου σου Tουρκοτουρίου ἅρχωντοσ Σαρδινίας καί τής δούλης σου Γετιτ), even though nominal vassals of the Byzantine emperors. Of these sovereigns, only two names are known: Turcoturiu and Salusiu (Tουρκοτουρίου βασιλικοῦ πρωτοσπαθαρίου (καὶ Σαλουσίου των εὐγενεστάτων ἀρχόντων), who probably ruled in the 10th century. The archons still wrote in Greek or Latin, but one of the oldest documents left of the Judicate of Cagliari (the Carta Volgare), issued by Torchitorio I de Lacon-Gunale in 1070, was already written in the Romance Sardinian language, albeit with the Greek alphabet.

The realm was divided into four small kingdoms, the Judicates of Cagliari, Arborea, Gallura and Logudoro, perfectly organized as was the previous realm, but was now under the influence of the papacy, which claimed sovereignty over the entire island, and in particular of the Italian states of Genoa and Pisa, that through alliances with the "judges" (the local rulers), secured their political and economic zones of influence. While Genoa was mostly, but not always, in the north and west regions of Sardinia, that is, in the Judicates of Gallura and Logudoro; Pisa was mostly, but not always, in the south and east, in the Judicates of Cagliari and Arborea. That was the cause of conflicts leading to a long war between the Judges, who regarded themselves as kings fighting against rebellious nobles.

Later, the title of King of Sardinia was granted by the Emperor of the Holy Roman Empire to Barisone II of Arborea, and subsequently also to Enzio of Sardinia. The first could not reunify the island under his rule, despite years of war against the other Sardinian judges, and he finally concluded a peace treaty with them in 1172. The second did not have the opportunity. Invested with the title from his father, Emperor Frederick II in 1239, he was soon recalled by his parent and appointed Imperial Vicar for Italy. He died in 1272 without direct recognized heirs after a detention of 23 years in a prison in Bologna.

The Kingdom of Sardinia and Corsica, later only the Kingdom of Sardinia from 1460, was a state whose king was the King of Aragon, who started to conquer it in 1324, gained full control in 1410, and directly ruled it until 1460. In that year it was incorporated into a sort of confederation of states, each with its own institutions, called the Crown of Aragon, and united only in the person of the king. The Crown of Aragon was made by a council of representatives of the various states and grew in importance for the main purpose of separating the legacy of Ferdinand II of Aragon from that of Isabella I of Castile when they married in 1469.

The idea of the kingdom was created in 1297 by Pope Boniface VIII, as a hypothetical entity created for James II of Aragon under a secret clause in the Treaty of Anagni. This was an inducement to join in the effort to restore Sicily, then under the rule of James's brother Frederick III of Sicily, to the Angevin dynasty over the oppositions of the Sicilians. The two islands proposed for this new kingdom were occupied by other states and fiefs at the time. In Sardinia, three of the four states that had succeeded Byzantine imperial rule in the 9th century had passed through marriage and partition under the direct or indirect control of Pisa and Genoa in the 40 years preceding the Treaty of Anagni. Genoa had also ruled Corsica since conquering the island nearly two centuries before (c. 1133).

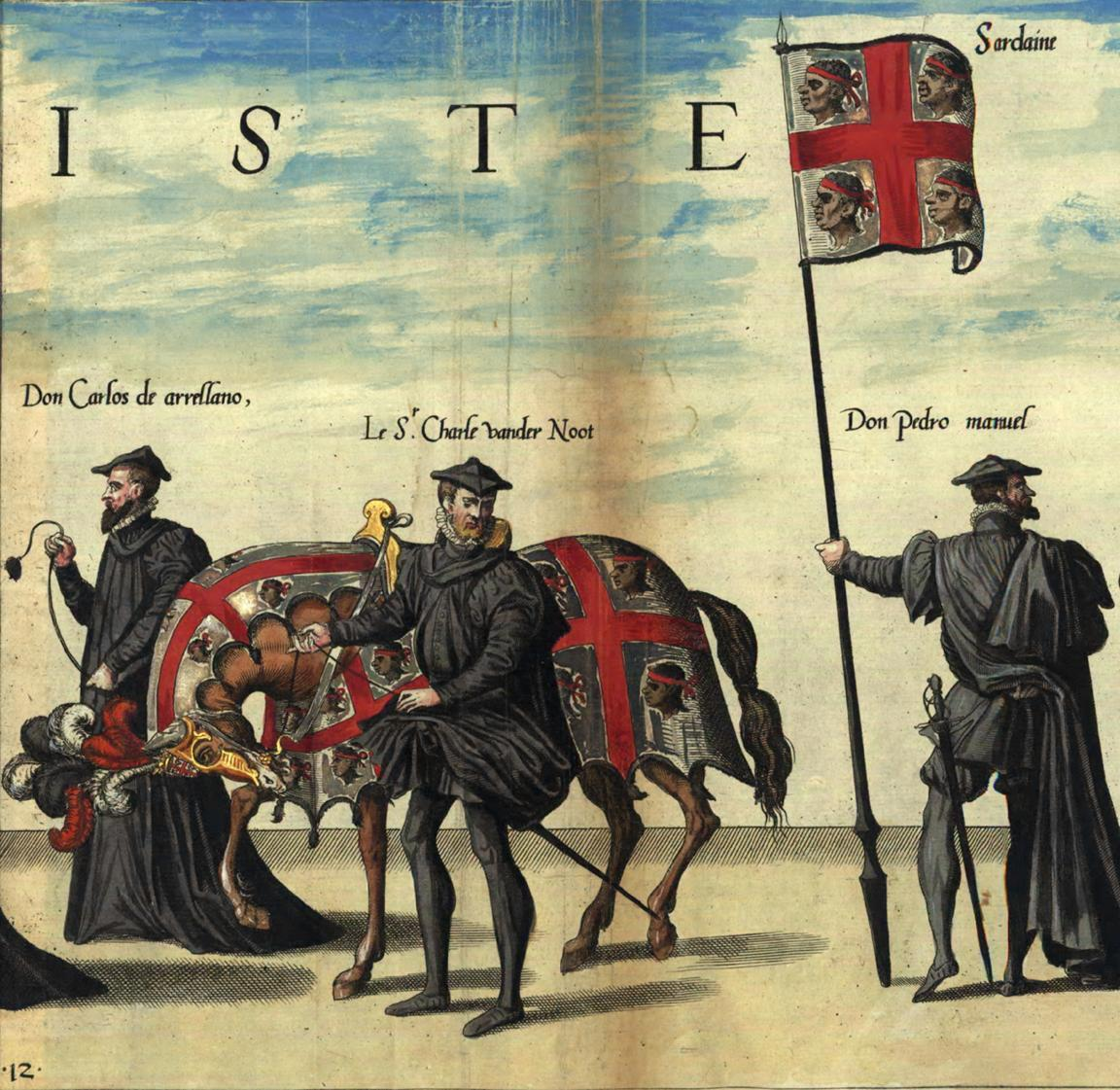
The flag of the Kingdom of Sardinia at the funeral ceremony of Charles V

There were other reasons beside this papal decision: it was the final successful result of the long fight against the Ghibelline (pro-imperial) city of Pisa and the Holy Roman Empire itself. Furthermore, Sardinia was then under the control of the very Catholic kings of Aragon, and the last result of rapprochement of the island to Rome. The Sardinian church had never been under the control of the Ecumenical Patriarchate of Constantinople; it was an autonomous province loyal to Rome and belonging to the Latin Church, but during the Byzantine period became influenced by Byzantine liturgy and culture.

== Foundation of the Kingdom of Sardinia ==
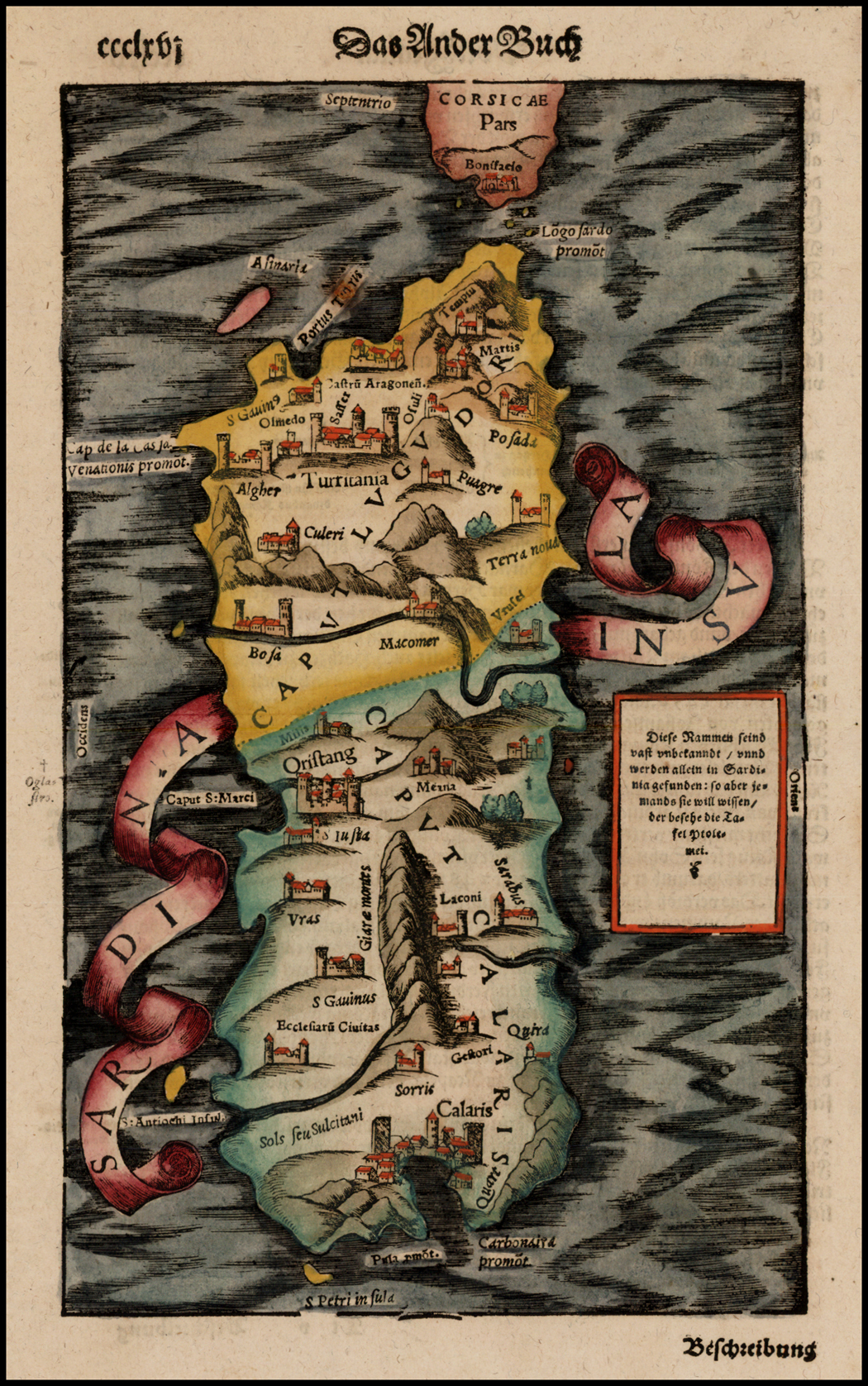
The Kingdom of Sardinia in a 16th-century map

In 1297, Pope Boniface VIII, intervening between the Houses of Anjou and Aragon, established on paper a Regnum Sardiniae et Corsicae that would be a fief of the papacy. Then, ignoring the indigenous states which already existed, the pope offered his newly invented fief to James II of Aragon, promising him papal support should he wish to conquer Pisan Sardinia in exchange for Sicily. In 1323 James II formed an alliance with Hugh II of Arborea and, following a military campaign which lasted a year or so, occupied the Pisan territories of Cagliari and Gallura along with the city of Sassari, claiming the territory as the Kingdom of Sardinia and Corsica.

In 1353, Arborea waged war on Aragon. The Crown of Aragon did not reduce the last of the judicates (indigenous kingdoms of Sardinia) until 1420. The Kingdom of Sardinia and Corsica retained its separate character as part of the Crown of Aragon and was not merely incorporated into the Kingdom of Aragon. At the time of his struggles with Arborea, Peter IV of Aragon granted an autonomous legislature to the kingdom and its legal traditions. The kingdom was governed in the king's name by a viceroy.

In 1420, Alfonso V of Aragon, King of Sicily and heir to Aragon, bought the remaining territories of the Judicate of Arborea for 100,000 gold florins from the last judge, William III of Narbonne. After that transaction, the Kingdom of Sardinia extended throughout the island, except for the city of Castelsardo (at that time called Casteldoria or Castelgenovese) that was stolen from the Doria in 1448, and renamed Castillo Aragonés (Aragonese Castle).

Corsica, which had never been conquered, was dropped from the formal title and Sardinia passed with the Crown of Aragon to a united Spain. The defeat of the local kingdoms, communes and signorie, the firm Aragonese (later Spanish) rule, the introduction of a sterile feudalism, as well as the discovery of the Americas, provoked an unstoppable decline of the Kingdom of Sardinia. A short period of uprisings occurred under the local noble Leonardo Alagon, Marquess of Oristano, who defended his territories against Viceroy Nicolò Carroz and managed to defeat the viceroy's army in the 1470s, but was later crushed at the Battle of Macomer in 1478, ending any further revolts in the island. The unceasing attacks from north African pirates and a series of plagues (in 1582, 1652 and 1655) further worsened the situation.

=== Aragonese conquest of Sardinia ===
Although the "Kingdom of Sardinia and Corsica" could be said to have started as a questionable and extraordinary de jure state in 1297, its de facto existence began in 1324 when, called by their allies of the Judicate of Arborea in the course of war with the Republic of Pisa, James II seized the Pisan territories in the former states of Cagliari and Gallura and asserted his papally-approved title. In 1347, Aragon made war on landlords of the Doria House and the Malaspina House, who were citizens of the Republic of Genoa, which controlled most of the lands of the former Logudoro state in north-western Sardinia, including the city of Alghero and the semiautonomous Republic of Sassari, and added them to its direct domains.

The Judicate of Arborea, the only Sardinian state that remained independent of foreign domination, proved far more difficult to subdue. Threatened by the Aragonese claims of suzerainty and consolidation of the rest of the island, in 1353 Arborea, under the leadership of Marianus IV, started the conquest of the remaining Sardinian territories, which formed the Kingdom of Sardinia. In 1368 an Arborean offensive succeeded in nearly driving the Aragonese from the island, reducing the Kingdom of Sardinia and Corsica to just the port cities of Cagliari and Alghero, and incorporating everything else into their own kingdom.

A peace treaty returned the Aragonese their previous possessions in 1388 but tensions continued. In 1382, the Arborean army led by Brancaleone Doria again swept most of the island into Arborean rule. This situation lasted until 1409 when the army of the Judicate of Arborea suffered a heavy defeat by the Aragonese army in the Battle of Sanluri. After the sale of the remaining territories for 100,000 gold florins to the Judicate of Arborea in 1420, the Kingdom of Sardinia extended throughout the island, except for the city of Castelsardo (at that time called Casteldoria or Castelgenovese), which had been stolen from the Doria in 1448. The subduing of Sardinia having taken a century, Corsica, which had never been wrestled from the Genoese, was dropped from the formal title of the Kingdom.

In 1527, during the Franco-Spanish War, a French army of 4000 men led by the Italian Renzo da Ceri attacked the north of the island, besieging Castellaragonese and sacking Sorso and then Sassari for almost a month. In 1566, the first typography of Sardinia was established in Cagliari, while in 1607 and 1617 were founded the University of Cagliari and the University of Sassari. In the late 15th and in the early 16th century the Spaniards built watchtowers all along the coast (today called "Spanish towers") to protect the island against Ottoman incursions. In 1637 a French fleet led by Henri, Count of Harcourt sacked Oristano for about a week.

== Exchange of Sardinia for Sicily ==
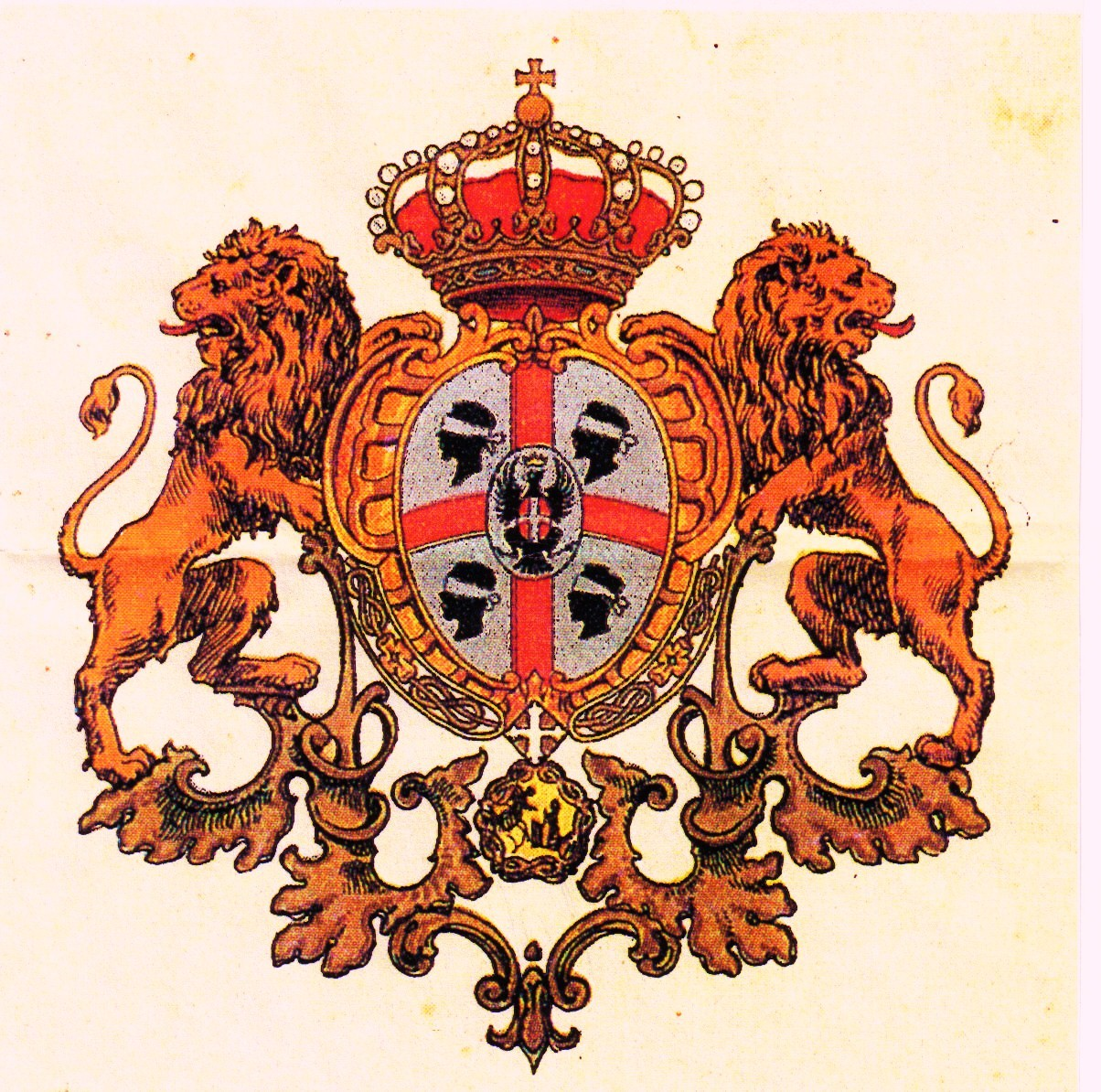
19th-century coat of arms of the Kingdom of Sardinia under the Savoy dynasty

The Spanish domination of Sardinia ended at the beginning of the 18th century, as a result of the War of the Spanish Succession. By the Treaty of Utrecht of 1713, Spain's European empire was divided: Savoy received Sicily and parts of the Duchy of Milan, while Charles VI (the Holy Roman Emperor and Archduke of Austria), received the Spanish Netherlands, the Kingdom of Naples, Sardinia, and the bulk of the Duchy of Milan.

During the War of the Quadruple Alliance, Victor Amadeus II, Duke of Savoy, Prince of Piedmont, and by now also King of Sicily, had to agree to yield Sicily to the Austrian Habsburgs and receive Sardinia in exchange. The exchange was formally ratified in the Treaty of The Hague of 17 February 1720. Because the Kingdom of Sardinia had existed since the 14th century, the exchange allowed Victor Amadeus to retain the title of king in spite of the loss of Sicily.

Victor Amadeus initially resisted the exchange, and until 1723 he continued to style himself King of Sicily rather than King of Sardinia. The state took the official title of Kingdom of Sardinia, Cyprus and Jerusalem, as the House of Savoy still claimed the thrones of Cyprus and Jerusalem, although both had long been under Ottoman rule. Under the Perfect Fusion of 1847, the local Sardinian institutions including the Viceroy were abolished; however, the title of King of Sardinia was maintained by the House of Savoy until their fall from the Italian throne in 1946.

== Flags, royal standards, and coats of arms ==
Coats of arms

Middle Ages (union with Aragon)

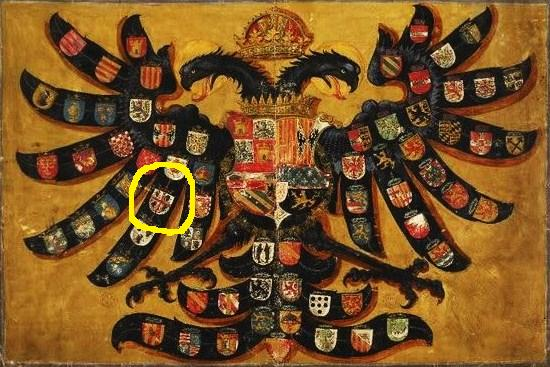
Imperial Eagle of Roman Holy Emperor Charles V with the four Moors of the Kingdom of Sardinia (16th century)
State flags

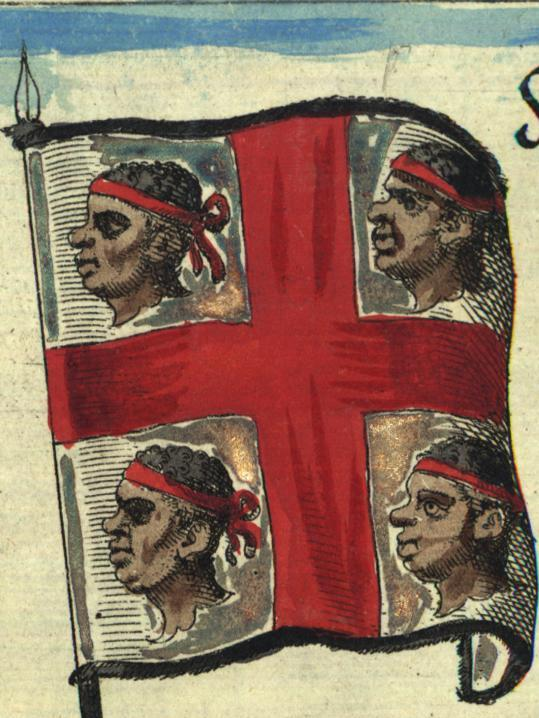
Flag of the Kingdom of Sardinia in 1568

== Maps ==
=== Territorial evolution of Sardinia from 1324 to 1720 ===
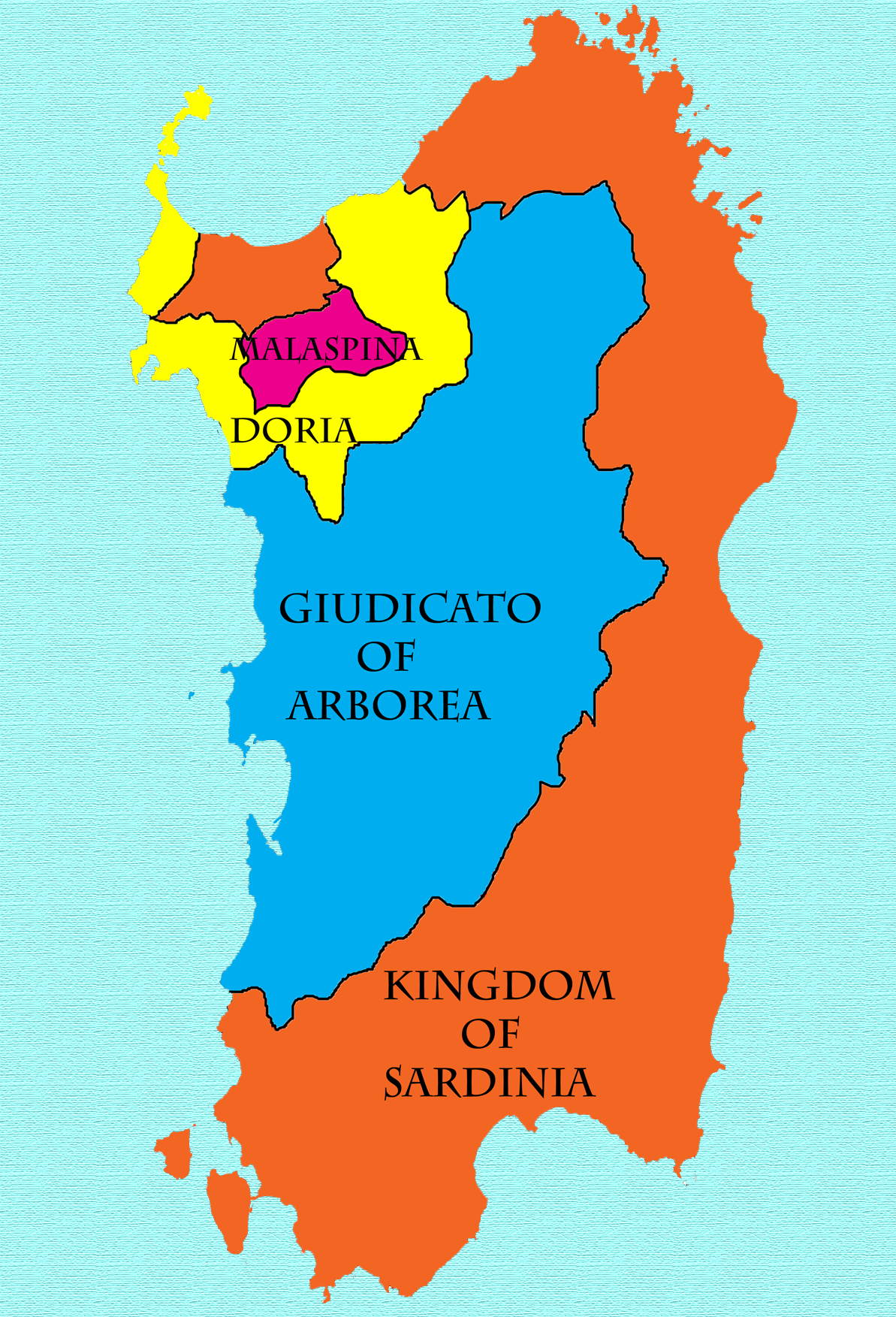
The political situation in Sardinia after 1324 when the Aragonese conquered the Republic of Pisan territories of Sardinia, which included the defunct Judicate of Cagliari and Gallura.

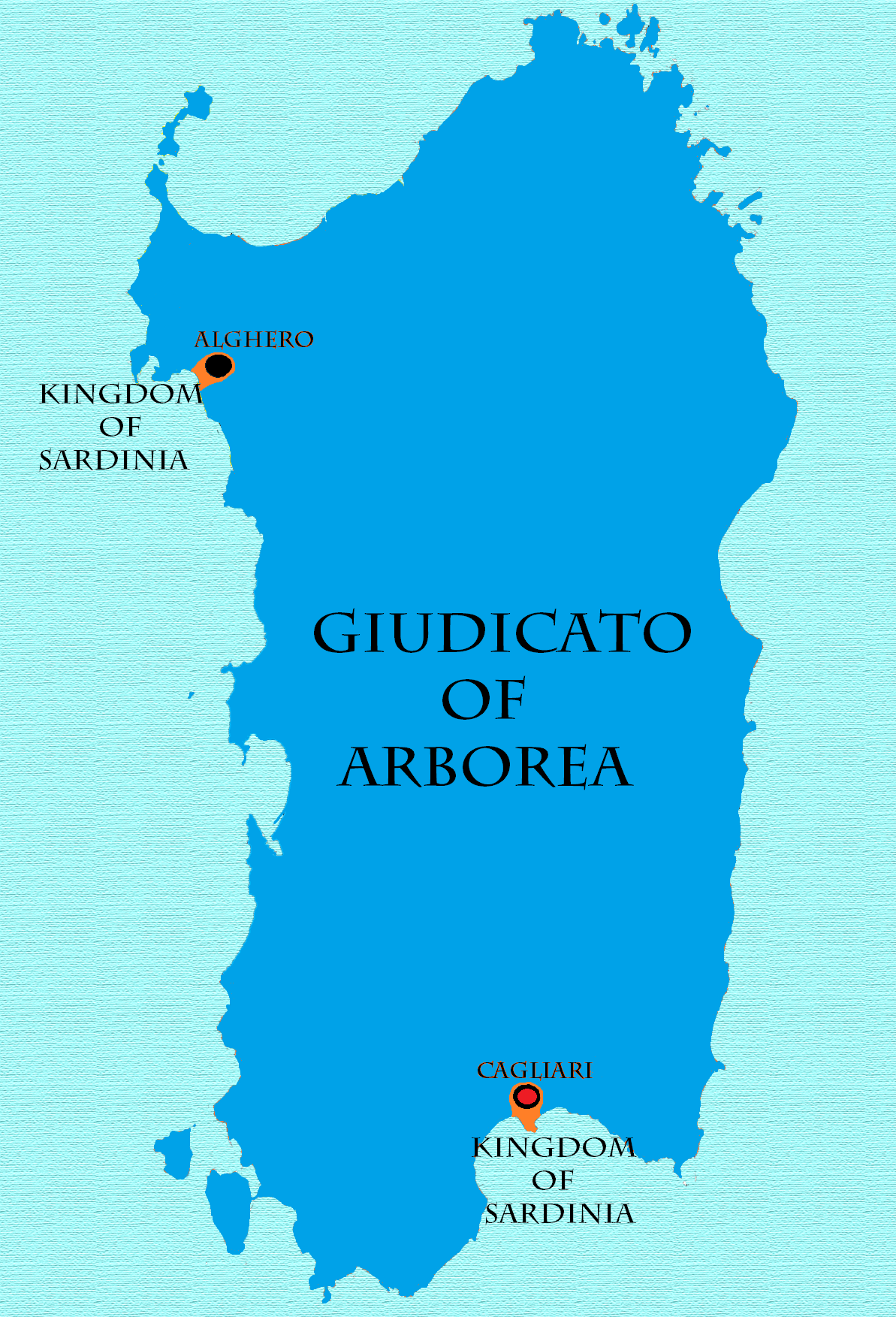
The Kingdom of Sardinia from 1368 to 1388 and 1392 to 1409, after the wars with Arborea, consisted of only the cities of Cagliari and Alghero.

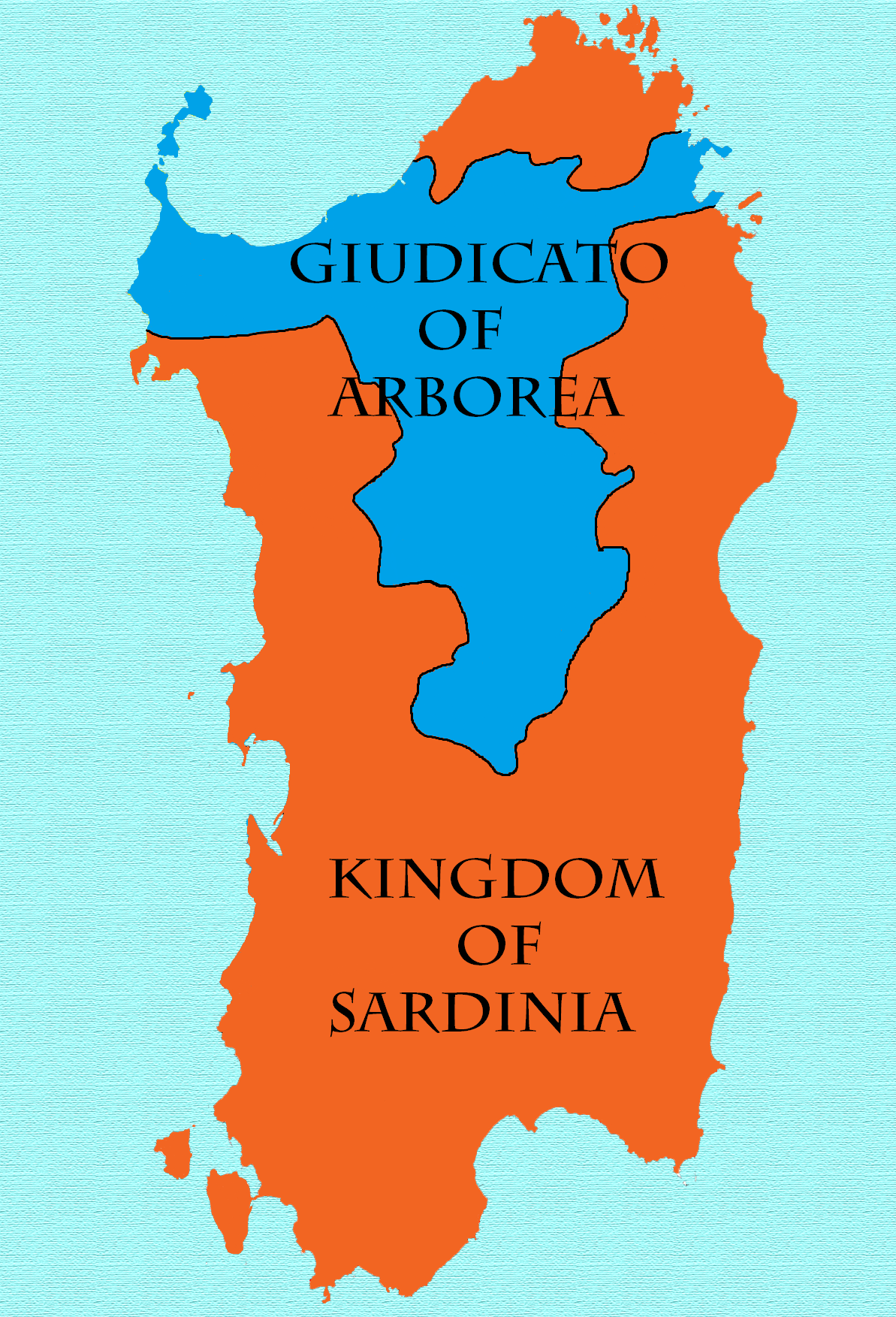
The Kingdom of Sardinia from 1410 to 1420, after the defeat of the Arborean Judicate in the Battle of Sanluri (1409)

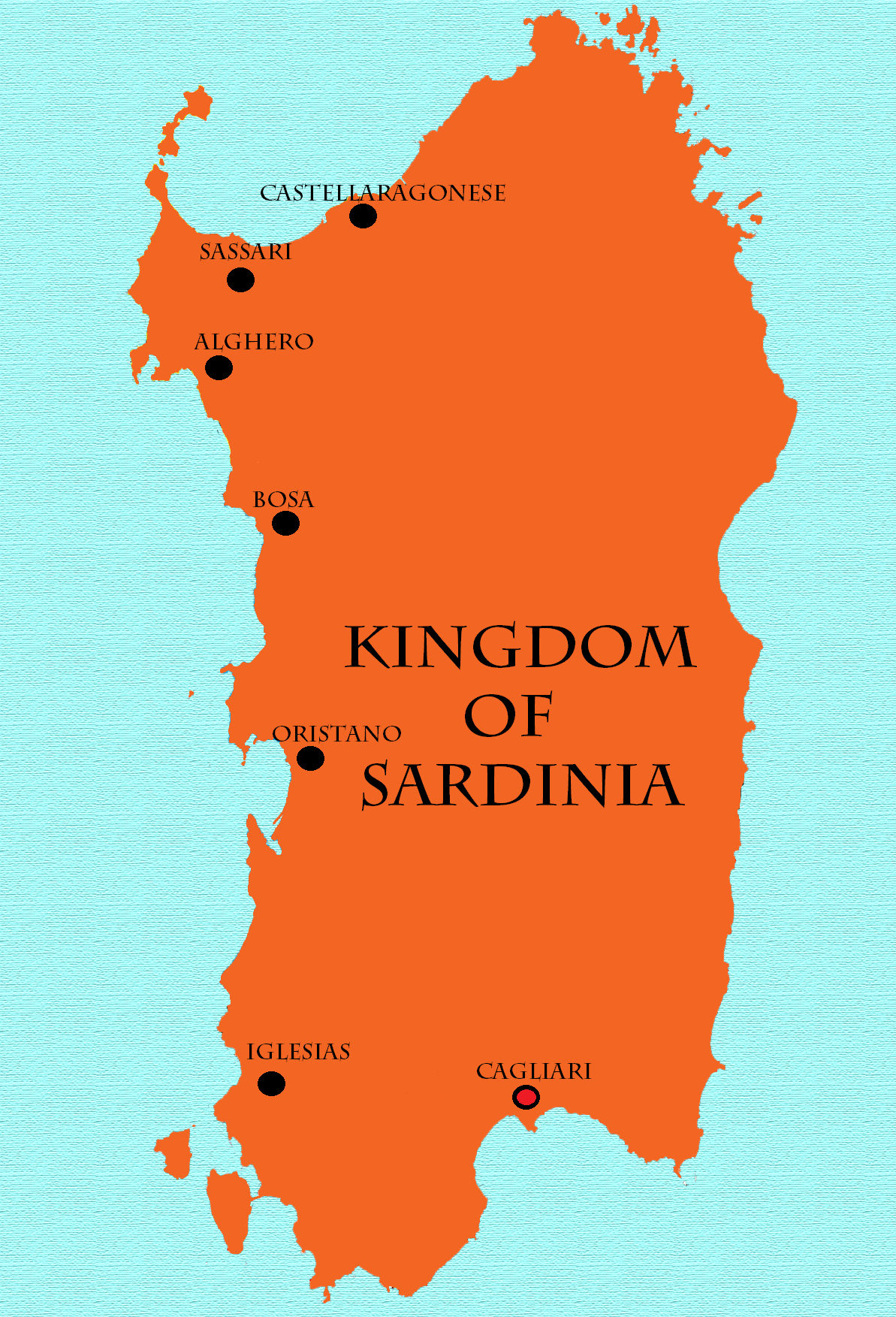
The Kingdom of Sardinia from 1448 to 1720; the Maddalena archipelago was conquered in 1767–1769.

== See also ==
- List of viceroys of Sardinia

== Bibliography ==
- Luttwak, Edward (2009). The Grand Strategy of the Byzantine Empire. The Belknap Press. ISBN 9780674035195.
- Schena, Olivetta (2019). "The Role Played by Towns in Parliamentary Commissions in the Kingdom of Sardinia in the Fifteenth and Sixteenth centuries". Parliaments, Estates and Representation. '39 (3): 304–315.

=== In Italian ===
- AAVV. (edited by F. Manconi), La società sarda in età spagnola, Consiglio Regionale della Sardegna, Cagliari, 2 volumes, 1992–1993.
- Blasco Ferrer Eduardo, Crestomazia Sarda dei primi secoli, collection Officina Linguistica, Ilisso, Nuoro, 2003, ISBN 9788887825657.
- Boscolo Alberto, La Sardegna bizantina e alto giudicale, Edizioni Della Torre, Cagliari, 1978.
- Casula, Francesco Cesare (1994). La storia di Sardegna. Sassari: Carlo Delfino Editore. ISBN 8871380843.
- Coroneo Roberto, Arte in Sardegna dal IV alla metà dell'XI secolo, AV eds., Cagliari, 2011.
- Coroneo Roberto, Scultura mediobizantina in Sardegna, Nuoro, Poliedro, 2000.
- Gallinari Luciano, "Il Giudicato di Cagliari tra XI e XIII secolo. Proposte di interpretazioni istituzionali", in Rivista dell'Istituto di Storia dell'Europa Mediterranea, no. 5, 2010.
- Manconi Francesco, La Sardegna al tempo degli Asburgo, Il Maestrale, Nuoro, 2010, ISBN 9788864290102.
- Manconi Francesco, Una piccola provincia di un grande impero, CUEC, Cagliari, 2012, ISBN 8884677882.
- Mastino Attilio, Storia della Sardegna Antica, Il Maestrale, Nuoro, 2005, ISBN 9788889801635.
- Meloni Piero, La Sardegna Romana, Chiarella, Sassari, 1980.
- Motzo Bachisio Raimondo, Studi sui bizantini in Sardegna e sull'agiografia sarda, Deputazione di Storia Patria della Sardegna, Cagliari, 1987.
- Ortu Gian Giacomo, La Sardegna dei Giudici, Il Maestrale, Nuoro, 2005, ISBN 9788889801024.
- Paulis Giulio, Lingua e cultura nella Sardegna bizantina: testimonianze linguistiche dell'influsso greco, Sassari, L'Asfodelo, 1983.
- Spanu Luigi, Cagliari nel seicento, Edizioni Castello, Cagliari, 1999.
- Zedda Corrado and Pinna Raimondo, "La nascita dei Giudicati. Proposta per lo scioglimento di un enigma storiografico", in Archivio Storico Giuridico di Sassari, second series, no. 12, 2007.
