= Castle of Gioiosa Guardia =

Castle in Italy

- Castello di Gioiosa Guardia
- Villamassargia
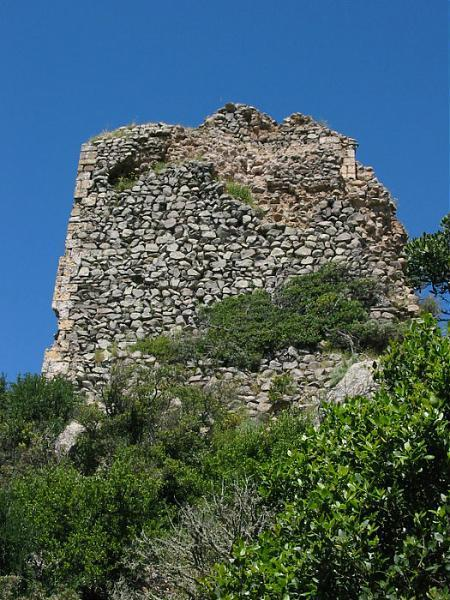
- Castle in Villamassargia

Site information
- Type: Castle

Location
- Coordinates: 39.259974°N 8.673484°E

Site history
- Built: 12-13th century

The Castle of Gioiosa Guardia (Italian: Castello di Gioiosa Guardia) is a medieval castle in Villamassargia, province of South Sardinia, Italy.

== History ==
The castle was probably built by the Della Gherardesca which became masters of the south-west of Sardinia after the partition of Giudicato of Cagliari that took place in 1258. However, according to another hypothesis, its construction would be dated to the 12th century, during the reign of William I of Cagliari.

It's located on the border between the territory of Ugolino della Gherardesca (curatoria of Cixerri) and the heirs of Gherardo della Gherardesca (curatoria of Sulcis, Nora and Decimo). It was occupied for a short period, between 1290 and 1295 approximately, from Guelfo della Gherardesca, son of the late Count Ugolino, who was trying to conquer the land held by the other Della Gherardesca: Ranieri and Boniface.

Following the wars between the giudicato of Arborea and the Kingdom of Sardinia, the castle assumed again a military function; the documents show that it was conquered and occupied temporarily by Brancaleone Doria, husband of Eleanor of Arborea.

The castle, in later centuries, passed into the hands of various Aragonese feudal lords.

== Bibliography ==
- Anna Paola Deiana - Il castello di Gioiosa Guardia: fonti e testimonianze archeologiche, Ed. S'Alvure, 2003 - 137 pagine
