= Marquisate of Oristano =

Sardinian state (1410–1478)

Coat of arms of the Marquisate of Oristano

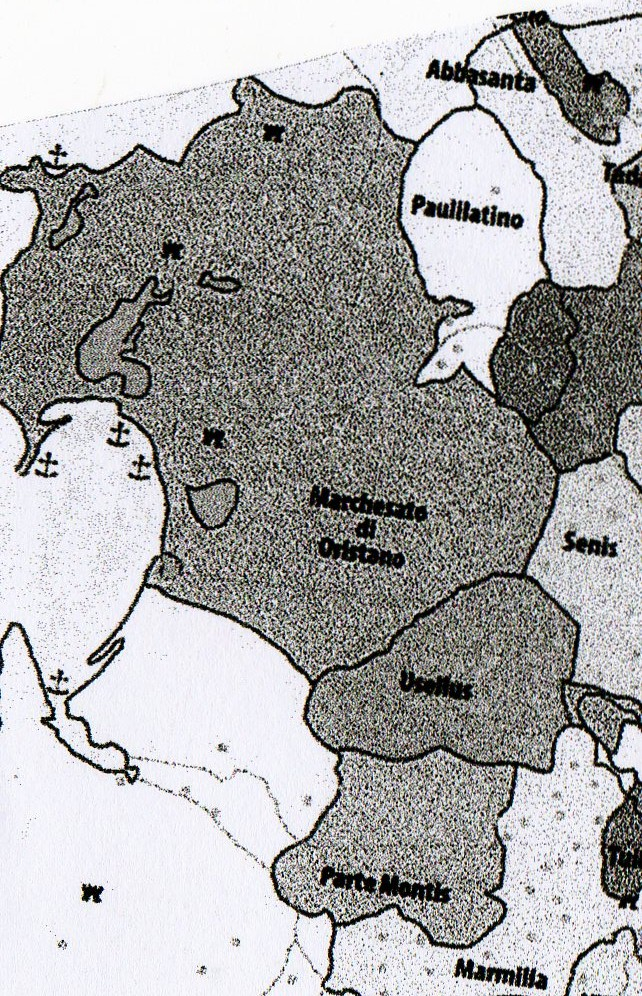
Marquisate of Oristano

The Marquisate of Oristano was a marquisate of Sardinia that lasted from 1410 until 1478

== History ==
The marquisate was created following the death of Marianus V of Arborea, the second son of Eleanor of Arborea, when the giudicato of Arborea was subjected permanently to the Crown of Aragon (despite the objections of William III of Narbonne) , with the exception of a limited area around Oristano. This new fiefdom, together with the county of Goceano, was assigned by King Martin I of Aragon to Leonardo Cubello, who descended in direct male line from Guidicato Hugh II of Arborea (1321-1336).

It was created from the most fertile and strategic part of the ancient giudicato: the Campidano of Cabras, Simaxis and Milis, the curatoria of Bonorzuli, the county of Goceano (with its castle) and the walled town of Oristano.

In 1478, following the defeat of Leonardo Alagon, the title of Marquis of Oristano passed to the King of Aragon (as a ruler of Sardinia) and the city of Oristano become a royal city.

== Marquises of Oristano and counts of Goceano ==
N°	Title	Name	From	To	Spouse
1	Marquise and Count	Leonardo I Cubello-de Serra Bas	1410	1427	Quirica Deyana
2	Marquise and Count	Antonio I Cubello-de Serra Bas	1427	1455	Eleonora Folch de Cardona
3	Marquise and Count	Salvatore I Cubello-de Serra Bas	1455	1470	Caterina Centelles de Oliva
4	Marquise and Count	Leonardo II Alagon Cubello-de Serra Bas	1470	1478	Maria Linan de Morillo

== Bibliography ==
- AA. VV., Giudicato di Arborea e Marchesato di Oristano, S'Alvure, Oristano 2000.
- Giovanni Boassa, Due battaglie che cambiarono il destino della Sardegna, PTM, Mogoro 2012.
- Alberto Boscolo, Leonardo Alagon, <Dizionario Biografico degli Italiani>, vol. I, Treccani, Roma 1960.
- Raimondo Carta Raspi, La Sardegna nell'alto Medioevo, Il Nuraghe, Cagliari 1935.
- Id., Storia della Sardegna, Mursia, Milano 1974.
- Franco Cuccu, La Città dei Giudici, I, pp. 225–241, S'Alvure, Oristano 1996.
- Pietro Carboni, La battaglia di Macomer, La Biblioteca della Nuova Sardegna, Sassari 2013.
- Id., Leonardo Alagon, I-II, La Biblioteca della Nuova Sardegna, Sassari 2013.
- Alessandra Cioppi, Battaglie e protagonisti della Sardegna medievale, AM-D, Cagliari 2008.
- Giovanni Francesco Fara, De Rebus Sardois II, Gallizzi, Sassari 1992.
- Francesco Floris, Feudi e feudatari in Sardegna, pp. 164–167, ed. Della Torre, Cagliari 1996.
- Proto Arca Sardo, De bello et interitu Marchionis Oristanei, CUEC, Cagliari 2003.
- Evandro Putzulu, Cubello Leonardo, <Dizionario Biografico degli Italiani>, vol. 31, Treccani, Roma 1985.
- Carlos Sarthou Carreres, El castillo di Jàtiva y sus històricos prisioneros, E.P.V., Valencia 1951.
- Arnaldo Satta-Branca, La Sardegna attraverso i secoli, Fossataro, Cagliari 1966.
- Mirella Scarpa Senes, La guerra e la disfatta del Marchese di Oristano dal manoscritto di G. Proto Arca, ed. Castello, Cagliari 1997.
- Franciscu Sedda, La vera storia della bandiera dei sardi, Condaghes, Cagliari 2007.
- Giovanni Serra, Villasor, Grafica del Parteolla, Dolianova 1995.
- Pasquale Tola, Dizionario biografico degli uomini illustri di Sardegna, I, pp. 58–68 (Alagon), pp. 255–259 (Cubello), Chirio e Mina, Torino 1837/1838.
