= Brancaleone Doria =

14th-century Genoese nobleman

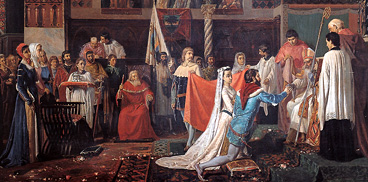
Marriage of Eleanor and Brancaleone

Brancaleone succeeded in conquering most of Sardinia, including the former free republic of Sassari, and extending Arborean control over the other provinces.

Brancaleone Doria was the husband of Eleanor of Arborea, regent of the Giudicato of Arborea on the island of Sardinia in the late 14th century. He was a scion of the influential Doria family of the Republic of Genoa, the son of the elder Brancaleone and a woman named Giacomina. On 16 March 1357, he became a vassal of Peter IV of Aragon, the nominal King of Sardinia, to make legitimate the possessions of his father on the island.

When Hugh III of Arborea, Eleanor's brother, sought out a matrimonial alliance with Genoa, his choice for a brother-in-law fell on Brancaleone. The marriage took place in 1376, a political alliance only, for the Bas-Serra family of Eleanor was opposed to the royal pretensions of the House of Barcelona, to which Brancaleone was affiliated. Already at the time of his marriage, he had illegitimate children, Giannettino and Nicholas, by an anonymous woman.

When Hugh was assassinated in 1383, Eleanor and Brancaleone's young son Frederick succeeded as the ruler of the Giudicato of Arborea. At that time, Brancaleone was in Catalonia to receive the honorific title of "Count of Monteleone and Baron of Lower Marmilla". As soon as Peter IV heard of the election of Frederick, he arrested Brancaleone and sent him to Cagliari to be imprisoned first in the tower of Pancrazio and then in that of Elefante. Arborea was governed in the meantime by Eleanor.

Frederick, later seized and imprisoned by Peter himself, died young and in captivity. He was succeeded by Brancaleone's second son, Marianus V. Brancaleone was finally liberated on 1 January 1390, by which time his loyalty to the Aragonese crown was broken.

On 1 April 1391, Brancaleone marched on Castel di Cagliari and, on 16 August, occupied Sassari and Osilo with his son Marianus. In September, he conquered the castles of Fava, Galtellì, Bonvehì, and Pedreso. Only Alghero and Longosardo remained in Aragonese hands. On 3 October, he entered Villa di Chiesa. In a letter written at Sanluri on 3 February 1392, he announced having repossessed all the territories lost to the Aragonese in 1388. On 16 March 1392, a fleet under Martin of Aragon appeared off Capo San Marco, conducted from Sicily for the purpose of putting down Brancaleone's "rebellion". The attempt failed.

Following Marianus' death, Arborea passed to William III of Narbonne. Brancaleone retired to his estates at Monteleone. He disappears from the record mysteriously before the Battle of Sanluri in 1409.

== Sources ==
- Boscolo, Alberto Boscolo (1962). La politica italiana di Martino il Vecchio re d'Aragona. Padova: CEDAM.
- Casula, Francesco Cesare (2003). Eleonora: regina del regno di Arborèa. Sassari: Carlo Delfino. ISBN 978-88-7138-306-4.
- Cioppi, Alessandra (2008). Battaglie e protagonisti della Sardegna medioevale. I griot tascabili. Cagliari: AM&D. ISBN 978-88-95462-15-8.
- Fusero, Clemente (1973). I Doria. Milano: Dall'Oglio.
- Lingua, Paolo (2007). I Doria a Genova, una dinastia mancata. Genova: Frilli. ISBN 978-88-55037-94-5.
- Luzzatto Guerrini, Teresa (1937). I Doria. Firenze: Nemi.
- Marco Milanese, ed. (2005). Monteleone Rocca Doria. Il Parco Grazia Deledda: la storia, il paesaggio. Conoscere il Nord della Sardegna. Sassari: Mediando. ISBN 978-88-89502-07-5.
- Rassu, Massimo (2007). Rocche turrite. Guida ai castelli medievali della Sardegna. Urbs. Dolianova (Cagliari): Grafica del Parteolla. ISBN 978-88-89978-28-3.
- Spiga, Giuseppe (1992). Guida al "Pantheon" degli Arborea a San Gavino Monreale. Sassari: Carlo Delfino. ISBN 978-88-71380-50-6.
