= Judicate of Arborea =

Sardinian kingdom (11th century – 1420)

Judicate of Arborea Iudicatus Arborensis (Latin) Judicadu de Arbaree (Sardinian)
- 11th century–1420
- Flag Coat of arms

- Map of the state's borders (not permanent)
- Status: Judicate; Kingdom
- Capital: Tharros (until 1070); Oristano (1070–1410); Sassari (1410–1420)
- Common languages: Sardinian, Latin
- Religion: Roman Catholicism
- Government: Monarchy
- Judge
  - 1060–1070: Marianus I of Arborea
  - 1347–1376: Marianus IV of Arborea
  - 1383–1402: Eleanor of Arborea
- Historical era: Middle Ages
  - Established: 11th century
  - Disestablished: August 14 1420
Preceded by	Succeeded by
Byzantine Empire	Crown of Aragon
- Today part of: Italy

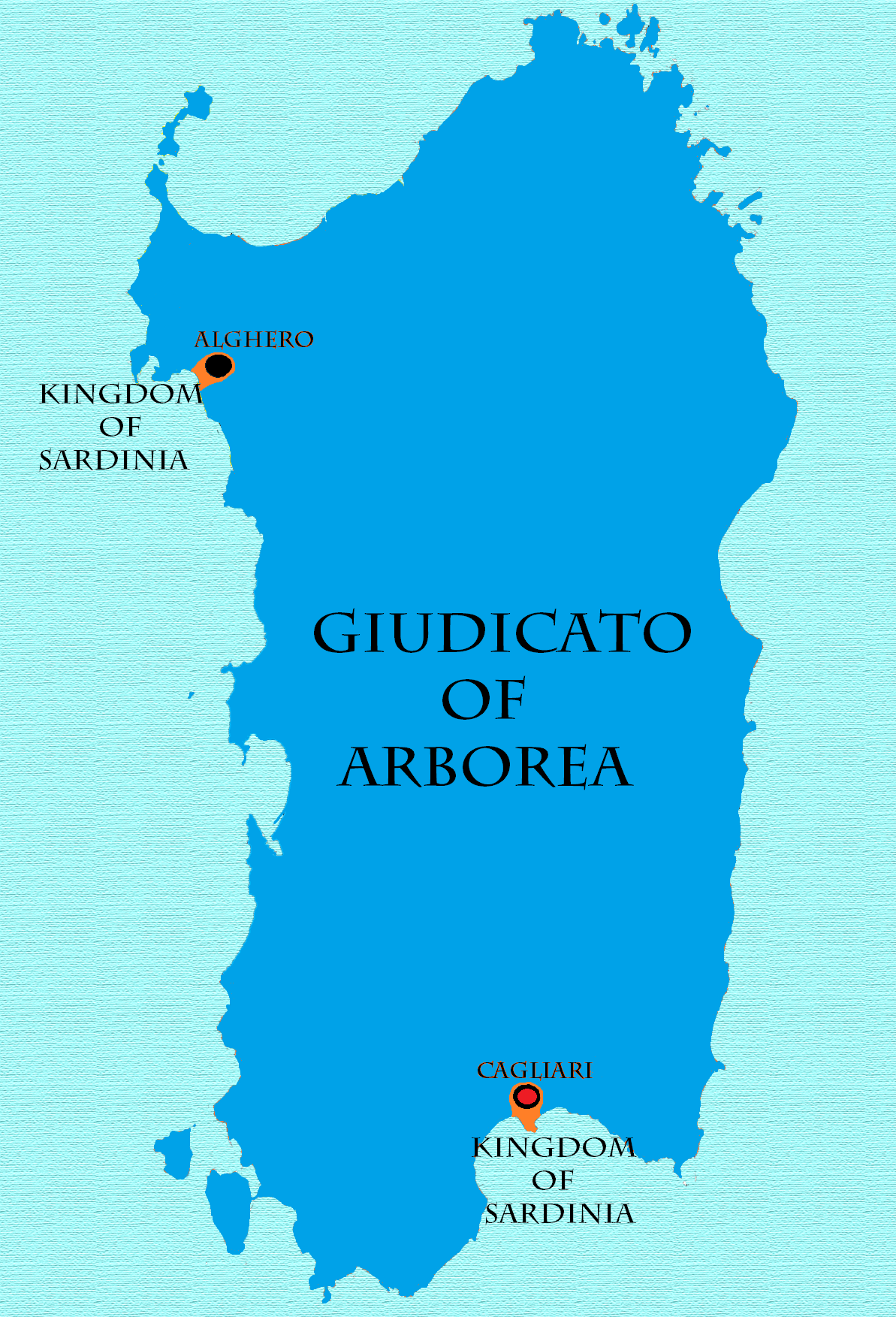
Kingdom of Arborea between 1368–1388 and 1392–1409

The Judicate of Arborea (Sardinian: Judicadu de Arbaree; Italian: Giudicato di Arborea; Latin: Iudicatus Arborensis) or the Kingdom of Arborea (Sardinian: Rennu de Arbaree; Italian: Regno di Arborea; Latin: Regnum Arborensis) was one of the four independent judicates into which the island of Sardinia was divided in the Middle Ages. It occupied the central-west portion of the island, wedged between Logudoro to the north and east, Cagliari to the south and east, and the Mediterranean Sea to the west. To the northeast of Logudoro was Gallura, with which Arborea had far less interaction. Arborea outlasted her neighbours, surviving well into the 15th century. At its greatest territorial extent it occupied the entire island except the cities of Alghero and Cagliari. The earliest known judicial seat was Tharros, though Oristano served as capital for most of its existence.

== Origins ==
Sardinia was an imperial province of the Byzantine Empire until the early 9th century, when the aggressive expansion and relentless piracy of the Arabs and Berbers of North Africa left the central authorities of the Empire unable to effectively defend or consistently govern the island. The local Byzantine magistrates, entitled judikes, meaning "judges", were increasingly left to provide for their own administration and defense. A single and autonomous archontate was established in the island. Later in the 11th century, the single archontate fragmented into 4 judicados, including Arborea. Maintaining the traditional forms and patterns of the imperial bureaucracy, the island's judicatos, originally a type of administrative sub-division, became autonomous states ruled by judikes. By the 11th century, the legal titles to these districts (like the provinces administered by dux ("Duke") and comes ("Count") in mainland Europe) had become hereditary or rotated amongst a few powerful clans.

The first important Judge of Arborea was Marianus I (ruled 1060–1070) of the Thori family. In 1070, his successor, Orzocorre I, moved the capital from the ancient port of Tharros, which was exposed to Arab attacks, to Oristano.

Around the same time, Sardinia began to emerge from obscurity and come into the historian's view. Under the ambitious Pope Gregory VII, then leading a papal reform, Sardinia was integrated into the wider Christendom. By the infusion of Western monasticism and Pisan ecclesiastic rule, she became involved in the conflicts and commerce of Europe.

== Lacon-Gunale dynasty ==
Under Constantine I of the Lacon dynasty, Arborea paid tribute to the papacy and sponsored Camaldolese monks in opposition to the monks of Marseille favoured by rival Cagliari. Constantine paid homage to Pisa for his petty kingdom and his successor was his brother Comita II. When Pope Innocent II divided Sardinia between the sees of Pisa and Genoa in 1133, Arborea fell to the former, but Comita, in the hope of furthering Arborean independence, allied with Genoa during the subsequent civil wars of that decade. In 1145, Comita was excommunicated by Baldwin, Archbishop of Pisa, and the Judicate of Arborea was nominally transferred to Logudoro.

Comita's son and successor, Barison II, put Arborea back on good terms with Pisa. He married into the Aragonese nobility, creating ties to Spain which culminated in Sardinia falling to the Crown of Aragon some centuries later. In 1164, Barison paid the Holy Roman Emperor Frederick Barbarossa to have him crowned King of Sardinia, but the emperor revoked that title the next year, though Barison continued to employ it. He finally left Pisa for Genoa, but his legacy was civil war. His son Peter I and grandson Hugh I finally divided the kingdom by the Treaty of Oristano (1192), but in the end Hugh's line, the House of Cervera (or Bas), succeeded in establishing themselves.

== De Serra-Bas dynasty ==
While Peter II, son of Hugh, has been accused by historians of impoverishing his realm of glory, his son Marianus II expanded it substantially, even briefly ruling over a majority of the island. During the final decades of the 13th century, three other judicados fell into the hands of either Pisa or Genoa or one of their great families, but Arborea remained independent.

Hugh II (ruled 1321 – 1336), great-grandson of Marianus II, headed up a faction which favoured James II of Aragon, who had been promised the island by the pope, as overlord. He supported the Infante Alfonso in his campaign (1323 – 1324) to conquer the island from Pisa. In 1336, Hugh II was succeeded by his son Peter III (died 1345). His brother Marianus IV (ruled 1353 – 1375) was the only Sardinian ruler to be known as "the Great". He was educated at the Crown of Aragon's royal court, but later turned against his cultural allies and led a victorious revolt against the aragonese invaders in the Sardinian–Catalan war. With Marianus IV the great, a period of splendour commenced in the Kingdom of Arborea. Oral traditions were codified and new legislation enacted. Army and tactics were reformed. With the exception of Cagliari, Alghero, and Sassari (then under Brancaleone Doria), Marianus conquered the whole of the island, making Arborea the strongest any of the island's judicates had ever been.

Marianus was succeeded by his son Hugh III, who furthered his father's legislation and died without descendants in 1383. A republic was proclaimed, but the crown was claimed by Eleanor De Serra Bas, elder sister of Hugh III, who was married to Brancaleone Doria. She succeeded to power in 1387. Eleanor was technically regent on behalf of her sons Frederick and, subsequently, Marianus V. She died in 1404 and Marianus in 1407; after the latter's death the succession passed to William III of Narbonne, grandson of Beatrice, Eleanor's sister. He defended the island against the troops of King Martin of Aragon, but Martin I of Sicily (son of Martin of Aragon) vanquished them in the Battle of Sanluri on 30 June 1409. Martin's sudden death made possible a recovery and occupation of Sassari and part of Logudoro as well as reclamation of the title of Judge of Arborea by William. However, all the Arborean castles fell after a renewed Aragonese offensive; Oristano fell in March 1410 without resistance.

Leonard Cubell laid claim to the title of Judge of Arborea, but was compelled in Oristano by Pedro de Torrelles to renounce his claim, after which he was given the Marquisate of Oristano and County of Goceano. In 1420, Alfonso V of Aragon purchased for 100,000 gold florins the rights of the viscounts of Narbonne. Later, the Aragonese governor, Leonardo Alagon, rebelled and was also able to beat the king's troops at Uras in 1470. However, his defeat at the Battle of Macomer in 1478 put a definitive end to the independence of Arborea and of Sardinia as a whole.

== Curadorias ==
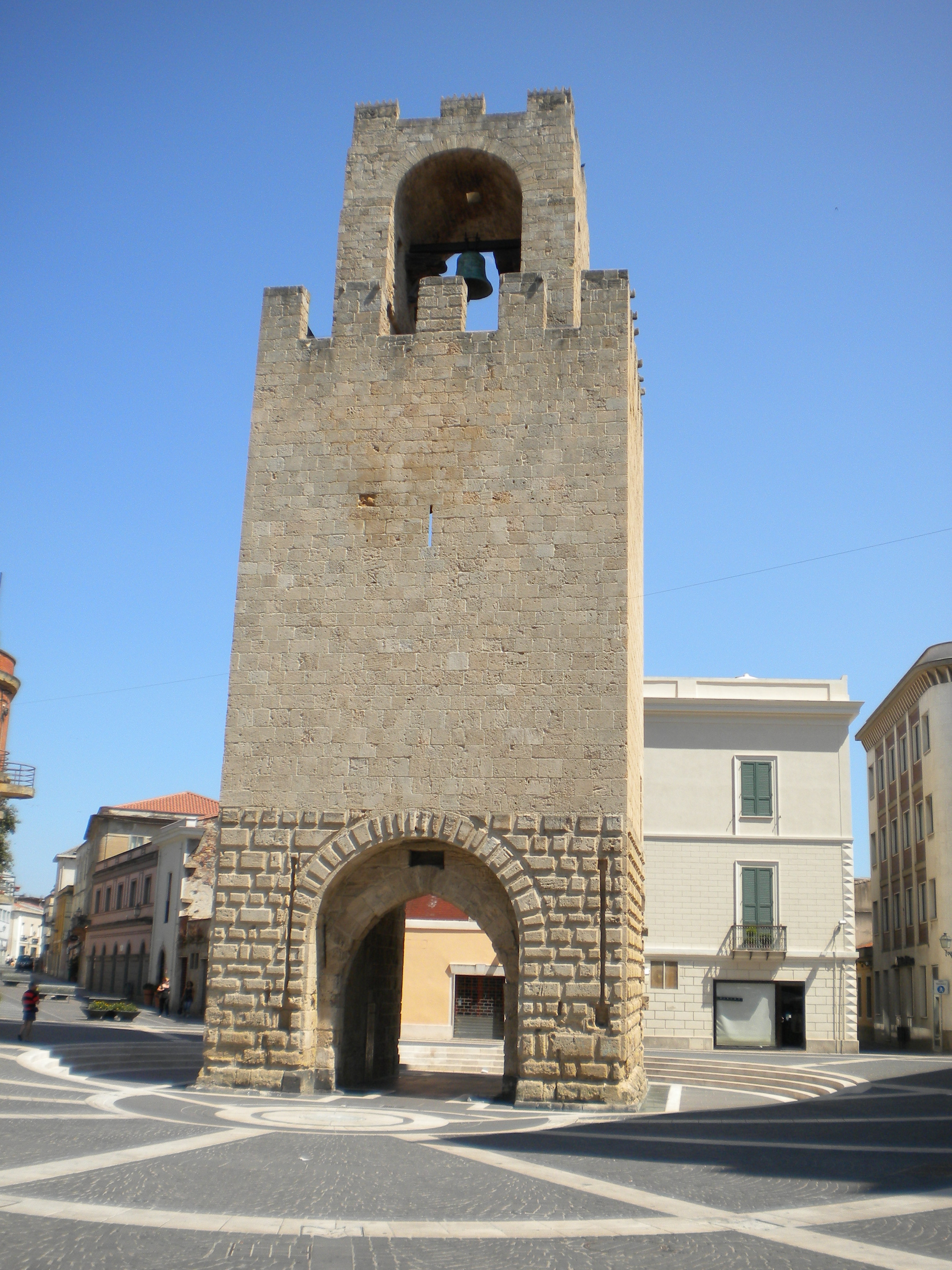
Oristano, Mariano II's tower

Arborea was divided into 13 or, at times, 14 curadorias or partes (sing. curadoria and parte). These were the main administrative regions, governed by curadores (curators) under the judike (judge). The subdivisions of the curadorias were the biddas, the inhabited centres (villages) led by a majore (mayor) that, altogether, probably comprised 100,000 inhabitants. The curadorias were an inheritance from Byzantine tradition and are still recognised today as "historic regions".

The fourteen curadorias of Arborea were:

- Barbagia di Belvì
- Barbagia d'Ollolai
- Barigadu
- Bonorzuli
- Campidano di Cabras
- Campidano di Milis
- Campidano di Simaxis
- Guilcier
- Mandrolisai
- Marmilla
- Montis
- Usellus
- Valenza
- Brabaxiana

== See also ==
- List of kings or judges of Arborea
