= Carta de Logu =

Legal code

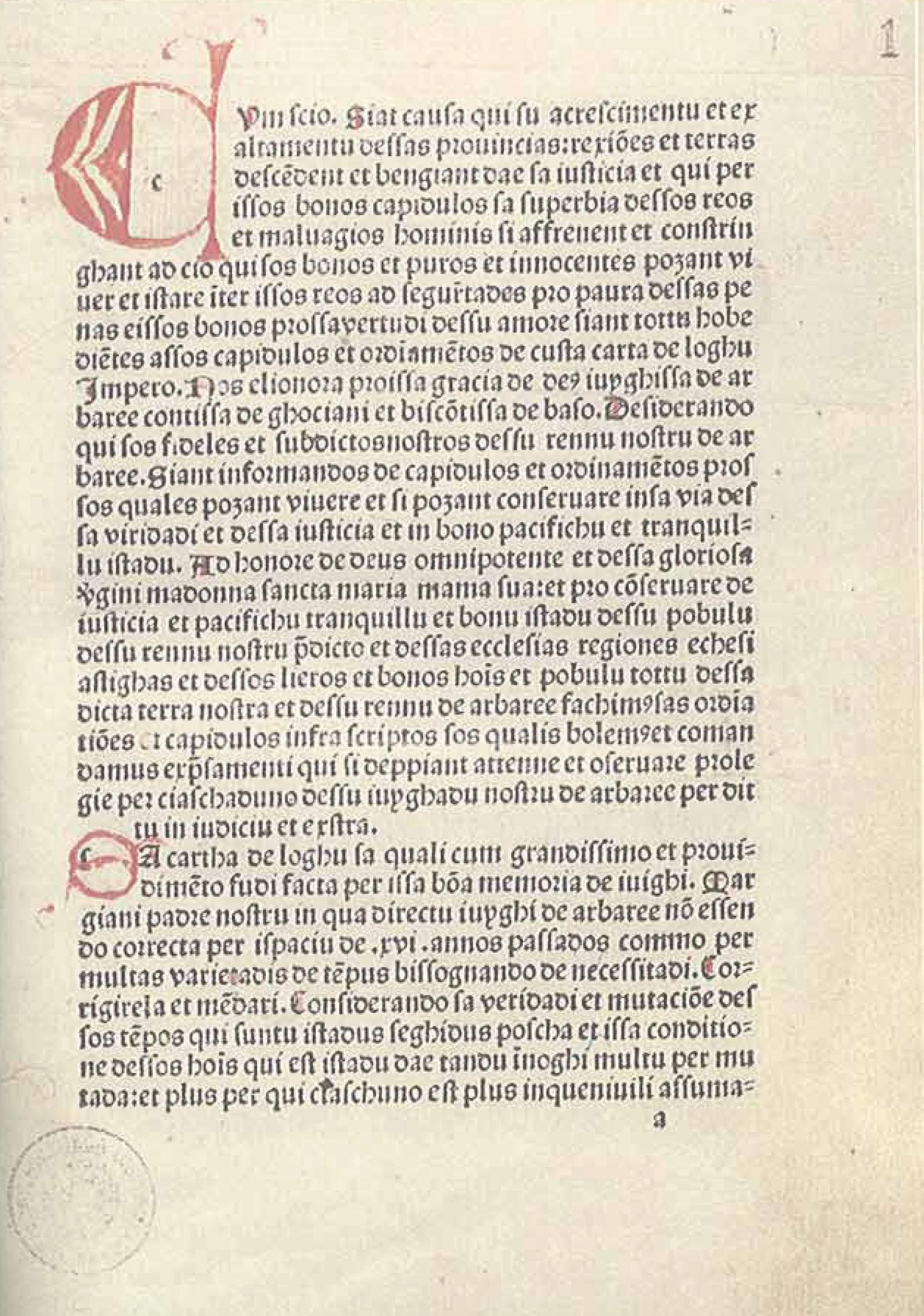
First page of an incunabulum of the Carta de Logu, printed in the 1490s and now in the library of the University of Cagliari

The Carta de Logu was a legal code of the Judicate of Arborea, written in the Sardinian language and promulgated by the juighissa Eleanor of Arborea in 1392. It was in force in Sardinia until it was superseded by the code of King Charles Felix in April 1827.

The Carta was a work of great importance in Sardinian history and in European Juridic history as a whole. It was an organic, coherent, and systematic work of legislation encompassing the civil and penal law. The history of the drafting of the Carta is unknown, but the Carta itself provides an excellent glimpse into the ethnological and linguistic situation of late medieval Sardinia.

In the Carta there is the modernizing of certain norms and the juridical wisdom that contains elements of the Roman-canonical tradition, the Byzantine one, the Bolognese jurisprudence and the thought of the glossators of the Catalan court culture, but above all the local juridical elaboration of the Sardinian customs made by Sardinian municipal law.

One notable provision of the Code is that it gave daughters and sons the same inheritance rights. As well, it also declared that rape could be recompensed through marriage only if the woman who was raped agreed to marry her rapist, and even if she did the Code declared that the rapist still had to either pay a large fine to the Senate or have his foot cut off (his choice). If she did not agree to marry him, he had to give her a dowry that suited her social status, so that she could marry someone else, and he still had to either pay a large fine to the Senate or have his foot cut off (his choice). As well, these punishments were not affected by whether or not the woman in question was betrothed.

The Code also caused Eleanor of Arborea to be remembered as one of the first lawmakers to set up the condition of reciprocity when dealing with foreigners, as well as the crime of misfeasance.

== Bibliography ==
- Birocchi, I. and Mattone A. La carta de logu d'Arborea nella storia del diritto medievale e moderno. Laterza: 2004.
