= 1409 in Italy =

An incomplete list of events which occurred in Italy in AD 1409:

- Battle of Sanluri on the island of Sardinia
- Council of Pisa elects Antipope Alexander V.
- Ladislaus of Naples invades Tuscany
- Theodore II puts an end to French domination of Genoa

== Births ==
- Alessandro Sforza (d.1473), Condottiero
- Bernardo Rossellino (d.1464), Renaissance sculptor

== Deaths ==
- Alberico da Barbiano
- Martin I of Sicily
