= Eleanor of Arborea =

Judge of Arborea from 1383 to 1404

Elianora de Arbarèe
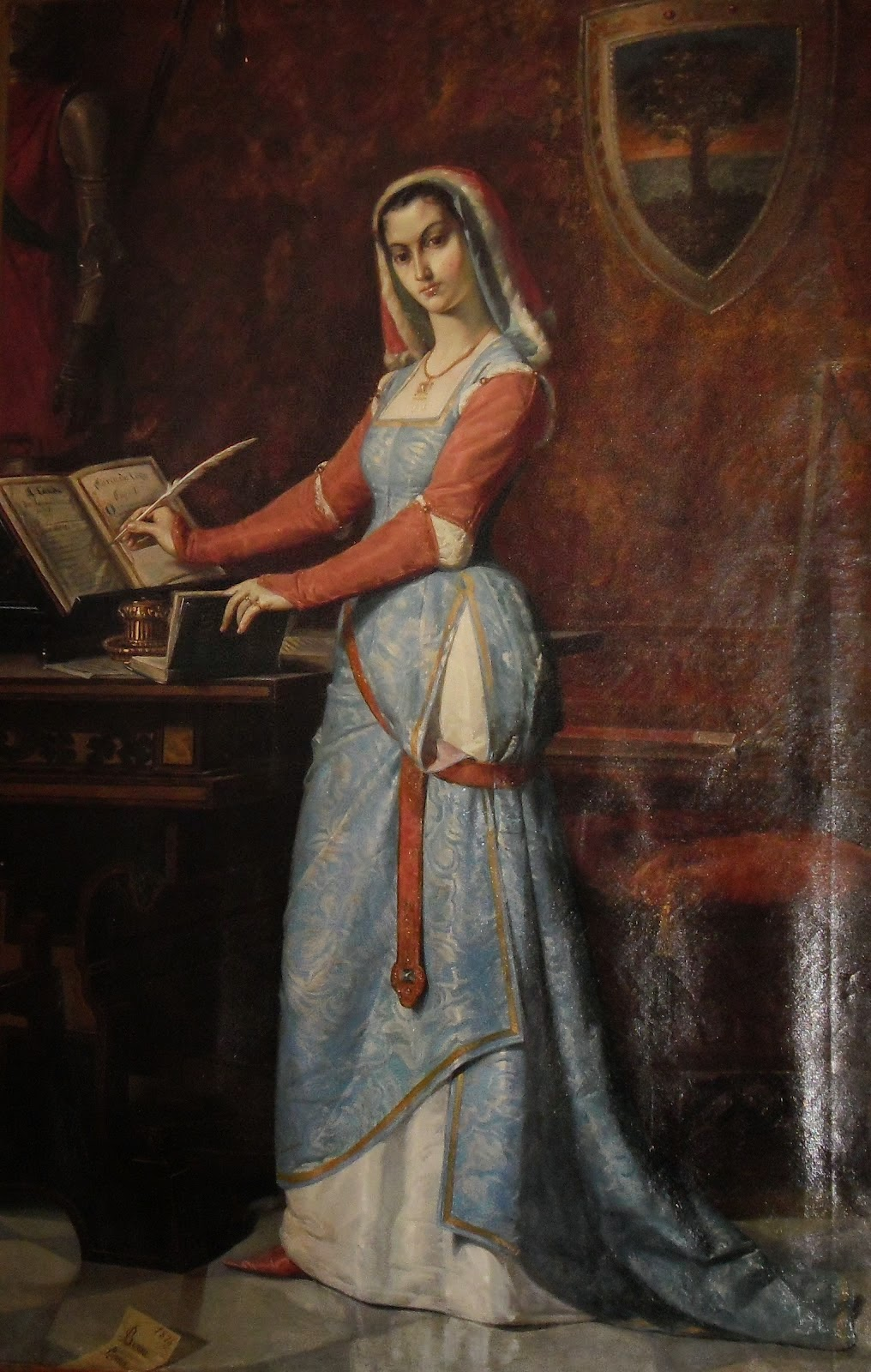
- Portrait by Antonio Benini (19th Century)

Judge/Queen of Arborea
- Reign: 1383 – 2/23 June 1404
- Predecessor: Hugh III
- Successor: Marianus V
- Co-monarch: Frederick (1383–1387); Marianus V (1387–1404)
- Born: 1347; Molins de Rei, Crown of Aragon
- Died: 23 June 1404 (aged 56–57)
- Spouse: Brancaleone Doria
- Issue: Frederick, King of Arborea; Marianus V, King of Arborea
Names
- Elianora De Serra Bas
- House: House of Cervera (Serra-Bas branch)
- Father: Marianus IV, King of Arborea
- Mother: Timbora of Roccaberti

Eleanor of Arborea or Elianora de Serra Bas (Note: Sardinian: Elianora de Arbarée / Elianora De Serra Bas; Italian: Eleonora d'Arborea / Eleonora De Serra Bas) (1347 – June 1404) was one of the most powerful and important, and one of the last, judges of the Judicate of Arborea in Sardinia, and Sardinia's most famous heroine. She is also known for updating of the Carta de Logu, promulgated by her father, Marianus IV, and revisited by her brother Hugh III.

== Early life ==
Eleanor was born in Molins de Rei (Catalonia, Crown of Aragon), around 1347, to Marianus IV de Serra Bas, judge of Arborea, and Timbors of Rocabertí, a Catalan noble. Sister to Hugh and Beatrix of Arborea, she lived her first years in Oristano, at the castle of Goceano. When Peter III of Arborea died without an heir, the Corona de Logu of the Judgedom (an assembly of notables, prelates, city and village officials) elected Eleanor's father Marianus IV, Peter's brother, who ruled the Judgedom between 1347 and 1376.

== Dynastic relations ==
Before 1376, Eleanor married the forty-year-old Brancaleone Doria, from an influential Genoan house. The marriage was designated to be part of the designed alliance between the houses of Arborea and Doria, the last of which already held many possessions on Sardinia in an anti-Aragonese function. After the marriage, she resided in Castelgenovese (modern-day Castelsardo), where she gave birth to her sons Fredrick and Marianus.

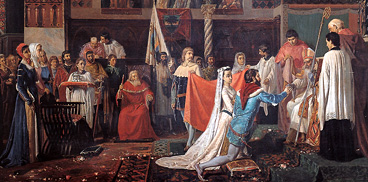
Painting of Eleanor's and Brancaleone's marriage

It now seems certain that in 1382 Eleanor gave a loan of 4,000 gold florins to Nicolò Guarco, doge of the Republic of Genoa, and that the latter for his part undertook to repay the sum within ten years; otherwise, he would have paid double. In addition the condition was signed that, if in the meantime Fredrick (Eleonor's eldest son) had reached puberty, the daughter of Doge Bianchina would have had to marry him and, in the event that this marriage could not be celebrated (due to death or other fortuitous event), the act would have become null.

A similar loan to a powerful family of Genoa, and this clause of the contract, indicate a dynastic design by Eleonor who, by granting this credit, together kept the prestige of her lineage high and recognized the importance of the interests of the Ligurians. In addition, she laid the foundations for an alliance that would allow her to have recourse to logistical and connection resources (through the powerful Dorian fleet) in most of the Mediterranean ports. In essence, she entered the game of European politics on an equal footing.

Coat of arms of the Judicate of Arborea

The murders in 1383 of Marianus IV's son Eleanor's brother Hugh III and his daughter Benedetta immediately posed problems of succession. This sudden and violent death could have various reasons and could benefit various interests. The claimants to the Arborean throne were the children of the late judge's sisters, Beatrix and Eleanor. But Beatrix had died in 1377 and her heir was too far away. Eleanor, closer and more present than her, worked hard to ensure the election by the Corona de Logu of her very young son. Recent studies, based on a letter from Aimery VI of Narbonne, husband of Beatrix, to King Peter IV of Aragon, in which he claimed the Arborean throne for his son William II, immediately after the death of Hugh III), ascertain that Eleanor was the third child of Marianus and Timbora.

The external reasons for the murder were those of the Aragonese and the enemies of Arborea; the internal ones could be identified in the discontent of the classes of owners and merchants, in reaction to the authoritarian attitude of Hugh III and for the vexatious contributions (necessary to keep the German, Provençal and Burgundian mercenaries).

== Succession to the judgedom of Arborea ==
In this climate of crisis and discontent, with Aragon already openly willing to conquer the entire island, in 1383 Eleanor wrote a report to the king on the conditions of Sardinia and asked him to recognize her son Fredrick as the legitimate successor of Hugh. She then sent her husband Brancaleone to deal directly with the sovereign. At the same time she sent a letter to the queen, asking her to intercede with her spouse in favor of her son so that she could end the disorder that reigned on the island.

Eleanor intended to reunite in the hands of her son those two thirds of Sardinia that Hugh, before his death, had occupied. This design made the aragonese sovereign suspicious, who did not consider it convenient to have such a powerful family in his kingdom, especially since there was no direct male heir to Hugh, those possessions, iuxta morem italicum, should have been forfeited by the tax authorities. Brancaleone was detained under the pretext of having him return to Sardinia as soon as a fleet was set up, but he had actually become a real hostage (and instrument of pressure against the rebellious judgess).

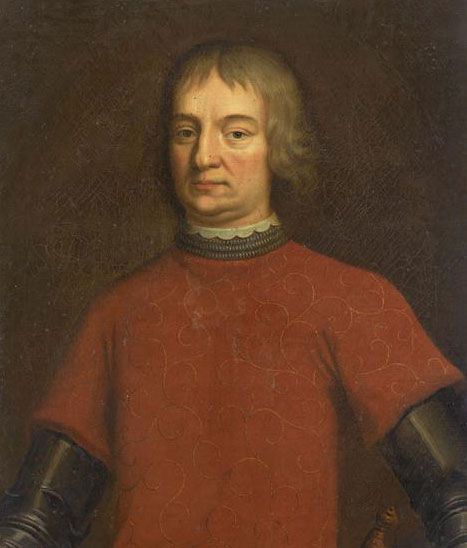
Aymeri VI de Narbonne

Eleanor did not lose heart and confirmed her war policy: she took action and as soon as she returned to Oristano, she punished the conspirators and proclaimed herself Judgess of Arborea according to the provisions dictated by her grandfather Hugh II, for which women could succeed to the throne in the absence of male heirs.

In practice, the elective praxis was the opposite of the royal fiefdom and was at variance with the Aragonese political line. The Arboreas instead recalled their ancient autonomy of early medieval origin and the right to exercise full sovereignty in their territories, a situation often contested or not recognized by the crown of Aragon.

Eleonora was very worried because even her brother-in-law Viscount Aimeriy VI de Narbonne (1341–1388), widower of her sister Beatrix, had worked with King Peter IV of Aragon to convince him to recognize his son William I as judge of Arborea (1388–1397).

The reason that the viscount Aimeriy brought forward consisted in the decisive fact that his wife, Beatrix, was the second child of Marianus IV and Timbora di Roccaberti, after Hugh III and therefore before Eleanor. Her succession therefore belonged to the Narbonne-de Serra Bas branch, as mentioned and documented above: the fact that she gave her the name of Timbora's mother, Beatrix, is also further proof.

Finally, the Aragonese monarch decided that his nephew Fredrick, eldest son of Eleanor (who would hold the regency) and Brancaleone Doria (whom he imprisoned), would take over from the murdered sovereign of Arborea.

== Political life ==
With regard to politics, practices and guidelines of government, the court, therefore, linked directly to the experience of her father, definitively abandoning the authoritarian policy of her brother Hugh III, guaranteed the defense of the sovereignty and territorial boundaries of the judgedom and he carried out a work of reorganization and definitive arrangement of the local legal systems and institutions, revising the Carta de Logu promulgated by her father at the time.

Eleanor never showed the absolutist vision of the lord at the top of an oligarchy and far from the reasons of the people, but rather that of those who believe they have their own legitimacy to reign among the people. For political reasons, the same rights to succession were contested, given the pretext that the Arborea were "bastard" sons, but the dynastic reasons seemed to have less value for her than popular legitimacy and, if anything, would have been valid for that part of the territories received by the king in a personal capacity and not for those who were part of the proper judgedom.

The interests of the Judgess were tied to those of the State with a Gordian knot and it was always her who brought back the law and order to put a stop to the spread of Sardinian violence during the war. The rules, the laws guaranteed peace, that is, in the order in time, for the future.

The control of power was a vital point for Eleanor, the choice between life and death. After having managed to complete her father's project of reuniting almost the whole island under her scepter of ruling judgess, keeping the Aragonese troops in check and driving back to the edge of the island (in some fortresses on the coast), she saw her project collapse following an unpredictable unknown fate: the plague, which practically handed over Sardinia to the Aragonese without fighting. In recent years, Eleanor took a little apart from her active politics, leaving it to her husband and her young son Marianus V, who had succeeded his brother Fredrick.

== Death ==
According to tradition, the Judgess died around 1404, perhaps of plague, in an unspecified place: even on her grave one can only make assumptions.

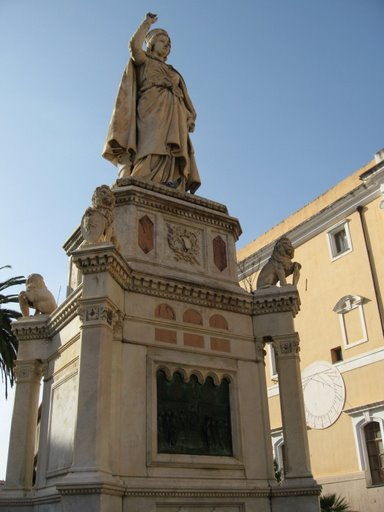
Statue of Eleanor in Oristano. She holds the Carta de Logu, which she enacted, in her hand.

== The Carta de Logu ==
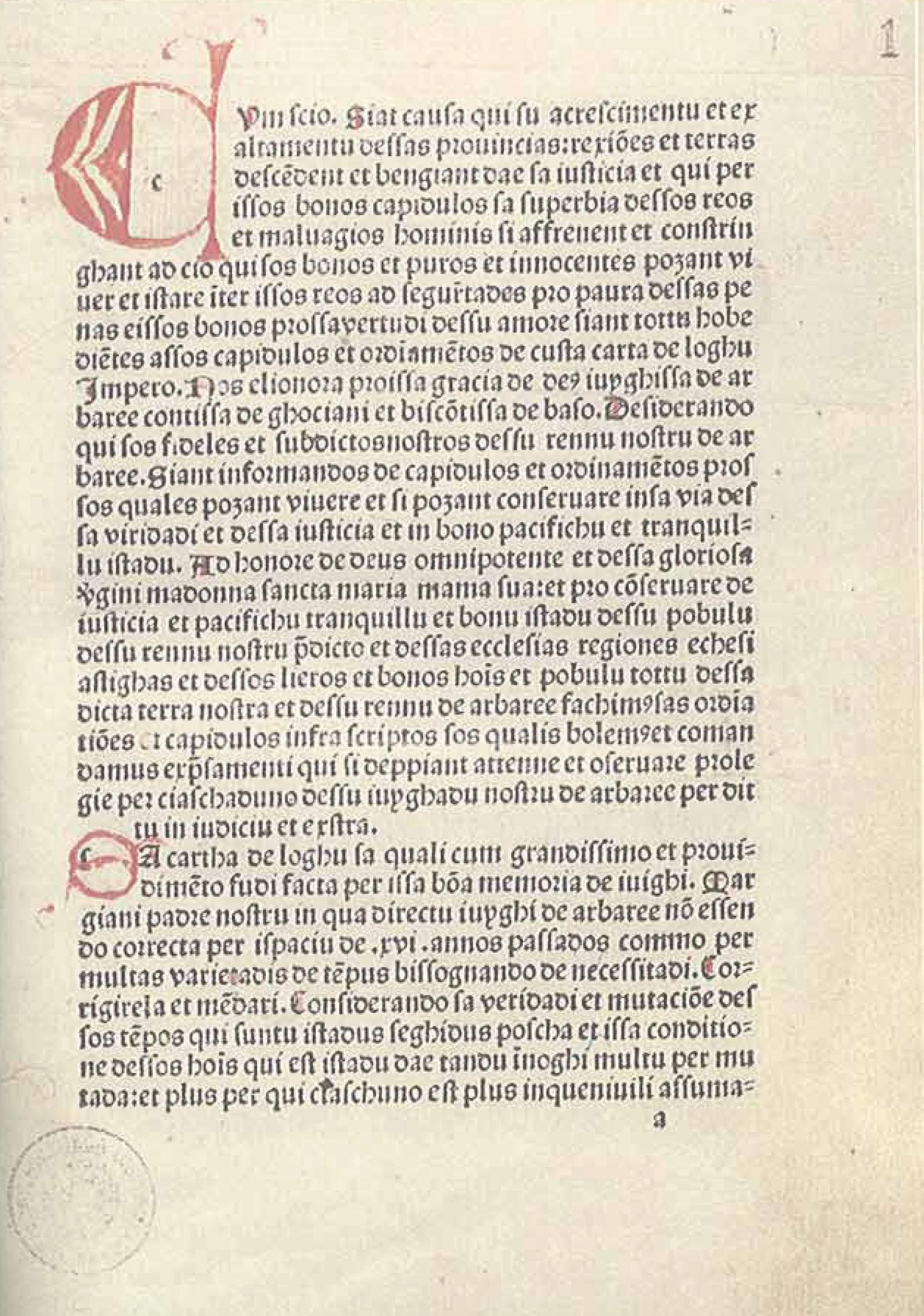
1st page of the Carta de Logu, which Eleanor enacted.

One of the most notable actions carried out by Eleanor during her judgedom was the updating of the Carta de Logu, promulgated at the time by her father and revised by her brother, with which she gave a stable and lasting arrangement to the legal systems and institutions of the judgedom. In the Charter there is the openness to modernity of certain norms and the juridical wisdom that contains elements of the Roman-canonical tradition, of the Byzantine one, of Bolognese jurisprudence and of the thought of the glossators of the Catalan curial culture itself, above all of the local juridical elaboration of the Sardinian customs carried out by Sardinian municipal law.

The judges of Arborea, in reacting to the attempts of Aragonese fiefdom, issued a new juridical discipline in their territories, which were nevertheless in a state of perennial political turmoil. This legislation stood out as the component of a broader policy aimed at the development of the arborean judgedom and was clearly more advanced than the other european legal and administrative legislations of the time.

Eleanor demonstrated with her regency that she wanted to get out of the Middle Ages by also focusing on the liberation of the serfs, the lieros, and that she wanted to use those made up of her fellow citizens in her own national-type struggle, in addition to the mercenary troops.

This is the period in which the concept of territorial Sardinia is about to change into a statal one, with the island divided into various sovereign political entities. The four judgedoms of Calari/Saint Illa, Torres/Logudoro, Gallura and Arborea are complex singular institutional constructions. Rather than from pre-existing elements, they seem to originate from the "ability of the Sardinians, free from foreign domination to self-manage" through complex forms such as those of the curatorial system, the assembly administration of the coronas de logu.

The royal judicial prerogatives, which are not found in any continental territory of Byzantine or barbarian formation, have such a connotation as to remove the importance of the matrix of origin and make it an original government organization. Like all central states, the Arborea always had to fight not to succumb to the pressures of neighboring states.

== Tributes ==
The scholar Francesco Cesare Casula identified, in the church of San Gavino Monreale, a few miles from the castle of Monreale in Sardara, the high reliefs representing the only contemporary portraits of Eleanor, Marianus IV, Ugone III and Brancaleone Doria.

There is a statue of Eleanor in the Piazza Eleonora in Oristano.

== See also ==
- Brancaleone Doria
- Giudicato of Arborea
- Marianus IV of Arborea
- Eleonora's falcon, bird species named after Eleanor of Arborea

== Notes ==
Preceded by Hugh III	Judge of Arborea; 1383 – 1404	Succeeded by Marianus V
