= Marianus V of Arborea =

Judge of Arborea from 1387 to 1407

Marianus V

Judge/King of Arborea
- Reign: 1387–1407
- Predecessor: Eleanor and Frederick
- Successor: William II (de jure); Leonard Cubello (de facto)
- Co-monarch: Eleanor (1387–1404)
- Born: 1378
- Died: 1407 (aged 28–29)
Names
- Marianus De Serra Bas
- House: Doria
- Father: Brancaleone Doria
- Mother: Eleanor of Arborea

Marianus V (1378 or 1379 – 1407) was the Judge of Arborea from 1387 until his death. His surname was Doria, but since he belonged to the ruling house of Arborea he is often dynastically called Bas-Serra, or Doria-Bas. Younger brother and successor of Frederick, he was a minor upon his succession and was under the tutelage of his mother Eleanor.

He was born at Castel Genovese (modern Castelsardo) between 1378 and 1379 to Eleanor and Brancaleone Doria, a Genoese nobleman. In 1383, he was proclaimed judge along with his brother, Frederick of Arborea. In 1387, his brother died under Aragonese captivity and Marianus became sole judge at a time when the Judicate of Arborea was at war with the Crown of Aragon. On 24 January 1388, Eleanor signed a pact with Aragon which brought peace and safeguarded Marianus' rule.

On 16 August 1391, Marianus accompanied his father at the occupation of Sassari and Osilo. Marianus was 14 years old in 1392 when his mother promulgated the Carta de Logu and he was declared of age. He immediately reaffirmed the treaty with Aragon, but the real power at that time lay with Brancaleone. Eleanor died in 1404. He died of bubonic plague three years later without heirs, presenting a succession crisis.

Preceded by Frederick	Judge of Arborea; 1387–1407 with Eleanor until 1404	Succeeded by William
