= Frederick of Arborea =

Frederick (1377–1387) was the Judge of Arborea from 1383 until his death. His surname was Doria, but since he belonged to the ruling house of Arborea he is often dynastically called Bas-Serra, or Doria-Bas. Nephew and successor of Hugh III, he was a minor upon his succession and was under the tutelage of his mother Eleanor.

== Biography ==
He was born at Castel Genovese (modern Castelsardo) in 1377 to Eleanor and Brancaleone Doria, a Genoese nobleman. In 1382, Eleanor was residing in Genoa, where she made a pact with the Doge Nicolò Guarco that loaned him 4,000 florins and promised Frederick in marriage to the doge's daughter Bianchina. If the girl died before the marriage could take place, the agreement would be null. Frederick never reached puberty and the accord never came into effect.

Upon Hugh's death in a republican uprising, the barons of the realm gathered in a parliament and elected Frederick judge. Eleanor immediately set to work defeating the rebels and securing her son's realm. No sooner, the Giudicato fell into another bitter war with the Crown of Aragon, who laid claim to the island. During the war, Frederick was captured together with his father by its monarch Peter IV of Aragon, and they both were imprisoned in Cagliari, first in the tower of San Pancrazio and then in that of Elefante.

Frederick died in captivity in 1387, the same year as Peter. He was succeeded by his younger brother Marianus V, also under the regency of Eleanor.

Preceded by Hugh III	Judge of Arborea; 1383–1387 with Eleanor	Succeeded by Marianus V
