= Battle of Sanluri =

Battle in Europe

Coordinates: 39.5667°N 8.9000°E

- Part of Aragonese conquest of Sardinia
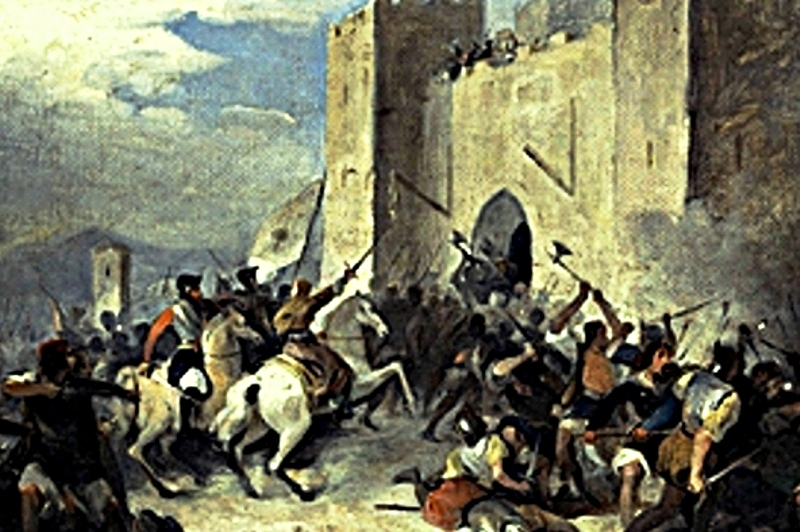
- Depiction of the battle by Giovanni Marghinotti.
Date	30 June 1409
Location	Sanluri, Sardinia
Result	Aragonese-Sicilian victory

Belligerents
Kingdom of Sicily; Crown of Aragon	Judicate of Arborea; Republic of Genoa

Commanders and leaders
Martin I of Sicily	William III of Narbonne

The Battle of Sanluri was fought on 30 June 1409 between the armies of the Sardinian Judicate of Arborea and the Aragonese-Sicilian army led by the King Martin I of Sicily.

The location was the fortified village of Sanluri, in Sardinia. The Arborean army was led by Judge William III of Narbonne, and Martin commanded in person the Aragonese army. The Sardinian army was composed mostly of mercenaries, including the renowned Genoese crossbowmen and other units from France and northern Italy.

There are a few details about the battle. The Aragonese were less numerous though much better trained, and managed to divide the Arborean army into two parts which were then destroyed separately. A contingent under William survived taking refuge in the castle of Monreale, in the near village of Sardara. Other Sardinian troops were captured in Sanluri, and much of the local Sardinian population was slaughtered in a plain which has taken the name of s'occidroxiu ("the slaughter") ever since.

Martin died a few days later in Cagliari, allegedly by malaria transmitted by a Sanlurese mistress. The battle did not directly conclude the war, but it paved the way to the Aragonese conquest of the Arborean Judicate, which fell the following year.

== See also ==
- Sardinian–Aragonese war
