= Aimery VI of Narbonne =

14th century French noble

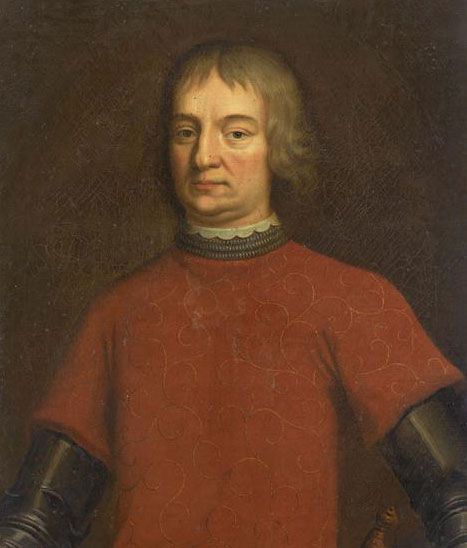
18th century portrait of Aymeri VI

Arms of Aimery VI, Viscount of Narbonne

Aimery VI (died 1388), Viscount of Narbonne and Lord of Puisserguier, was a 14th-century French noble. He was an Admiral of France from 1369 to 1373.
