= Crown of the Realm =

The Crown of the Realm (Sardinian: Corona de Logu) was a political institution in Sardinia that acted as legislature during Sardinia's Judicates era.

It was made up of the majorales (or "wise men") of each region, including the curadores and the majores (or "aldermen") as well as the local píscamos (who acted more like high prelates), and existed to advise the judiches. The majorales were usually either relatives of the judiche or belonged to reliable local families. In essence, it was more-or-less identical to the witenagemot of Anglo-Saxon England in both its composition of officials and its purpose. The Crown nominated the "Deemster King" Judiche, and attributed the supreme power, maintaining the powers to ratify the acts and the laws which regarded the whole realm.

The Supreme Magistrate of the Crown was the "Deemster King" Judiche, although they could be substituted for a curadore or a majore if need be. The moots were in the capital (or wherever the judiche lived).

The Sardinian word logu literally means "place", but when capitalised it refers to a judicadu. It is derived from Latin locus (originally "stlocus" in Old Latin) from Proto-Indo-European *stel- ("to place", "to locate").
