= Hugh III of Arborea =

Judge of Arborea from 1376 to 1383

Hugh III

Judge/King of Arborea
- Reign: 1375–1383
- Predecessor: Marianus IV
- Successor: Eleanor and Frederick
- Born: 1337; Molins de Rei, Crown of Aragon
- Died: 3 March 1383 (aged 45–46); Oristano, Sardinia
- Spouse: A woman from the Vico family
- Issue: Benedetta
Names
- Hugh De Serra Bas
- House: Cervera (Serra Bas branch)
- Father: Marianus IV, King of Arborea
- Mother: Timbora of Roccaberti

Hugh III (died 3 March 1383) was the eldest son and successor of Marianus IV of Arborea and Timbor of Rocabertí. He succeeded in 1376 as Judge of Arborea and Count of Goceano. In most ways he continued and augmented the policies of his father. He has been praised as a legislator who led a saggio e moderato governo: "wise and moderate government."

In 1363, he married a daughter of John III of Viterbo, of the Da Vico family, but she died in 1369. They had a daughter named Benedetta, who in 1373 was asked in marriage by the Louis I, Duke of Anjou, second son of King Charles V of France, without success.

Hugh participated in his father's last military campaign against Pere de Luna, the Catalan general, commanding one of the battles which ambushed him in a pincer movement at Oristano in 1365. As judge, he continued to oppose the pretensions of Peter IV of Aragon and the Catalans and warred against them.

He made enemies with the nobles, who tried to incite the poor to rebel. On 3 March 1383, Hugh and his daughter—and heiress—were assassinated at Oristano during a popular revolt. The rebels declared a "Republic" and made the law (which Hugh and his father had done so much to codify, expand, and improve) the sovereignty in Arborea. Hugh's successor was his nephew Frederick, under the regency of his sister Eleanor, who pacified the rebels and reinstated judicial government.

== Sources ==
- Nowé, Laura Sannia. Dai "lumi" dalla patria Italiana: Cultura letteraria sarda. Mucchi Editore: Modena, 1996.
- Onnis, Omar; Mureddu, Manuelle (2019). Illustres. Vita, morte e miracoli di quaranta personalità sarde (in Italian). Sestu: Domus de Janas. ISBN 978-88-97084-90-7. OCLC 1124656644.

Preceded by Marianus IV	Judge of Arborea; 1376–1383	Succeeded by Frederick with Eleanor
