= William II of Narbonne =

French noble (1397–1424)

The coat of arms of William.

William II was Viscount of Narbonne (1397–1424) and the last Judge of Arborea (1407–1420).

He was the grandson of Beatrice, youngest daughter of Marianus IV of Arborea and Timbra de Rocabertí, and Aimery VI of Narbonne (married 1363). When Marianus V, the youngest son of Beatrice' elder sister Eleanor, died in 1407, Arborea experienced a succession crisis. The late Beatrice had a claim to the judgeship which was picked up by her grandson, son of William I.

The real judge from 1407 was Leonardo Cubello, great nephew of Hugh II of Arborea. On 6 October 1408, Martin I of Sicily disembarked at Cagliari with a strong army. On 8 December, William also reached Cagliari. He was crowned "King of Arborea, Count of Goceano, and Viscount of Bas" at Oristano on 13 January 1409.

The two forces, of Martin and of William, met at the Battle of Sanluri. The Arborean troops of William, including many Genoese crossbowmen, broke into two battles. The left battle was destroyed in a location called occidroxiu (the slaughterhouse). The right battle was broken into two part, the first was being chased to Sanluri and eventually was routed there, and the other one was forced by William to take refuge in the castle of Monreale, in the nearby village of Sardara, and continued the resistant. On 4 July, the Villa di Chiesa surrendered to Giovanni di Sena, which dealt a crippling blow to Arborea even though the Sicilian king had died on 25 July in Cagliari. William returned to France to seek aid, leaving Leonardo Cubello in charge in his absence. Leonardo successfully defended Oristano.

William returned to Sardinia in Spring 1410. He reorganised his territories with his capital at Sassari. With the help of Nicolò Doria, he recaptured Longosardo on 9 August. He tried to take Oristano and Alghero, which were defended by Peter Torrelles, who died of malaria in 1411. On 5 and 6 May 1412, he entered Alghero, but was driven off by the citizenry.

With the chances of victory turned out to be grim, William reluctantly surrendered and sold Arborea to Alfonso V on 17 August 1420 for 100,000 gold florins. He was killed in 1424 in the Battle of Verneuil.

== Sources ==
- Molins, Pol Junyent (2021). "Old and New Enemies: The Military Scenario of Alfonso the Magnanimous (1420-1432)". In Bergqvist, Kim; Jensen, Kurt Villads; Lappin, Anthony John (eds.). War, Diplomacy and Peacemaking in Medieval Iberia. Cambridge Scholars Publishing.

Preceded by Marianus V	Judge of Arborea; 1407 – 1420	sold to Crown of Aragon
