= 1304 =

1304 in various calendars
- Gregorian calendar: 1304; MCCCIV
- Ab urbe condita: 2057
- Armenian calendar: 753; ԹՎ ՉԾԳ
- Assyrian calendar: 6054
- Balinese saka calendar: 1225–1226
- Bengali calendar: 710–711
- Berber calendar: 2254
- English Regnal year: 32 Edw. 1 – 33 Edw. 1
- Buddhist calendar: 1848
- Burmese calendar: 666
- Byzantine calendar: 6812–6813
- Chinese calendar: 癸卯年 (Water Rabbit); 4001 or 3794 — to — 甲辰年 (Wood Dragon); 4002 or 3795
- Coptic calendar: 1020–1021
- Discordian calendar: 2470
- Ethiopian calendar: 1296–1297
- Hebrew calendar: 5064–5065
- Hindu calendars
- Vikram Samvat: 1360–1361
- Shaka Samvat: 1225–1226
- Kali Yuga: 4404–4405
- Holocene calendar: 11304
- Igbo calendar: 304–305
- Iranian calendar: 682–683
- Islamic calendar: 703–704
- Japanese calendar: Kagen 2 (嘉元２年)
- Javanese calendar: 1215–1216
- Julian calendar: 1304; MCCCIV
- Korean calendar: 3637
- Minguo calendar: 608 before ROC 民前608年
- Nanakshahi calendar: −164
- Thai solar calendar: 1846–1847
- Tibetan calendar: ཆུ་མོ་ཡོས་ལོ་ (female Water-Hare); 1430 or 1049 or 277 — to — ཤིང་ཕོ་འབྲུག་ལོ་ (male Wood-Dragon); 1431 or 1050 or 278

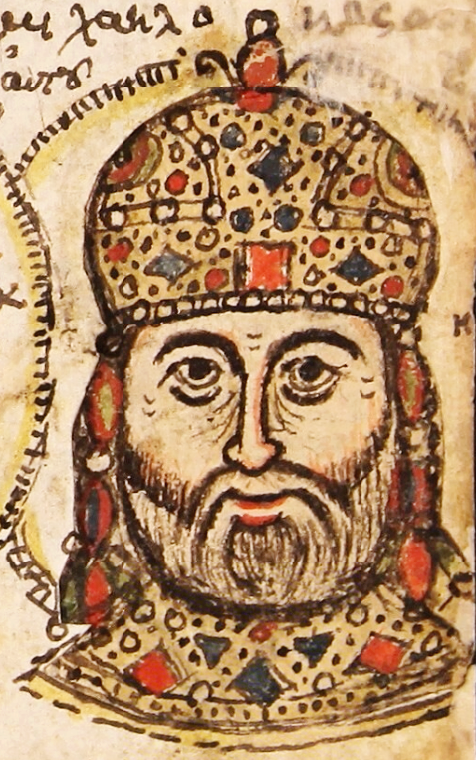
Portrait of Michael IX (1277–1320)

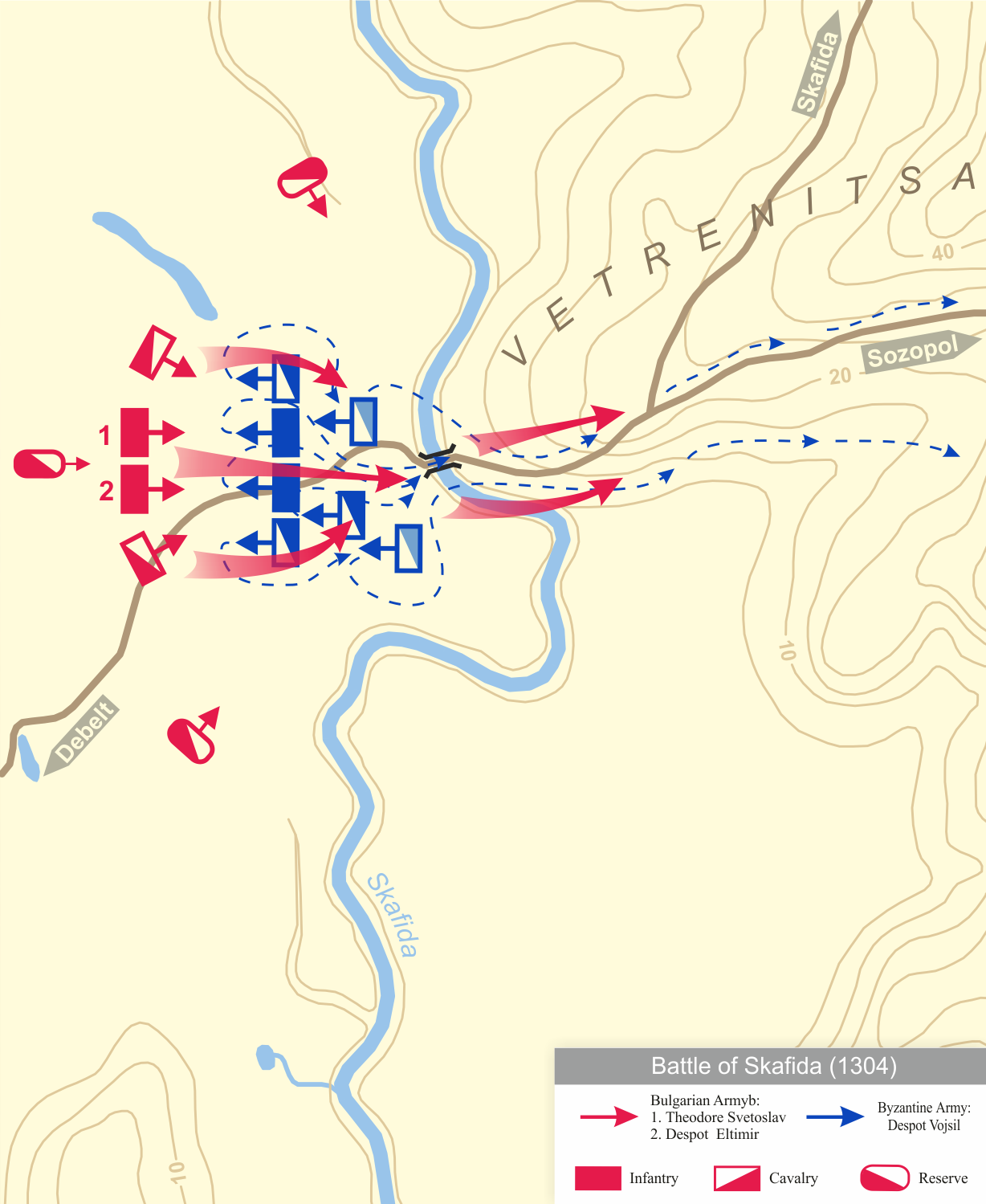
Map of the Battle of Skafida (1304)

Year 1304 (MCCCIV) was a leap year starting on Wednesday of the Julian calendar.

== Events ==
=== January – March ===
- January 11 – Messengers from King Edward of England arrive at Kinclaven Castle in Scotland to discuss peace with Scottish noble John Comyn.
- January 18 – In France, King Philip the Fair issues a mandate at Toulouse to halt the threat of a civil war, declaring that "For the good of our realm... we expressly forbid and most strictly prohibit wars, battles, homicides, the burning of towns or houses, assaults or attacks on peasants or those who plow, or doing anything similar to our vassals and subjects, regardless of status or condition, in any place, or in any part of the realm," and adds that "the rash transgressors of these statutes and inhibitions ought to be punished as disturbers of the peace, regardless of contrary custom, or rather corruption allegedly followed in any part of the said realm." The action comes after Philip's meeting with Franciscan friar Bernard Délicieux concerning the Dominican Inquisition, but the King stops short of halting the Inquisition entirely despite Delicieux's claim that there had not been a single heretic among all the Albigensians for many years.
- January 31 – Cardinal Nicolò Albertini de Prato is dispatched by Pope Benedict XI as the papal legate to oversee negotiation of peace between Tuscany, Romagna and the Marca Trevigiana.
- February 9 – War of Scottish Independence: Scottish nobles led by Robert the Bruce and John Comyn ("John the Red"), negotiate a peace treaty with King Edward I of England ("Edward Longshanks"). His terms are accepted, and the Scots submit to English rule. In return, they are granted life and liberty under their old laws and freedom from the forfeiture of their lands. A few prominent nobles are singled out for temporary banishment – among them John de Soules, guardian of Scotland, who is exiled to France. No terms are offered to William Wallace, Edward's most wanted enemy, who remains defiantly at large despite every effort of Edward to capture him.
- February 20 – Battle of Happrew: Scottish rebels led by William Wallace and Simon Fraser fight guerilla warfare against King Edward I of England. They defend themselves against a vanguard of English knights at Peebles, in the Scottish Borders. During the skirmish, the Scots are defeated and routed. Wallace and Fraser narrowly escape being captured.
- March 17 – Cardinal Albertini, the papal legate and peacemaker, enters Florence and is granted special powers by the government to facilitate his mission.
- March 23 – John I of Arborea, nicknamed "Chiano" and the ruler of western Sardinia as Judge of Arborea dies. He is succeeded by his sons Marianus III and Andrew

=== April – June ===
- April 1 – Count Albert I of Gorizia dies and is succeeded by his son Henry III.
- May 11 – Mahmud Ghazan, Mongol ruler of the Ilkhanate in the Middle East, dies and is succeeded by his brother Öljaitü Qaghan.
- June 5 – Abu Said Uthman I, Zenata Berber ruler of Tlemcen, dies and is succeeded by his son Abu Zayyan I.

=== July – September ===
- July 7 – Pope Benedict XI dies after an 8-month pontificate in Perugia.
- July 17 – A papal conclave, with 15 of the 19 living Roman Catholic cardinals, assembles at Perugia to elect a successor to Pope Benedict XI, who had died 10 days earlier. The conclave will be deadlocked for almost a year until Clement V receives the necessary two-thirds majority on June 5, 1305.
- July 24 – Siege of Stirling Castle: King Edward I of England captures the Scottish rebel stronghold at Stirling. The castle is for four months bombarded by twelve siege engines. During the siege, Edward orders his engineer, Master James of St. George, to build a massive engine called the Warwolf. Eventually, William Oliphant and his garrison surrender.
- July 27 – Andrey III Aleksandorovich, Russian nobleman and Grand Prince of Vladimir dies and is succeeded by his uncle Mikhail of Tver.
- August 8 – Treaty of Torrellas: The 18-year-old King Ferdinand IV of Castile signs a peace with King James II of Aragon ("James the Just"). In the terms, James agrees to restore the Kingdom of Murcia to Castile, except for Alicante, Elche, Orihuela, and lands north of the Segura River. In return for extensive patrimony, Prince Alfonso de la Cerda renounces his claim to the Castilian throne, ending a conflict that has disturbed the tranquility of the realm for nearly 30 years.
- August 11 – Battle of Zierikzee: A French-Hollandic fleet (some 50 galleys) supported by Genoese ships led by Admiral Rainier I defeats the Flemish ships near Zierikzee. During the battle, the Flemish commander Guy of Namur is captured, and his fleet (which consists of Flemish, English, Hanseatic, Spanish and Swedish ships) is annihilated.
- August 18 – Battle of Mons-en-Pévèle: French forces (some 13,000 men) led by King Philip IV of France ("Philip the Fair") defeat a Flemish army at Mons-en-Pévèle. During the battle, the Flemish, led by William of Jülich "the Younger") are forced to retreat to Lille. William is killed, and the French lose the Oriflamme ("Golden Flame"), the battle standard of Philip.
- August
  - Flemish forces under John II, Duke of Brabant ("the Peaceful") and Guy of Dampierre occupy Zeeland and Holland. In response, John II, Count of Holland, count of Holland, recovers the Zeeland and Holland, and restores his authority, but dies on August 22.
  - Sultan Alauddin Khalji orders a second invasion of Gujarat, which results in the annexation of the Kingdom of Vaghela into the Delhi Sultanate.
- September 2 – Brinolfo Algotsson, the Swedish Catholic Bishop of Skara is rewarded for his financial assistance in rebuilding Norway's Stavanger Cathedral, as a Norwegian ship arrives at Skara. He is presented a holy relic, what is purported to be a thorn from the crown of thorns worn by Jesus Christ at the Crucifixion. In a solemn profession led by Algotsson, the thorn is transported to the Skara Cathedral.
- September 22 – Thomas of Corbridge, England's powerful Archbishop of York, dies after a little more than four years in office. The office is vacant for several months, and leads to the resignation of Lord Chancellor William Greenfield to become the new Bishop.

=== October – December ===
- October 5 – Treaty of Treviso: After a dispute over salt works, the Italian commune of Padua and Venice sign a peace treaty, ending the Salt War. Venice establishes a salt monopoly and sells salt rights to merchants.
- October 24 – Ottoman-Turkish forces led by Sultan Osman I conquer the ancient city of Ephesus from the Byzantine Empire, massacring and deporting its native population.
- November 12 – King Edward I summons the English Parliament for the first time in more than two years.
- December 4 – William Greenfield, Lord Chancellor of England, is elected Archbishop of York by the church leaders in the diocese, then sets off for Rome to receive the consecration of the office by the Pope.
- December 29 – William de Hamilton is nominated Lord Chancellor of England, the highest office at the time for a member of Parliament, by King Edward I. He takes office on January 16.
- December – Roger de Flor, Italian nobleman and adventurer, settles with the Catalan Company in Gallipoli and other towns in the southern part of Thrace and visits Constantinople to demand payment for his forces. He lives at the expense of the local population and uses the city as a base for his marauding raids in the surrounding area.

=== By place ===
==== Byzantine Empire ====
- Battle of Skafida: Emperor Michael IX Palaiologos sends a Byzantine expeditionary force (some 10,000 men) to halt the expansion of the Bulgarians in Thrace. The two armies meet near Sozopol on the Bulgarian Black Sea Coast. During the battle, the Bulgarian army led by Tsar Theodore Svetoslav is defeated and routed. The Byzantines, infatuated with the chase of the retreating enemy, crowd on a bridge – which possibly is sabotaged, and break down. The Bulgarians capture many Byzantine soldiers and some nobles are held for ransom. Svetoslav secures his territorial gains and stabilizes himself as the sole ruler of the Bulgarian Empire (until 1322).
- The Byzantines lose the island of Chios, in the Aegean Sea, to the Genoese under Admiral Benedetto I Zaccaria. He establishes an autonomous lordship and justifies the act to the Byzantine court as necessary to prevent the island from being captured by Turkish pirates. Benedetto is granted the island as a fief for a period of 10 years.

==== Asia ====
- Ambassadors from the Mongol rulers of Central Asia and the Yuan dynasty announce to Toqta Khan, Mongol ruler of the Golden Horde, their general peace proposal. Toqta accepts the supremacy of Emperor Temür Khan and all yams (postal relays) and commercial networks across the Mongol khanates reopen. In response, Toqta solidifies his rule upon the Russian princes, who pledge allegiance to him at an assembly in Pereyaslavl.

=== By topic ===
==== Architecture ====
- The construction of Ypres Cloth Hall, in Ypres (modern Belgium), is completed.

== Births ==
- January 9 – Hōjō Takatoki, Japanese nobleman and regent (d. 1333)
- February 16 – Tugh Temür (or Wenzong), Mongol emperor (d. 1332)
- February 24 – Ibn Battuta, Moroccan scholar and explorer (d. 1369)
- May 2 – Margaret Mortimer, Anglo-Norman noblewoman (d. 1337)
- April 9 – Venturino of Bergamo, Italian Dominican friar and preacher (d. 1346)
- June 6 – Francesco Albergotti, Italian nobleman and jurist (d. 1376)
- July 20 – Francesco Petrarca, Italian historian and poet (d. 1374)
- October 4 – John Beauchamp, English peer and knight (d. 1343)
- October 17
  - Eleanor de Bohun, English noblewoman (d. 1363)
  - James Butler, Irish nobleman and knight (d. 1338)
- Engelbert III, German archbishop (House of La Marck) (d. 1368)
- Gerard II de Lisle, English nobleman, peer and knight (d. 1360)
- Ibn al-Shatir, Syrian astronomer, engineer and writer (d. 1375)
- Joan of Valois, French noblewoman and princess (d. 1363)
- John of Aragon, Aragonese archbishop and patriarch (d. 1334)
- Lodewijk Heyligen, Flemish monk and music theorist (d. 1361)
- Magnus I ("Magnus the Pious"), German nobleman and knight (d. 1369)
- Marcus of Viterbo, Italian cardinal and papal legate (d. 1369)
- Marie of Luxemburg, queen of France and Navarre (d. 1324)
- Walram of Jülich, Dutch nobleman and archbishop (d. 1349)
- Walter VI, French nobleman, knight and constable (d. 1356)
- William de Clinton, English nobleman and admiral (d. 1354)

== Deaths ==
- January 13 – Ichijō Uchisane, Japanese nobleman (b. 1276)
- February 14 – Guy of Ibelin, Outremer nobleman (House of Ibelin)
- March 6 – Fujiwara no Kimiko, Japanese empress consort (b. 1232)
- March 7 – Bartolomeo I della Scala, Italian nobleman and knight
- March 23 – John I ("Chiano"), Sardinian ruler (Judge of Arborea)
- March 26 – Wigbold von Holte, German archbishop and diplomat
- April 1 – Albert I, Austrian nobleman, knight and co-ruler (b. 1240)
- April 11 – Maud de Lacy, Norman noblewoman (suo jure) (b. 1230)
- April 27 – Pedro Armengol, Spanish nobleman and priest (b. 1238)
- May 11 – Ghazan Khan, Mongol ruler of the Ilkhanate (b. 1271)
- May 23 – Jehan de Lescurel, French composer-poet and writer
- June 1 – Giovanni Pelingotto, Italian Third order Franciscan and hermit (b. 1240)
- June 5 – Abu Said Uthman I, Zenata Berber ruler of Tlemcen
- July 7 – Benedict XI, pope of the Catholic Church (b. 1240)
- July 17 – Edmund Mortimer, English nobleman (b. 1251)
- July 27 – Andrey III, Russian nobleman and grand prince of Vladimir
- August 10 – Martin of Dacia, Danish theologian (b. 1240)
- August 16 – John III, Dutch nobleman and knight (b. 1249)
- August 17 – Go-Fukakusa, Japanese emperor (b. 1243)
- August 18 – William of Jülich, Flemish nobleman (b. 1275)
- August 22 – John II, Dutch nobleman and knight (b. 1247)
- September 22 – Thomas of Corbridge, English archbishop
- September 27 – John de Warenne, English nobleman (b. 1231)
- September 28 – Elisabeth of Kalisz, Polish noblewoman (b. 1259)
- September 29 – Agnes of Brandenburg, Danish queen (b. 1257)
- December 5 – John of Pontoise, English archdeacon and bishop
- December 23 – Matilda of Habsburg, German co-ruler (b. 1253)
- Fernando Rodríguez de Castro, Spanish nobleman and knight
- Henry I, German nobleman and knight (House of Schaumburg)
- Henry II of Rodez, French nobleman and troubadour (b. 1236)
- João Afonso Telo, Portuguese nobleman, knight and diplomat
- Peter of Auvergne, French philosopher, theologian and writer
- Robert de Brus, Scoto-Norman nobleman and knight (b. 1243)
- Wang Yun, Chinese official, politician, poet and writer (b. 1228)
