= Ponç V of Empúries =

Catalan military nobleman and composer

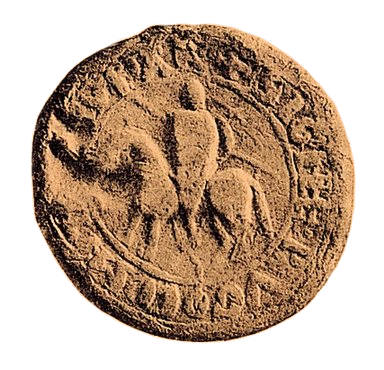
A seal of Ponç Hug IV

Ponç V or Ponç Hug IV (Spanish: Ponce V or Ponce Hugo IV, Occitan: Pons Uc) (c.1264 – 1313) was the Count of Empúries from 1277 until his death and viscount of Bas from 1285 to 1291. He was the son and successor of Hug V and Sibila de Palau.

His mother, widowed, sold the viscounty of Bas to Peter III of Aragon in 1280. In 1282 Ponç Hug participated in the Aragonese Crusade against the crusaders, on the side of Peter III. In 1285 the viscounty of Bas devolved to Ponç in reward for his services in 1282 and Peter also compensated him with the rights over Fernando and Castellfollit de Riubregós.

Ponç served as admiral of the fleet to James I of Sicily and was in Sicily in 1291, when he exchanged Bas with his brother Huguet, also in Sicily that year, on the condition that it would devolve to Ponç's descendants if Huguet had none. Ponç received Castellfollit, Montros, and Montagut in the exchange. He returned with James later that year after he inherited Aragon and Catalonia, but Huguet stayed behind in Siciy.

When James signed the Treaty of Anagni with the French and the Papacy, thus putting an end to the War of the Vespers, in 1295, the people of Sicily under James' younger brother Frederick III opposed him. When Frederick heard that James was preparing to go to war with him, he sent a messenger, Mountainer Pérez de Sosa, to Catalonia in an effort to stir up the barons and cities against James in 1298. Mountainer carried with him an Occitan poem, Ges per guerra no.m chal aver consir, intended as a communication with his supporters in Catalonia. This communiqué seems to have had in mind Ponç Hug as a recipient, for the count penned a response (under the title con d'Emppuria), A l'onrat rei Frederic terz vai dir, in which he praised Frederick's tact and diplomacy, but told him bluntly that he would not abandon his sovereign. This poetic transaction is usually dated to January–March, Spring, or August 1296, but Gerónimo Zurita in the seventeenth century specifically dated the embassy of Mountainer to 1298.

In the subsequent war, Ponç and his vassals fought with James' galleys at the Battle of Cape Orlando, while Huguet his brother fought among the ships of Frederick. Many subsequent scholars have assumed that Ponç had gone over to the side of his brother, but this is unlikely.

Ponç later turned against James and rose in revolt, driving his functionaries out of Empúries. But the king proved to powerful for his most powerful baron and Ponç was ruined and forced to submit in 1306.

== Family ==
Ponç married (1281) the Marquesa de Cabrera, uniting Cabrera to Empúries. Between 1282 and 1313, Fra Romeu Sabruguera translated much of the Bible from Old French into 11,000 verses in Old Catalan. He dedicated the work (the "Biblia rimada") to the Countess Marquesa, whose interest was primarily in battles, of which he bragged there would be many. He had excluded the prophetic books in favour of the Books of Kings and the Maccabees.

The couple had three children:

- Hug (assassinated 1309), named heir
- Ponç VI (c.1290–1322), successor
- Blancaflor (died 1313)

== Sources ==
- Corominas, John. "The Old Catalan Rhymed Legends of the Seville Bible". Hispanic Review 27, 3 (1959): 361–83
- Courcelles, Dominique De. "Les bibles en Catalogne à la fin du Moyen Âge ou l'occultation de la lettre sacrée" Revue de l'histoire des religions 218, 1 (2001): 65–82.
- Hillgarth, J. N. The Spanish Kingdoms, 1250–1516, vol. 1. Oxford: Clarendon Press, 1976.
- Riquer, Martín de. Los trovadores: historia literaria y textos, 3 vols. Barcelona: Planeta, 1975.
- Simo Rodríguez, María Isabel. "Un conflicto entre Ponce Hugo VI, conde de Ampurias, y los Venecianos," Historia, instituciones, documentos 4 (1977): 583–96.
