= Aragonese conquest of Sardinia =

1323 military campaign

Coordinates: 39.5667°N 8.9000°E

Conquest of Sardinia
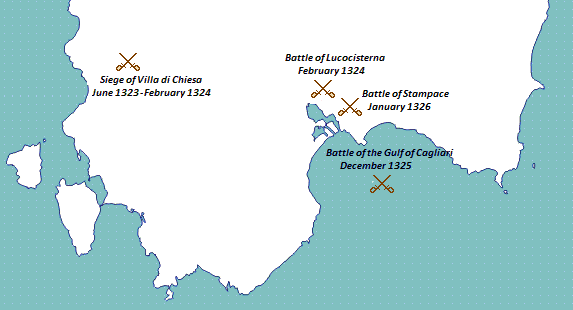
- Major battles of the campaign
Date	1323–1326
Location	Sardinia
Result	Aragonese victory
Territorial changes	Conquest of Pisan Sardinia by the Crown of Aragon.; Annexation of Sassari.; Creation of the Kingdom of Sardinia.

Belligerents
Crown of Aragon; Judicate of Arborea	Republic of Pisa; Republic of Genoa: House of Doria

Commanders and leaders
Alfonso IV of Aragon; Hugh II of Arborea	Manfredi della Gherardesca; Gaspare Doria

Strength
Unknown	Unknown

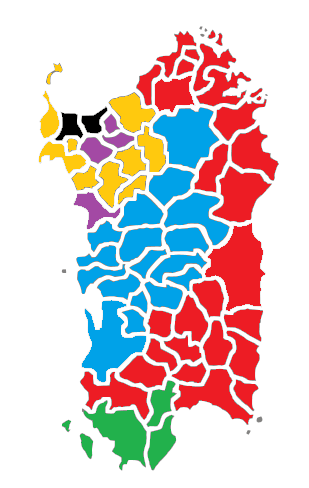
Political situation in Sardinia in the early 14th century, just before the Aragonese invasion: Red, Republic of Pisa Yellow, Doria Black, Comune of Sassari Green, della Gherardesca gherardiani Purple, Malaspina Blue, Judicate of Arborea

The Aragonese conquest of Sardinia took place between 1323 and 1326. The island of Sardinia was at the time subject to the influence of the Republic of Pisa, the Pisan della Gherardesca family, Genoa and of the Genoese families of Doria and the Malaspina; the only native political entity survived was the Judicate of Arborea, allied with the Crown of Aragon. The financial difficulties due to the wars in Sicily (until 1295), the conflict with the Crown of Castile in the land of Murcia and Alicante (1296–1304) and the failed attempt to conquer Almeria (1309) explain the delay of James II of Aragon in bringing the conquest of Sardinia, enfeoffed to him by Pope Boniface VIII in 1297.

The possession of the island of Sardinia was crucial for the Crown of Aragon. Sardinia was abundant of natural resources like silver and salt and had a thriving agro-pastoral economy; also its geographical location ensured more control over the western Mediterranean and the island itself was an indispensable basis for the creation of so-called ruta de las islas (route of the islands) that allowed to halve the time of sailing to reach the rich markets of the Eastern Mediterranean.

== Chronology ==
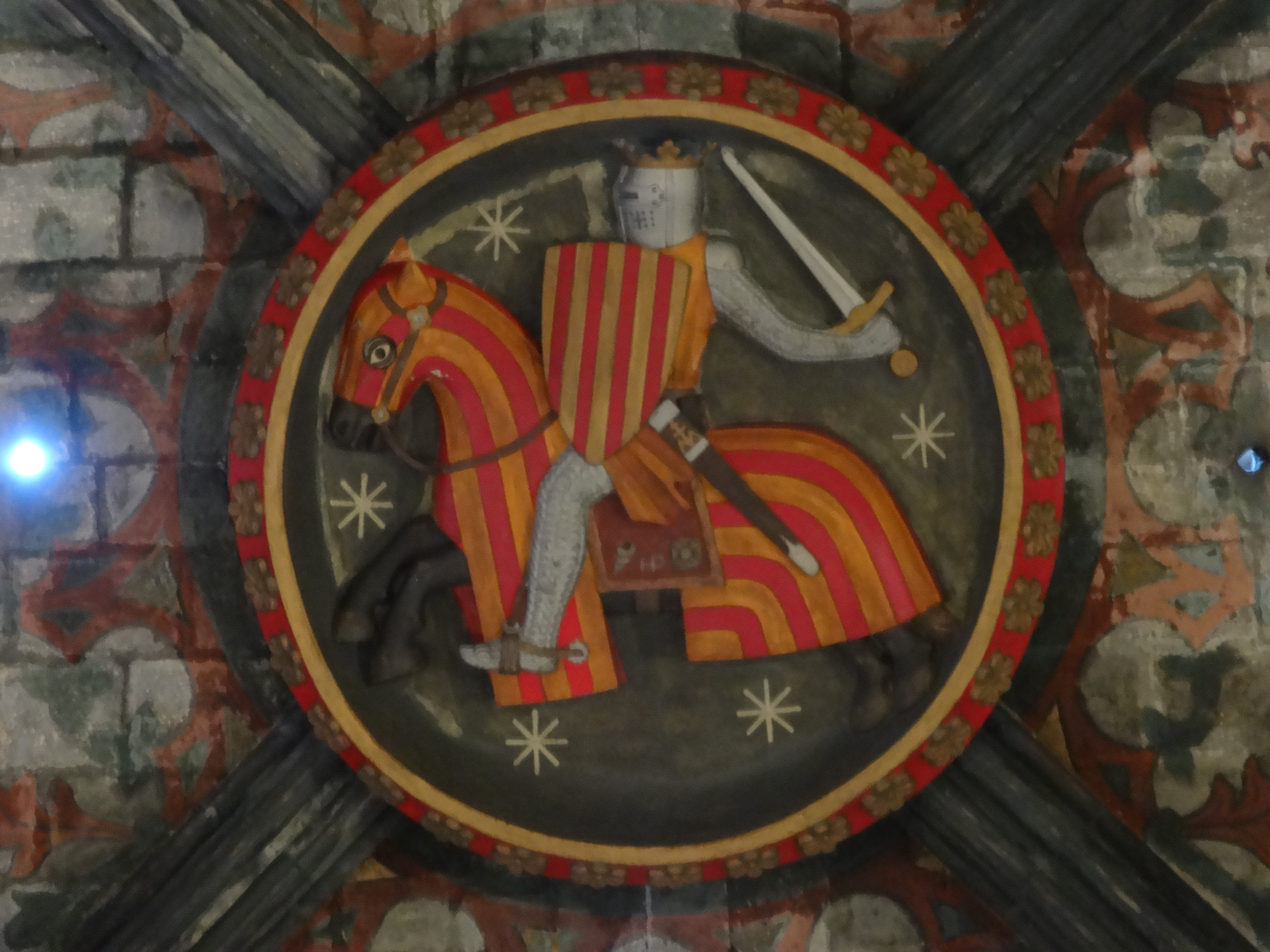
Alfonso of Aragon, Santa Maria del Mar, Barcelona

- In 1321 the Cort of the Principality of Catalonia, held in Girona, accepted the offer by Sancho of Majorca, the King of Majorca, of twenty galleys, two hundred horses, and a large number of labourers who would be necessary for an undertaking such as the conquest of Sardinia to be successful; other support came from the Kingdom of Valencia and the Kingdom of Aragon.
- On 11 April 1323, Hugh II of Arborea, became vassal of James II in exchange for maintenance of the dynastic rights over his Judicate, opened hostilities against the Pisans, defeating them between Villanovaforru and Sanluri.
- On 15 May 1323, a fleet of three galleys with 200 knights and 2,000 men-at-arms, under the command of Guerau de Rocabertí and his nephew Dalmau de Rocabertí, departed from Barcelona in aid of the judge of Arborea, taking position near Quartu Sant'Elena, not far from the pisan walled city of Castel di Castro, today Cagliari. At the same time the vanguard of the army was meanwhile gathering in Catalonia.
- On 31 May, after years of preparation a powerful fleet of 300 ships, under the command of Admiral Francesc Carròs i de Cruïlles (Francis Carroz), departed Port Fangós, near Tortosa, in Tarragona. It was composed of 20 cogs, including the flagship St. Eulalia, 53 galleys, 24 sailing ships and other special vessels (uxer) for the transport of horses and supplies. On the way to Sardinia, the fleet landed for four days in Mahón, on the island of Menorca, and then resumed his sailing toward Cape San Marco, in the Gulf of Oristano.
- On 13 June, acting upon the advice of Hugh II, the Aragonese fleet made landfall at Palmas, in Sulcis, thereby creating the first bridgehead on the island.
- On 28 June, at the request of the Judge of Arborea the Aragonese, under the guidance of the infant Alfonso, began the siege of Villa di Chiesa, today Iglesias. Villa di Chiesa was an important mining town founded by Count Ugolino della Gherardesca decades before and now under the control of the Republic of Pisa.
- During the month of October, a Pisan fleet of 33 galleys led by the vice admiral Francesco Zaccio made an incursion into the waters of Canyelles, Portoscuso, burned two Catalan ships and then retired.
- On 7 February 1324, the city of Villa di Chiesa surrendered, after holding out for seven months, due to starvation.
- Little is known about the Aragonese military campaign in the interior of the island; Raimondo de Sentmenat wrote to the king who, at the command of a small contingent of Iberian riders and servicemen and 50 knights and 200 infantrymen from Arborea, in December 1323 marched from Goceano into the Baronie, taking 33 villages including perhaps Orosei and Dorgali and some castles. However, he was then forced to contend with a Pisan contingent, who had recaptured two villages. Francesc Carròs, Ramon de Peralta and Bernat de Cabrera with the fleet were sent to Pisa. Along the way they took the castle of Medusa, near Lotzorai, and attacked Terranova, but they did not reach their final goal due to bad weather and then decided to return toward Cagliari.
- On 13 February, a week after the conquest of Villa di Chiesa, the Aragonese reached Castel di Castro taking position east of the castle, on the hill of Bonaria. In order to relieve their army trapped in the city the Republic of Pisa sent a fleet of 40 galleys, 12 uxer, 60 other ships from Piombino to the command of the Count Manfredi della Gherardesca. The fleet sailed from Porto Pisano, the fleet made a stop at Terranova, today Olbia, where the fleet took onboard 200 horsemen from the Pisan possessions in Gallura along with other forces.
- On 25 February, as the Pisan fleet approached Castel di Cagliari they were intercepted by the galleys of the Crown Aragon who tried to do battle but the Pisani refused confrontation. After a negotiation, the Aragonese conceded to the pisan fleet to land in freedom near Capoterra.
- On 29 February the Aragonese and the Pisan armies engaged in a pitched battle near the present day centre of Elmas. The Battle of Lucocisterna ended with a hard-fought victory of the Aragonese army. On the same day the Pisan fleet was defeated in the waters near Cagliari by the Admiral Francesc Carròs. Many Pisans were captured while seeking refuge on ships.
- After the defeat in Lucocisterna the Pisans were forced to accept the surrender and give to the Aragonese their territorial possessions in Sardinia which included the former Judicates of Calari and Gallura. The republic of Pisa maintained, for the moment, the control of Castel of Castro and the surrounding villages of Villanova and Stampace.
- During the month of September, the Doria of Sardinia tried to occupy Sassari, ex-Confederate comune of the Republic of Genoa passed to the Aragonese in 1323, and Pisa, in alliance with Genoa, declared again war to the Crown of Aragon.
- During the month of November, a Pisan-Genoese fleet gathered in the port of Savona, before later sailing to Sardinia.
- On 29 December, the Aragonese fleet, under the command of Francesc Carròs, defeated the Pisan-Genoese fleet commanded by Gaspare Doria in a naval battle in the Gulf of Cagliari. 800 Italian sailors died and 600 were captured.
- In January 1325 the Aragonese army led by Ramon de Peralta assaulted Stampace, massacring the population. Pisa had to accept a new capitulation that forced the republic to surrender definitively, Castel di Castro passed to the newborn Kingdom of Sardinia in June 1326, becoming its new capital.

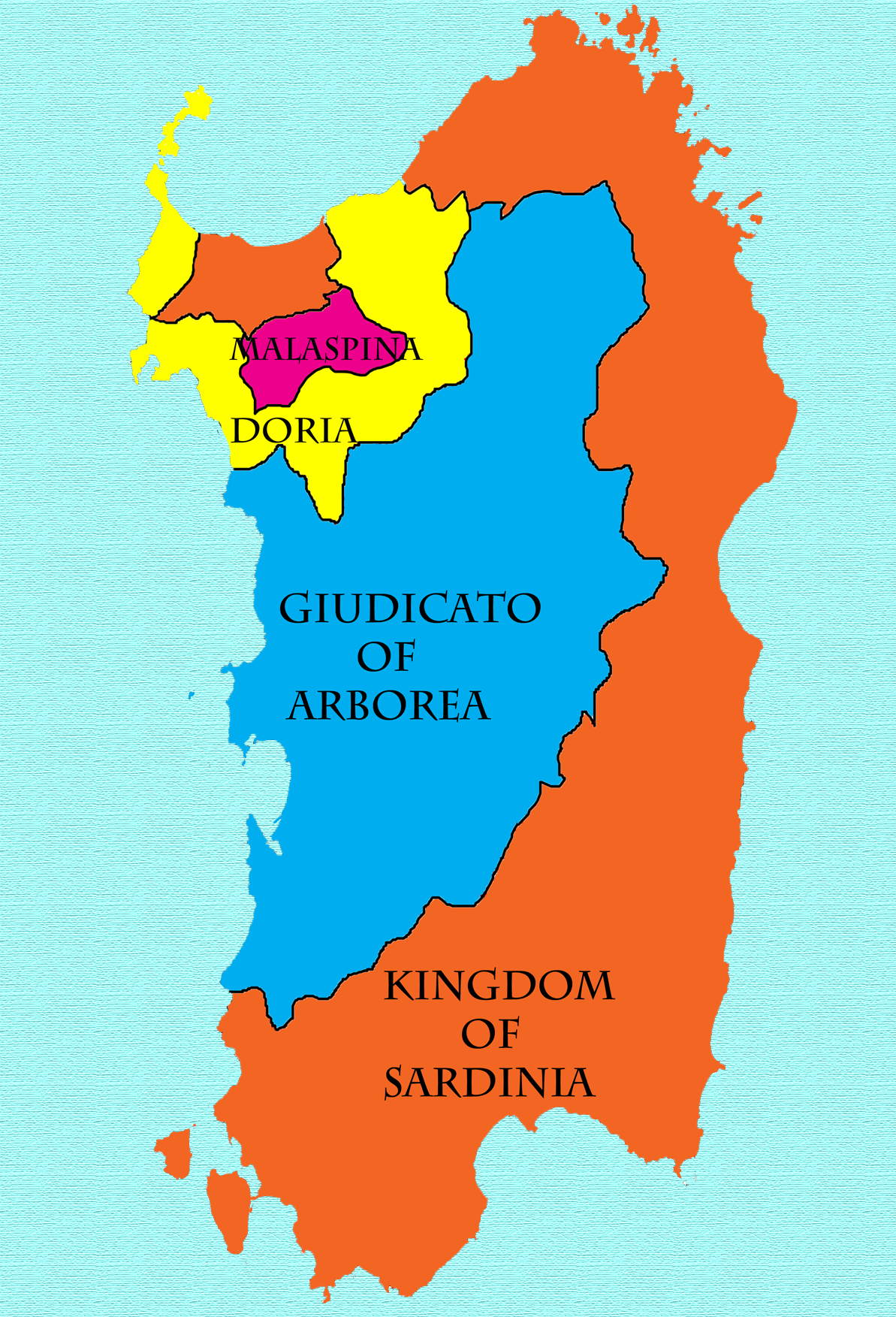
Political situation in Sardinia after the surrender of Pisa in June 1326

== Aftermath ==
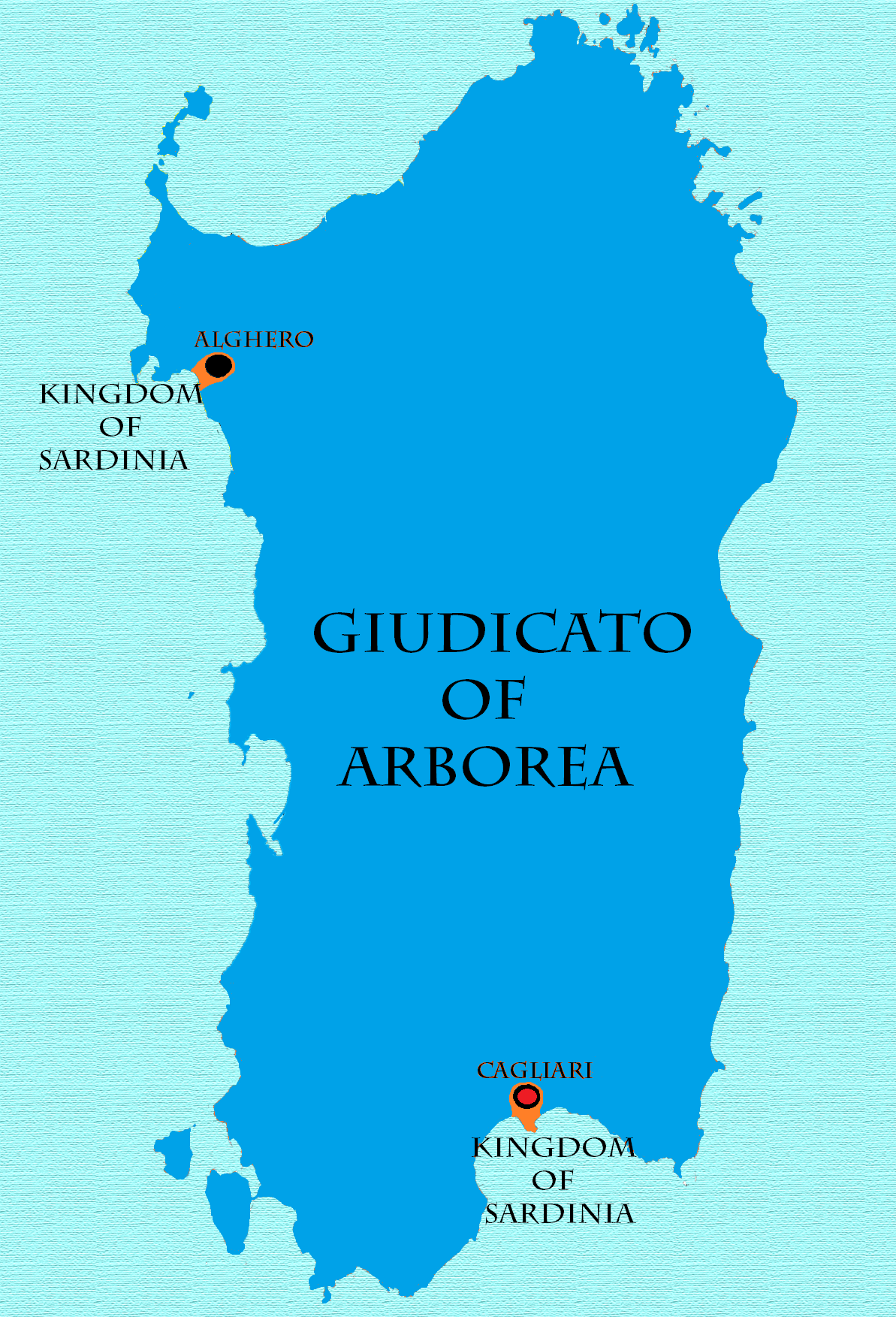
The Judicate of Arborea, between 1368–1388 and 1392–1409, controlled most of the island.

In 1347 the Doria, which controlled most of the lands of the former Logudoro state in north-western Sardinia, came again into conflict with the Crown of Aragon at Aidu de Turdu between Bonorva and Giave.

Threatened by the Aragonese claims of suzerainty and consolidation of the rest of the island, the Judicate of Arborea, under Marianus IV of Arborea, broke the alliance with the Crown of Aragon and together with the Doria declared war on the Iberians. In 1368 an Arborean offensive succeeded in nearly driving out the Aragonese from the island, reducing the "Kingdom of Sardinia" to just the port cities of Cagliari and Alghero and incorporating everything else into their own kingdom. A peace treaty returned the Aragonese their previous possessions in 1388, but tensions continued and in 1391 the Arborean army led by Brancaleone Doria again swept most of the island into Arborean rule. This situation lasted until 1409 when the army of the Judicate of Arborea suffered a heavy defeat by the Aragonese army in the Battle of Sanluri.

After the sale of the remaining territories for 100,000 gold florins to the Judicate of Arborea in 1420, the "Kingdom of Sardinia" extended throughout the island, except for the city of Castelsardo (at that time called Casteldoria or Castelgenovese), which had been stolen from the Doria in 1448. The subduing of Sardinia having taken a century, Corsica, which had never been wrestled from the Genoese, was dropped from the formal title of the Kingdom.

== Bibliography ==
- Antonio Arribas Palau, La conquista de Cerdeña por parte de Jaime II de Aragón, 1952.
- Casula, Francesco Cesare (1994). La storia di Sardegna.
- Casula, Francesco Cesare (2012). Il Regno di Sardegna-Vol.01.
- Ramon Muntaner, Crònica, 14th century.
