= Marianus II of Arborea =

Judge of Arborea from 1241 to 1297

Marianus II
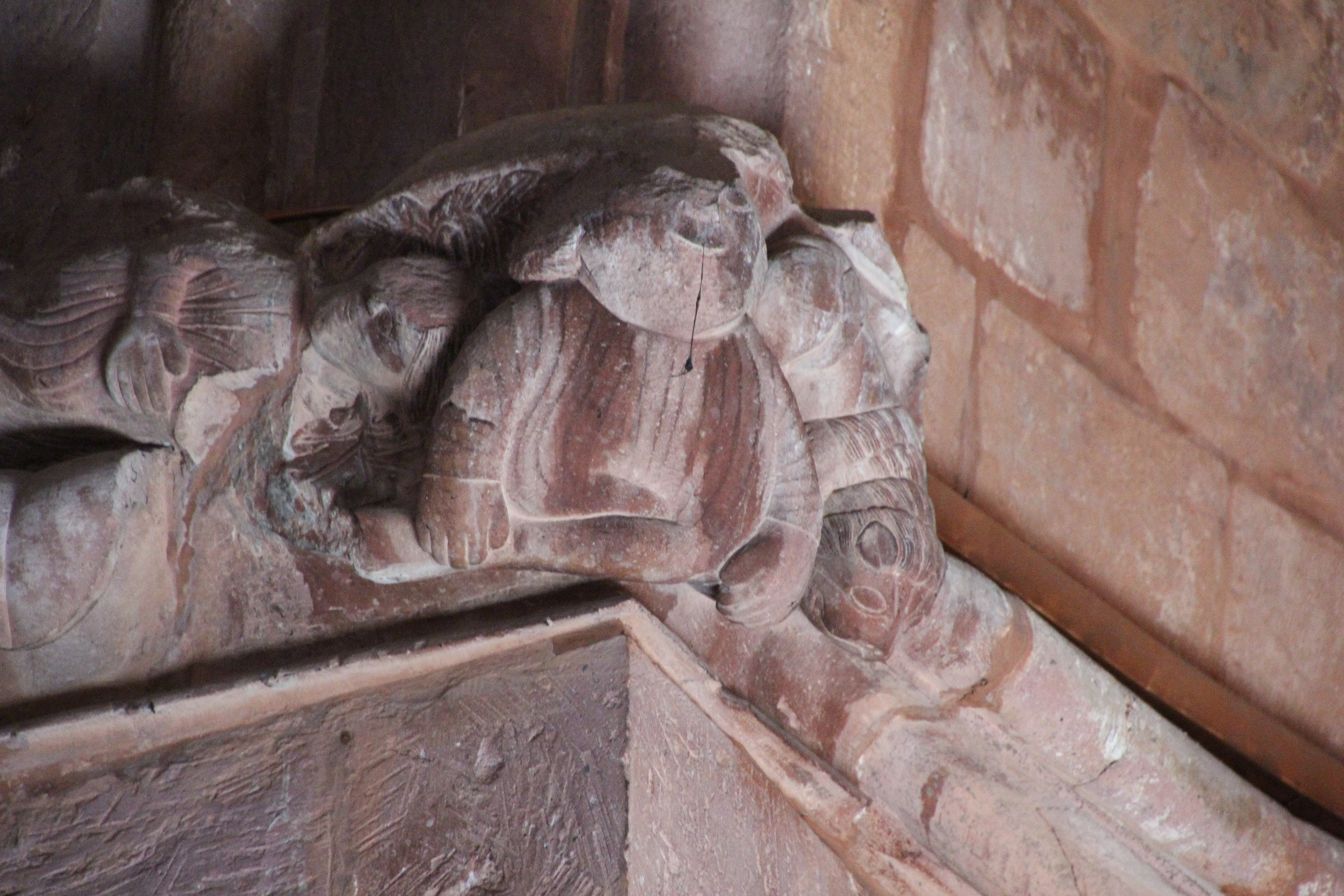

Judge/King of Arborea
- Reign: 1241–1297
- Predecessor: Peter II
- Successor: John
- Regent: William of Capraia (1241–1264)
- Born: Marianu De Serra Bas; 1230; Oristano, Sardinia
- Died: 1297 (aged 66–67); Oristano, Sardinia
- Spouse: Anna Saraceno Caldera ? della Gherardesca
- Issue: John, King of Arborea
Names
- Marianus De Serra Bas
- House: Cervera (Serra Bas branch)
- Father: Peter II, King of Arborea
- Mother: Sardinia

Marianus II (Sardinian: Marianu II; Italian: Mariano II; died 1297) was the Judge of Arborea from 1241 to his death. With skilled military action, he came to control more than half of the island of Sardinia. By his control of the vast central plains and the rich deposits of precious metals, he increased the riches of his Judicate and staved off the general economic decline affecting the rest of Europe at the time.

== Biography ==
He was the son and successor of Peter II of Arborea of the Bas-Serra family and a local woman named Sardinia. He succeeded to the throne at a young age under the regency of William of Capraia, a distant relative. William was the son of Bina de Lacon, widow of Peter I, and Hugh of Capraia, Count of Prato. William and his brothers Anselm and Berthold were pupils at the court of Peter II, who designated William regent for his son.

On William's death in 1264, Marianus did not take the full reins of power, but instead had to recognize the co-dominion of William's son Nicholas. In 1270, he imprisoned Nicholas, and in 1274 had him killed and began to govern himself, though he was soon opposed by Berthold's son Anselm, who held Cagliari.

Marianus was a close ally of the Republic of Pisa, the most powerful force on Sardinia in the mid-thirteenth century, and received Pisan citizenship on 17 June 1265. He often lived in Pisa and there he met his wife, a daughter of Andreotto Saraceno Caldera. In 1287, he married his son John with Giacomina, daughter of Ugolino della Gherardesca, of whom he was a partisan. Marianus was widowed by 1293.

In 1274, he embarked on a series of belligerent adventures to extend his power into Cagliari and Logudoro. He conquered the castle of Monforte on the Nurra and restored it, leaving an epigraph now in the museum of Sassari. In 1277, his conquests were recognised by Pope John XXI. He had annexed part of Montiferru as far as Monte Acuto with all its castles. He thus divided the Logudorese Judicate into a south and north. He was appointed vicar general of Logudoro.

In 1284, Marianus solicited the aid of Peter III of Aragon to retake Cagliari. In 1287, Anselm was defeated and killed.

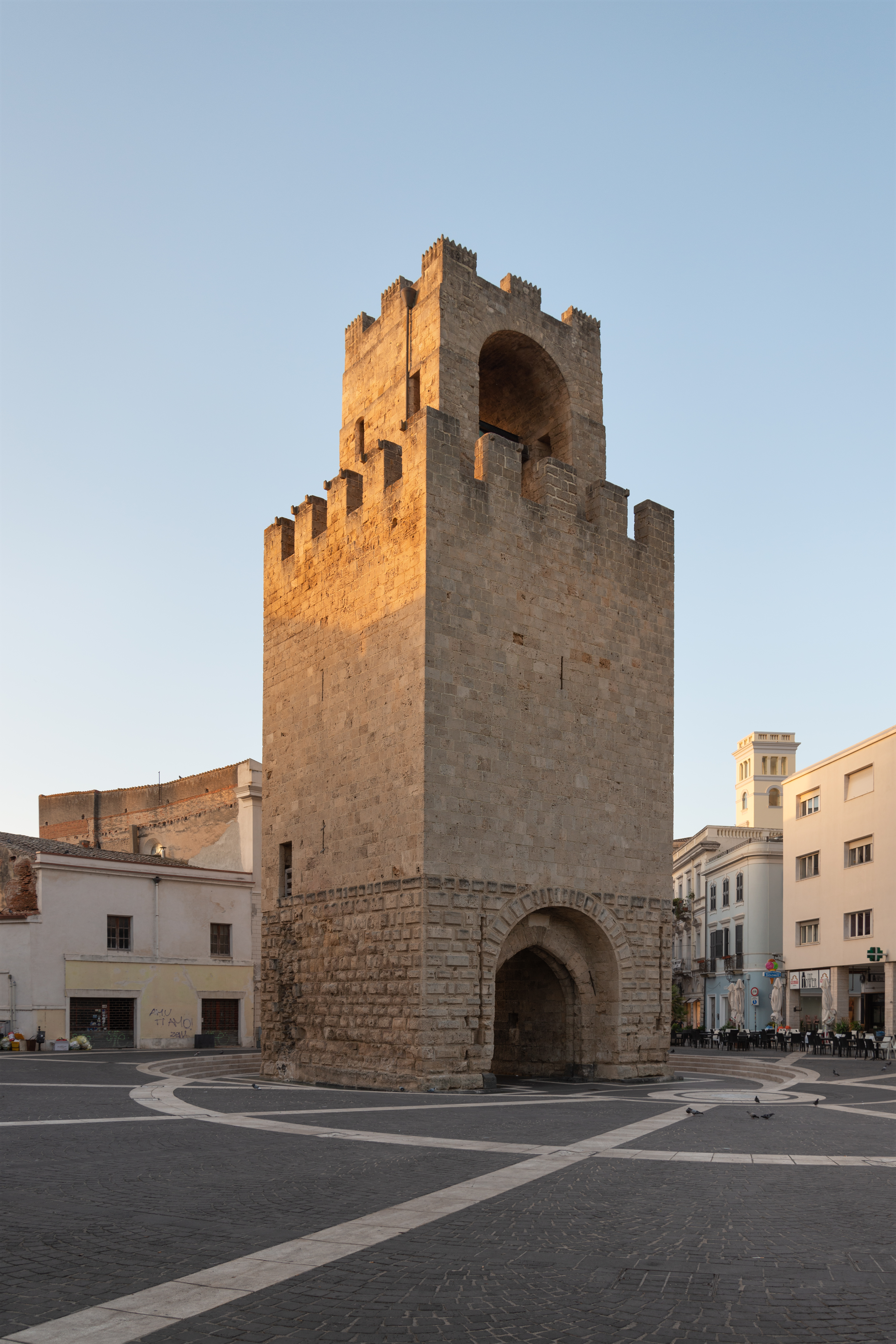
Tower of San Cristoforo or Marianus II in Oristano

On 4 January 1295, he made a political about-turn and left the third part of Cagliari to Pisa. A little later, he took part with his Gherardeschi in-laws in the siege of Villa di Chiesa, defended by the Guelphs of Donoratico. He was wounded and took refuge in San Leonardo di Siete Fuentes, where, according to some sources, he was poisoned in 1297 by the Pisans who wanted to extend their authority in Cagliari to the Argentiera of Cixerri.

Aside from his son and successor, John, he left a daughter and an illegitimate son named Barisone (died 1305).

== Sources ==
- Casula, Francesco Cesare (1994). La Storia di Sardegna. Sassari.

Preceded by Peter II	Judge of Arborea; 1241–1297	Succeeded by John
