= Nicholas of Capraia =

Nicholas of Capraia, in Italian Nicolò da Capraia or Nicolò Burgundione di Capraia (died 1274), was the judge (king) of Arborea from 1264 until 1268.

Nicholas was the son of William of Capraia and his wife of unknown name, a daughter of a Pisan notable named Ildebrandino Gualandi Cortevecchia. He had an illegitimate brother named Guglielmino. His father named him co-ruler shortly before his own death in 1264. In his father's will, he left all his possessions in Sardinia to Nicholas. William, who in 1241 had sidelined the legitimate heir to Arborea, Marianus II, forced the latter to recognize the succession of Nicholas and to recognize Guglielmino as Nicholas's heir should he died childless.

On William's death later in 1264, Nicholas was still a minor and Marianus was recognized as the bailiff (baiulus). In June 1265, Marianus on behalf of his charge signed a new agreement with the Republic of Pisa confirming Arborea's vassallage and its Pisan citizenship. In 1266, he acted "on his own behalf and as tutor of the nobleman Count Nicholas of Capraia, son of the late lord William, count of Capraia, of good memory, judge of Arborea and lord of a third part of the kingdom of Cagliari".

In 1268, Marianus usurped the judgeship, imprisoning Nicholas in the castle of Marmilla and ignoring the rights of Guglielmino. In addition to Arborea, to which Marianus had a legitimate claim, he also usurped the third of the Kingdom of Cagliari, to which he had no claim. Nicholas died in prison in 1274 without children. Marianus was forced to recognize Nicholas's cousin Anselm as co-ruler.
