= Constantine I (disambiguation) =

Constantine I (272–337), popularly known as Constantine the Great, was a Roman Emperor.

Constantine I may also refer to:

- Constantine I of Greece (d. 1923)
- Constantine I Tih (d. 1277), also known as Constantine I of Bulgaria
- Constantín mac Cináeda (d. 877), also known as Constantine I of Scotland
- Zara Yaqob (1399–1468), emperor of Ethiopia sometimes known as Constantine I

Nobles on the island of Sardinia

- Constantine I of Arborea, 11th century ruler in Arborea, on the island of Sardinia
- Constantine I of Cagliari, 11th century ruler

Nobles in the Kingdom of Georgia

- Constantine I of Imereti (d. 1327), king of the Imereti in Georgia
- Constantine I of Georgia (d. 1412), king of Georgia
- Constantine I of Kakheti (1567–1605), a.k.a. Constantine Khan, King of the Kakheti in Georgia
- Constantine I, Prince of Mukhrani (fl. 1622 – 1667), a royal of the Bagrationi dynasty of Kartli

People in Cilician Armenia

- Constantine I, Prince of Armenia (1035–1040), second "Lord of the Mountains" of Cilician Armenia
- Constantine I of Cilicia (fl. 1221–1267), Catholicos of the Armenian Apostolic Church
- Constantine I, King of Armenia (1278–1310), also sometimes called Constantine III, King of Cilician Armenia (son of Leo II, and brother of Hethum II)

Religious leaders

- Patriarch Constantine I of Constantinople (d. 677), patriarch of Constantinople from 675 to 677
- Pope Constantine (664–715), Pope from 708 to 715

== See also ==
- Constantine (disambiguation)
- Constantius I
- Constans I
