= San Nicola, Ottana =

Coordinates: 40°14′0″N 9°2′30″E

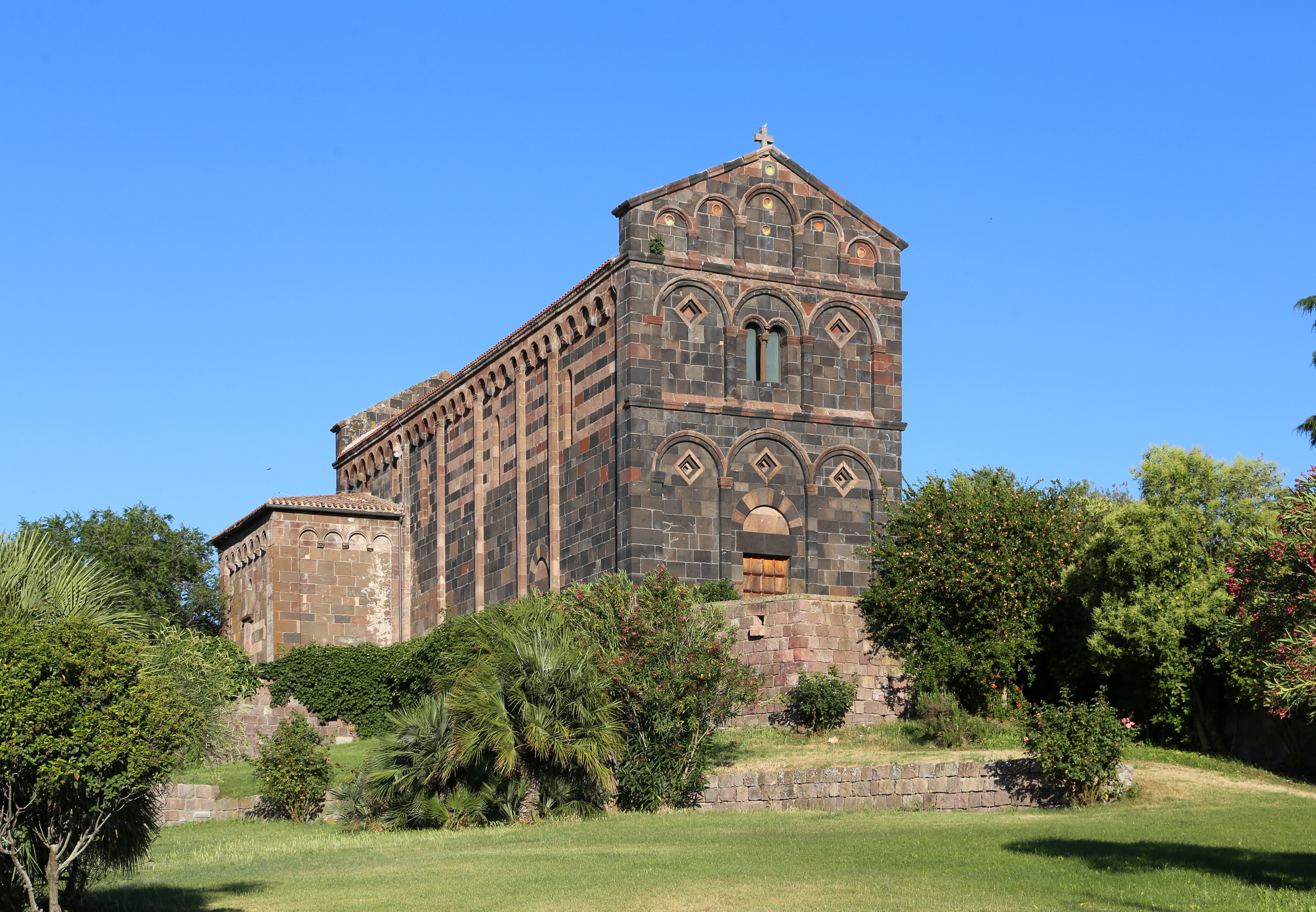
The church

San Nicola is a church in Ottana, central Sardinia, Italy. Dedicated to Saint Nicholas of Myra, it was consecrated in 1160. It is located on a hill commanding the town and is reached through a staircase.

The interior houses a 16th-century wooden crucifix and a 14th-century polyptych, known as Ottana Altarpiece. It is attributed to a "Master of the Franciscan tempera", active in Naples between 1330 and 1345. Among other figures, it portrays the then hereditary giudice of Arborea, Mariano IV of Arborea.

== Sources ==
- Coroneo, Roberto (1993). Architettura Romanica dalla metà del Mille al primo '300. Nuoro: Ilisso. ISBN 88-85098-24-X.
