= Hugh V =

Hugh V may refer to:

- Hugh V of Lusignan (died 1060)
- Hugh V, Count of Maine, ruled 1069–1072
- Hugh V, Viscount of Châteaudun (died 1180)
- Hugh V, Duke of Burgundy (1294–1315)
- Hugh V of Bas (died 1335)
