= Peter III of Arborea =

Judge of Arborea from 1335 to 1347

Peter III

Judge/King of Arborea
- Reign: 1335–1347
- Predecessor: Hugh II
- Successor: Marianus IV
- Born: c. 1314
- Died: 1347 (aged 32–33)
- Spouse: Constance of Saluzzo
Names
- Peter De Serra Bas
- House: Cervera (Serra Bas branch)
- Father: Hugh II, King of Arborea
- Mother: Benedetta

Peter III (c. 1314 –1347) of the Cappai de Bas family, was the Judge of Arborea, reigning from 1335 CE until his death in 1347 CE. He was the firstborn son and successor of Hugh II assumed the throne on his father's death.

Peter married Constance (died 18 February 1348), daughter of Thomas II of Saluzzo, towards 1326. He reigned in the shadow of his chancellor, Guido Cattaneo, Archbishop of Arborea, and the doctor of civil and penal law, Filippo Mameli, a canon of Tramatza.

When Alfonso died in 1336, Peter's brother Marianus paid homage to Peter IV of Aragon on his behalf. On 22 September 1343, he obtained from Pope Clement VI permission to found a monastery of the Clarisse.

Preceded by Hugh II	Judge of Arborea; 1336–1347	Succeeded by Marianus IV
