= Andrew of Arborea =

Judge of Arborea from 1304 to 1308

Andrew

Judge/King of Arborea
- Reign: 1304–1308
- Predecessor: John
- Successor: Hugh II
- Co-monarch: Marianus III
- Died: 3 April 1308
Names
- Andrew De Serra Bas
- House: Cervera (Serra Bas branch)
- Father: John, King of Arborea
- Mother: Vera Cappai (mistress)

Andrew (or Andreotto) (died 3 April 1308) was the Judge of Arborea from 1304.

He was the elder of two illegitimate sons of John and Vera Cappai. He co-ruled with his brother Marianus III, but he had the supremacy and the title autocrator basileus. From their mother, the Bas-Serra family which ruled in Arborea became known as the Cappai de Bas.

In 1308, Andrew acquired the castles of Serravalle di Bosa, Planargia, and Costaville from the Malaspina. These acquisitions were retained as the private holdings of the family (peculio), but were the proceeds from them were used to finance the administration of the demesne (fisc).

Preceded by John	Judge of Arborea; 1304–1308	Succeeded by Marianus III
