= Anselm of Capraia =

Anselm of Capraia was a Pisan count. His political activity extended from the Republic of Pisa to Sardinia.

Anselm was the son of Berthold, brother of William and Anselm, all three of whom went to the court of Peter II of Arborea to be educated. Anselm's mother was a daughter of Guelfo della Gherardesca, Count of Donoratico, and Uguccionella degli Uppezinghi.

Anselm was sent by the Commune of Pisa in 1273 to Gallura to fight against the judge Giovanni Visconti, who had fled from Pisa recently. He defeated him in the hard-to-defend open plain between Trexenta and Gippi. Anselm occupied the Visconti estates, but it is not known if only those in the curatoria of Gippi or those in the third of Cagliari which Giovanni had acquired as well. However, Giovanni evaded capture and returned to Tuscany on a Sicilian ship.

Anselm took over the reins of government in the Giudicato of Arborea after the imprisonment and assassination of his cousin Nicholas by the real judge, Marianus II. He attacked Marianus and tried to take over Cagliari, but was defeated and killed in 1287.

Anselm was married to Teccia, daughter of Gherardo della Gherardesca and Theodora, and niece of Ugolino. He left one son, Anselm, who was reputed to be chivalrous and gracious. On account of jealousy for the affection of the Pisan populace, Ugolino had him poisoned. Ugolino may have even feared that the Pisans would choose to replace him with Anselm. This story is the basis for the passing mention of Anselm in Dante's Inferno (where Anselm is not resident, but Ugolino is).

== Sources ==
- Pinna, Raimondo. Parte orientale vs parte occidentale: una costante condizione di marginalità nella sotria territoriale dell'Isola? 2006.
