= Siege of Villa di Chiesa =

1323 battle in Sardinia

Coordinates: 39.3167°N 8.5333°E

- Part of Aragonese conquest of Sardinia
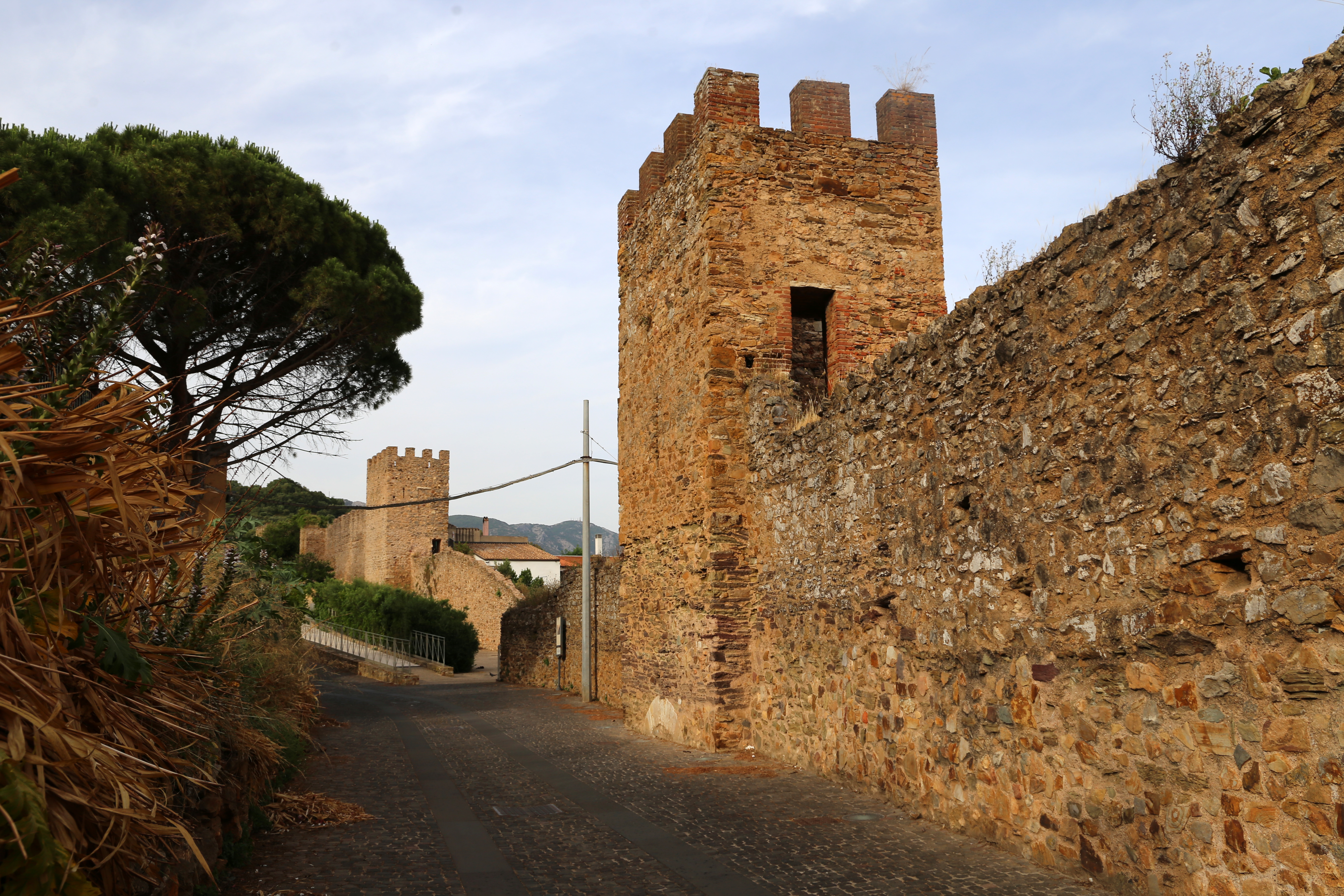
- Medieval walls of Iglesias
Date	28 June 1323 – 7 February 1324
Location	Iglesias, Sardinia
Result	Aragonese victory

Belligerents
Crown of Aragon; Giudicato of Arborea	Republic of Pisa

Commanders and leaders
Alfonso IV of Aragon; Hugh II of Arborea	Vico Ronselmini; Iacopo da Settimo

Strength
1,000+ several siege engines	250 knights 272 men-at-arms 128 archers 600 townsfolk

Casualties and losses
Heavy	Unknown

The siege of Villa di Chiesa (today Iglesias) was carried out by the army of the Crown of Aragon (under the command of Alfonso IV of Aragon) and of the giudicato of Arborea, between the summer of 1323 and the winter of 1324. It represented the first act of the Aragonese conquest of Pisan Sardinia, for the creation of the Kingdom of Sardinia.

== Siege ==
The siege was launched on the 28 June 1323. The Aragonese-Arborea army could count on thousand men and several siege engines, while the Pisan town of Villa di Chiesa provided for his defence of 250 knights, 1,000 troops, which included 128 crossbowmen, and 600 "townspeople", as well as of massive defensive walls.

Soon the hot and humid weather and the malaria epidemics decimated the besieging army. The Aragonese also suffered numerous defections; many in fact, given the unexpected long duration of the war, returned to the Iberian lands well before the end of the military operations.

For months the crossbowmen of Villa di Chiesa inflicted heavy losses on the Aragonese army that could not penetrate inside the walls. The Aragonese-Arborense alliance, to force the defenders to surrender by attrition, decided to cut all forms of supply to the besieged city.

The city surrendered on 7 February 1324, after eight months of siege. At the entrance of the Iberian troops in the city everything edible had been consumed, according to reports, the besieged ate even mice, cats, dogs, and birds before capitulating.

== Aftermath ==
The Aragonese continued with their march to Castel di Castro, defeating another Pisan army at the battle of Lucocisterna, on the 29 February.
