= Stagno di Cagliari =

Coordinates: 39°12′N 9°03′E

Designations

Ramsar Wetland
- Designated: 14 December 1976
- Reference no.: 134

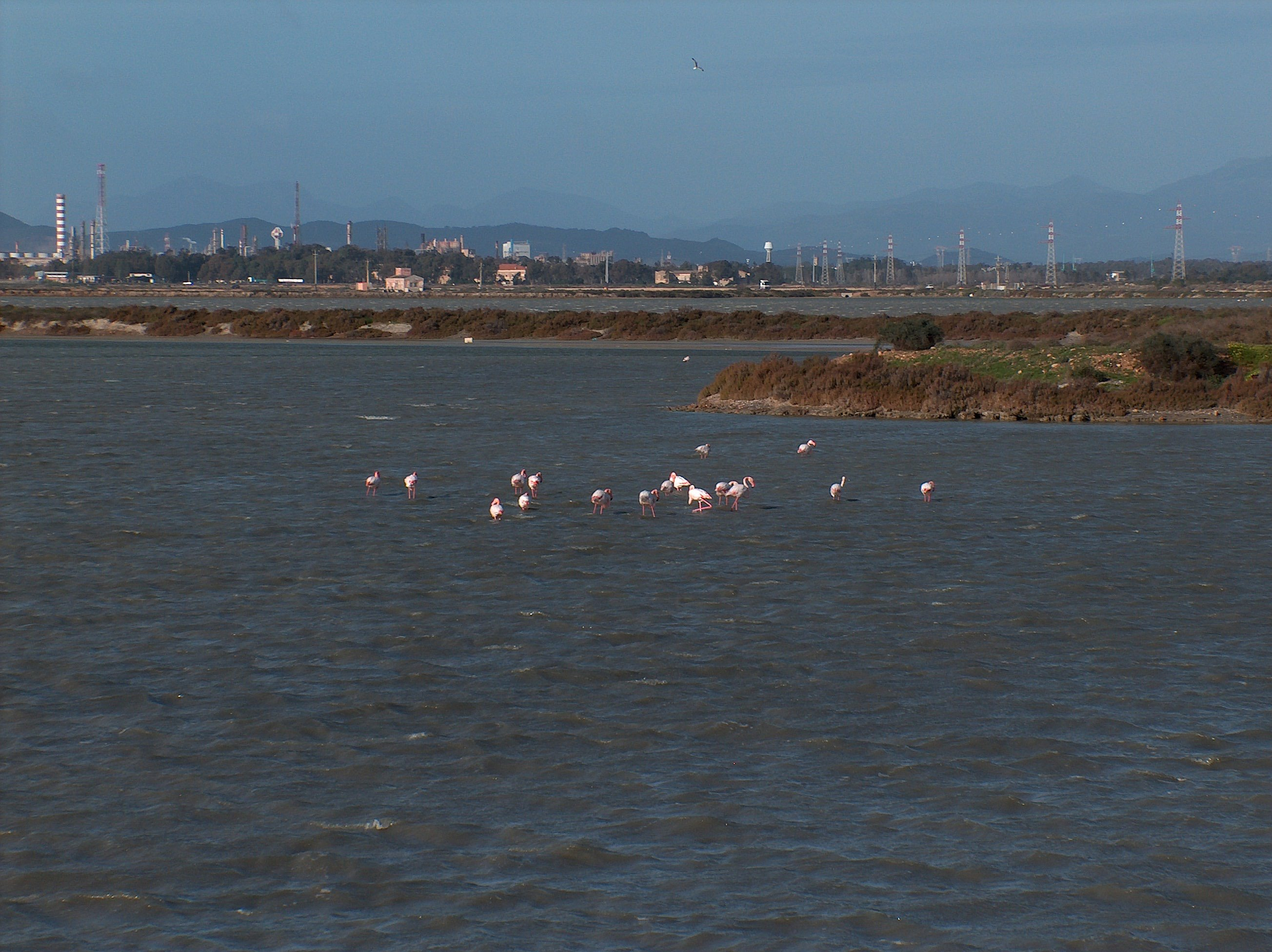
Greater Flamingos in one of the evaporation ponds of the Stagno di Cagliari.

The Stagno di Santa Gilla, or Stagno di Cagliari (literally ‘Pool of Cagliari’), is a coastal lagoon at the mouths of the rivers Cixerri and Mannu near Cagliari, on the Golfo degli Angeli in southern Sardinia, Italy. It has been designated as a wetland site of international importance under the Ramsar Convention since 1976 and is ranked among the most important of such areas in the European Union.

== Geography ==
The area of the lagoon has substantially reduced during the 20th century, due to expanding populations in the nearby settlements of Cagliari, Capoterra and Elmas, and to the construction of salt pans, roads and industrial plants. The current area is less than 13 km^{2}.

== Fauna ==
The fauna present include a great variety of bird species and it is one of the main European migration sites for the greater flamingo.
