= William of Capraia =

Sardinian regent

William of Capraia (died 1264) was the regent for Marianus II of Arborea from 1241 until his death, being entitled "Judge" from 1250 on.

== Biography ==
He was the son of Ugo degli Alberti of the Counts of Capraia and Bina, the first wife of Peter I of Arborea, whom he divorced in 1191 and who subsequently remarried (1193).

When Peter II of Arborea died in 1241, William immediately assumed the regency with the alliance of the Gherardeschi, counts of Donoratico, and the Visconti. On 29 September 1250, Pope Innocent IV recognised his sovereignty in Arborea, though the Corona de Logu never did.

In 1257, William led Arborea, along with Gallura and Logudoro, the Pisan giudicati, into a war against Genoese Cagliari. After fourteen months of war, the deposed judge of Cagliari, Salusio VI, was forced to flee and his giudicato was divided up between the victors: a third to Gallura, a third to Arborea, and a third to the Gherardeschi of Pisa. Salusio's capital, Santa Igia, was destroyed. Ogliastra and Sarrabus went to John Visconti of Gallura, while the curatori of Gippi, Nuraminis, Trexenta, Marmilla inferiore, Dolia, Gerrei, and Barbagia di Seulo went to Arborea. Sulcis, Cixerri, Nora, and Decimo were granted to Gherardo and Ugolino della Gherardesca, counts of Donoratico, while Cagliari itself went to the commune of Pisa. By its expansion into the interior of the island, Arborea ensured its long-term survival in the face of external foes.

Next, William pressed his claims to Logudoro – derived from Hugh I of Arborea, who was a uterine brother of Marianus II of Logudoro – by arms. In 1259, he entered into a lifelong battle with the Doria of Genoa after the death of Adelasia, the last ruler of the native dynasty in Logudoro.

When he died in 1264, William left the regency-judgeship to his son Nicholas.
