= Battle of Lucocisterna =

1324 battle in Sardinia

Coordinates: 39.2167°N 9.1167°E

- Part of Aragonese conquest of Sardinia
Date	29 February 1324
Location	Elmas, Sardinia
Result	Aragonese victory

Belligerents
Crown of Aragon; Judicate of Arborea; Malaspina	Republic of Pisa

Commanders and leaders
Alfonso IV of Aragon	Manfredi della Gherardesca

Strength
2,000 men-at-arms 800 cavalry	300+ men-at-arms 200+ cavalry

The Battle of Lucocisterna (or Lutocisterna) was fought on the 29 February 1324, during the Aragonese conquest of Sardinia, between the army of the Crown of Aragon, in command of the Infante Alfonso IV of Aragon, son of King James II of Aragon, and the army of the Republic of Pisa led by Manfredi della Gherardesca, Count of Donoratico.

== Background ==
The Pisan army began their landing operations on the 26 February on the beach known today as of Mary Magdalene, in the area of Capoterra, west of Cagliari, under the watchful eye of twenty-five Aragonese knights who kept Alfonso IV constantly informed.

According to one account, the vanguard of the Pisan army led by the German Enrico della Mula, consisted of 200 horsemen and 300 foot soldiers. Whilst the Aragonese army consisted of 2,000 infantry and 800 cavalry.

== Battle ==
On the 29 February, Manfredi della Gherardesca divided his Pisan army into three formations. In an effort to raise the Aragonese siege of the Pisan stronghold of Castel di Castro, he headed to the walled city, bypassing the pound of Santa Gilla through Uta and Decimomannu. To prevent the reunification of the Pisan forces and grant such an advantage, Alfonso IV gave battle in Lutocisterna, on the way to the castle. The battle was very violent.

The impetus of the Pisan Knights was providentially thwarted by the Almogavars. After the succession of two bloody frontal assaults both commanders were wounded.

Manfredi was struck violently in the face and lost his helmet and horse. Seriously wounded, he abandoned the battlefield, taking refuge in Castel di Cagliari escorted by the army. This move seems to have affected the outcome of the battle. While part of the Pisan forces reached the castle, knights and foot soldiers remaining behind died fighting heroically or sinking under the weight of heavy armor in the muddy waters of the pond of Santa Gilla.

Even the Infante of Aragon was unseated from his horse. But was saved by the intervention of the noble Santa Pau and a Cervellón who fought valiantly to defend the king and prevent the banner of Aragon from falling into the hands of the Pisans.

Enrico the Teutonic, who recovered from his wounds at Castel di Cagliari after the fall of Villa di Chiesa, also participated in the battle. During the battle he had been given the responsibility of finding and killing the Aragonese commander. However, Enrico only managed to wound him before he died in a duel against the Infante.

== Aftermath ==
During the course of the battle the Pisans managed to kill and wound 160 Aragonese, while their losses amounted to 100 cavalry and 200 infantry. When Manfredi finally came with reinforcements, the battle was over.

On the same day that the battle was fought the Pisan fleet was defeated in the Gulf of Cagliari by the Aragonese Admiral Francis Carroz. Many Pisans were captured during the battle. The Battle of Lutocisterna was the only pitched battle fought between the armies of the Republic of Pisa and the Crown of Aragon during the entire war.

== Legacy ==
Reports of the battle and the conquest of Sardinia were written by Peter IV the Ceremonious, son of Alfonso IV. His chronicles were a source widely used by later historians.
