= Baldwin (archbishop of Pisa) =

Archbishop of Pisa (died 1145)

Baldwin (died 6 October 1145) was a Cistercian monk and later Archbishop of Pisa, a correspondent of Bernard of Clairvaux, and a reformer of the Republic of Pisa. Throughout his episcopate, he greatly expanded the authority of his diocese, making it the most powerful institution in Liguria and Sardinia, and notably increased its landholdings.

Pope Innocent II named Baldwin a cardinal-priest of Santa Maria in Trastevere no later than in 1137, when he appears for the first time in this dignity. Later that year, he was in the Mezzogiorno, probably in the trail of the Emperor Lothair II. According to Peter the Deacon, he and a son of Pier Leoni (filium Petri Leonis) were at Montecassino to pacify a revolt when, in July, he participated in a debate over the rule of Cassinese monasticism in the presence of the emperor.

He was then elected to succeed Uberto as archbishop of his native city and, as the pope was then living there in exile, was consecrated by Innocent himself.

In a letter of 22 April 1138, Innocent conferred on Baldwin the apostolic legateship over Porto Torres, Populonia, Galtelli, and Civita on Sardinia. On 19 July 1139, at the exhortation of Bernard of Clairvaux and Otto of Freising, the emperor-elect Conrad III bestowed on him the countship of Pisa, making him the chief secular as well as ecclesiastical authority in the city and its countryside (contado, "county"). The whole of that year, however, he spent in Logudoro arranging matters on the island.

From 1140 to 1142, Baldwin was in conflict over the comital rights in and around Pisa. From 1138, he had been in a war with the Diocese of Lucca over jurisdiction. He was captured and freed, upon which he conquered the castrum Aghinolgum (Montignoso).

On 10 November 1144, Baldwin sent aid to Gonario II of Torres in a war against Comita II of Arborea. In 1145, he was created apostolic legate over all Sardinia and Corsica. He established the legatine seat in Torres, and excommunicating Comita – for oppressing the people and warring against Pisa – and transferring to Gonario the supreme secular authority on the island and personal authority in Arborea. Bernard of Clairvaux even weighed into island politics and sent a letter to Pope Eugene III justifying Baldwin's actions. Baldwin died later that very year and Montignoso was returned to Lucca.

== Sources ==
- Ghisalberti, Alberto M. (ed) Dizionario Biografico degli Italiani: V Bacca – Baratta. Rome, 1963.
