= Gonario II of Arborea =

Gonario II

Judge/King of Arborea
- Reign: 1116–1131
- Predecessor: Comita I
- Successor: Costantino I
- Born: 1090
- Died: 1131 (aged 40–41)
- Spouse: Eleanor of Arborea (daughter of Comita I of Arborea)
- Issue: Constantine I, King of Arborea; Eleonora; Comita II/III, King of Arborea (possibly)
Names
- Comita de Serra
- House: Lacon-Gunale (Serra branch)

Gonario or Gonnario II (born c. 1090) was the Judge of Arborea circa 1116. He is known to have been a scion of the House of Serra and married Elena, the heiress of Comita I of the Lacon-Zori. He left behind a daughter, Elena, and a son, Constantine I.

== Sources ==
- Fara, G. F. De Rebus Sardois.
- Manno, Giuseppe (1835). Storia di Sardegna. P.M. Visaj.
