= Comita II of Arborea =

12th-century Sardinian nobleman

Comita II (III)
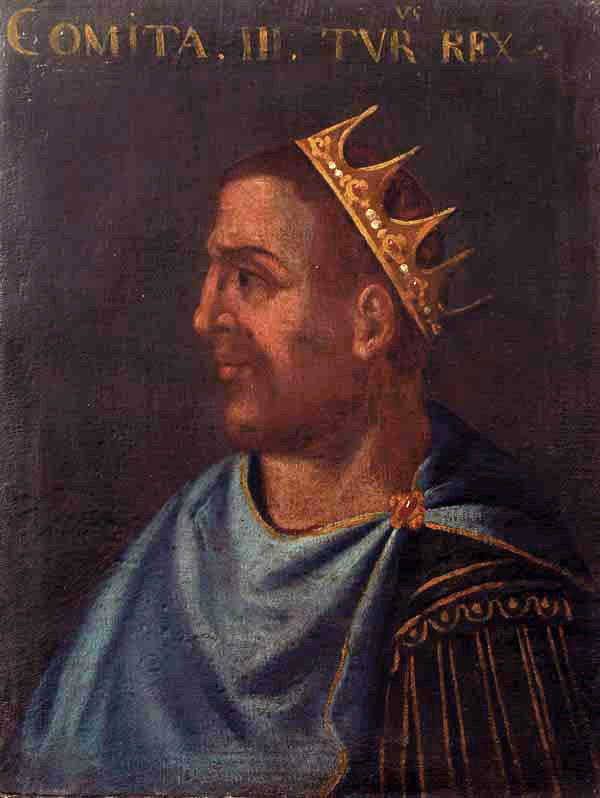

Judge/King of Arborea
- Reign: 1131–1147
- Predecessor: Constantine I
- Successor: Barisone I/II
- Died: 1147
- Spouse: Elena de Orrubu
- Issue: Barisone II/I, King of Arborea
Names
- Comita de Serra
- House: Lacon-Gunale (Serra branch)
- Father: Gonario II or Constantine I, Kings of Arborea
- Mother: Eleanor of Lacon or Anna of Thori

Comita II or III (died 1147) was the giudice (judge) of the Judicate of Arborea from 1131 until his death. He was the son of Constantine I of Arborea, the first ruler of Arborea of the Lacon dynasty. He married Elena de Orrubu, mother of Barison II of Arborea. The dating and chronology of his reign are obscure.

Comita succeeded his father Constantine I. The date of this succession is assumed to be 1131, when he first appears in a communication with the Republic of Genoa. In 1130, Constantine, Gonario II of Torres, and Comita I of Gallura swore fealty to the archbishop of Pisa. In 1133, Pope Innocent II raised Genoa to archiepiscopal status and divided the island of Sardinia between the two sees, giving the north to Genoa and the south to Pisa. In the subsequent wars of that decade, Comita was the sole ally of the Genoese.

From 1133 to 1145, there is a gap in the testimony referring to Comita and it is possible that his brother Torbeno successfully usurped his throne during a war with the Judicate of Logudoro. In 1145, Comita was back in power and was excommunicated by Baldwin, Archbishop of Pisa. The Pisan prelate, travelling the island as a papal legate, had excommunicated the judge for oppressing the people and warring against Pisa. Bernard of Clairvaux even weighed into island politics and sent a letter to Pope Eugene III to justify Baldwin's actions. Nominally Arborea was transferred to Logudoro. Comita died soon after.

== Sources ==
- Caravale, Mario (ed). Dizionario Biografico degli Italiani: XXVII Collenuccio – Confortini. Rome, 1982.
- Scano, D. "Serie cronol. dei giudici sardi." Arch. stor. sardo. 1939.
- Besta, E. and Somi, A. I condaghi di San Nicolas di Trullas e di Santa Maria di Bonarcado. Milan, 1937.

| Preceded by Constantine I | Giudice of Arborea; 1131–1147 | Succeeded by Barisone II |
