= Hugh II of Arborea =

Judge of Arborea from 1321 to 1336

Hugh II

Judge/King of Arborea
- Reign: 1321–1335
- Predecessor: Marianus III
- Successor: Peter III
- Died: 5 April 1335; Sardara
- Spouse: Benedetta
- Issue: See list: Peter III, King of Arborea; Marianus IV, King of Arborea; Bonaventura, Baroness of Xérica; Francis, canon; Mary, Viscountess of Rocabertí; John; Nicholas, canon; Lorenzo (illegittimate); Angiolesa (illegittimate); Preziosa (illegittimate)
Names
- Hugh De Serra Bas
- House: Cervera (Serra Bas branch)
- Father: Marianus III, King of Arborea
- Mother: Padulesa de Serra (mistress)

Hugh II was Judge of Arborea, reigning from 1321 until his death in 1336. He was the illegitimate son of Marianus III of Arborea and Paulesa de Serra.

Hugh sided with James II of Aragon, who had been invested with the Kingdom of Sardinia and Corsica by Pope Boniface VIII in 1297. He became vassal of James for Arborea and probably wanted to expand his control over the whole island, as governor on behalf of the Catalan Crown. To this end, he assisted the future Alfonso IV in the conquest of 1323 – 1324, when the Republic of Pisa was expelled from the island. After Alfonso's army disembarked at Palmas, Hugh joined him at the siege of Villa di Chiesa (modern Iglesias). He was present, too, at the fall of Castel di Castro on June 1324. Hugh II died of an unknown illness in 1336.

== Family ==
Hugh married Benedetta (died circa 1345). They had nine children:

- Peter III, his successor
- Marianus IV, brother's successor
- Bonaventure (died 1375)
- Francis (died 1342), canon of Urgell
- Mary (died 1392), married Guillem Galceran de Rocabertí
- John (died 1375), rebelled against brother Marianus and imprisoned
- Nicholas (died 1370), canon of Lleida, grandfather of Leonard Cubello
- Angiolesa
- Preciosa

Hugh also had an illegitimate son:

- Lawrence, legitimised 1337

== Sources ==
- Hillgarth, Jocelyn N. The Spanish Kingdoms, 1250–1516: 1250–1410 Precarious Balance. Oxford University Press: 1976.

Preceded by Marianus III	Judge of Arborea; 1321–1336	Succeeded by Peter III
