= Hugh I of Arborea =

Judge of Arborea from 1185 to 1211

Hugh I

Judge/King of Arborea
- Reign: 1192–1195 (1st time); 1206–1211 (2nd time)
- Predecessor: Peter I (1st time); William I Salusio IV (1st time)
- Successor: William I Salusio IV (1st time); Peter II (2nd time)
- Co-monarch: Peter I (1192–1195)

Viscount of Bas
- Reign: 1185–1211
- Predecessor: Hugh I
- Successor: Peter II/III
- Governor: Pere II of Cervera (1195-1198); Hug III of Torroja (1198–1211)
- Born: 1178; Oristano, Sardinia
- Died: 1211 (aged 32–33); Oristano, Sardinia
- Spouse: Preziosa of Cagliari
- Issue: Peter II, King of Arborea
Names
- Hug Ponç de Cervera
- House: Cervera
- Father: Hug I, Viscount of Cervera
- Mother: Sinispella of Arborea

The Judicates of Sardinia.

Hugh I (1178 – 1211 CE) (also Ugo I) judike of Arborea from 1185 until his death in 1211. Hugh was the son of Ispella di Serra and Hugh I of Bas. He was a grandson -through his mother- of Barisone II of Arborea.

He is often known as Ugone de Bas, Bas being the common denomination for the viscounty of Besalú.

He ascended to the throne of Arborea in 1185 when he was only seven years old, under the regency of Ramon de Torroja, the brother in law of Agalbursa, through her sister Gaia. Agalbursa was the widow of Barisone II, and paternal aunt of Hugh himself. In 1192, a compromise was reached at Oristano whereby Peter di Serra, Barisone's eldest son by his first wife Pellegrina di Lacon, was recognised as co-judike.

In 1195, William I of Cagliari invaded Arborea, imprisoning Peter and besieging Oristano, forcing Hugh to sign a pact ceding his territories and engaging him to marry Preziosa, William's daughter and a relative of the house of Peter. The marriage was celebrated in 1206.

Hugh continued to title himself "King of Sardinia" as his grandfather had done. Though Bas had been abandoned, first to Ponce III and then to his son Peter III, in 1198, it was reclaimed and Peter was financially compensated for his loss. When Hugh eventually returned to Arborea, he left the son of his former regent, Hugh III of Torroja, as regent in Besalú. Both Hughs died in 1211, the regent succeeded in the regency by his sister Eldiarda, wife of Ramon de Palau, and the king succeeded by his son Peter II.

| Preceded by Barisone II | Giudice of Arborea; 1185–1211 | Succeeded by Peter II |
