= Constantine I of Arborea =

Italian noble

Constantine I

Judge/King of Arborea
- Reign: c.1131
- Predecessor: Gonario II
- Successor: Comita II/III
- Died: 1131 (aged 40–41)
- Spouse: Ann of Thori
- Issue: Comita II/III, King of Arborea (possibly)
Names
- Constantine de Serra
- House: Lacon-Gunale (Serra branch)
- Father: Gonario II, King of Arborea
- Mother: Elena of Orrubu

Constantine I (born in the second half of the 11th century) was the Judge of Arborea. He was the son of Gonario II and Elena de Orrubu. The dates of his reign are unknown, but he was probably in power at the turn of the 12th century. It was probably dominated by wars between Genoa and Pisa which lasted from 1118 to 1133.

Constantine tightened Aborea's alliance with the Republic of Pisa. His reign followed on the Gregorian reform of the papal church and its major effect on Sardinia. Like his predecessors, Constantine probably paid the annual tribute to the Holy See of 1,100 bezants. He accepted papal and Pisan suzerainty and sponsored the expanding monasticism on the island. Monasticism provided much needed technological and economic improvements, as the monks which immigrated to inhabit the new foundations and the reformed old ones brought with them collections of books and knowledge of more efficient agricultural and construction techniques, as well as connections to the wider Christian world. There is some discrepancy over the foundation of Santa Maria de Bonarcado, but it seems likely that Constantine laid its foundation around the year 1100. He put it under the authority of the Camaldolese abbey of San Zenone in Pisa instead of the monastery of Saint-Victor in Marseille, which was the great monastic power in the rival Judicate of Cagliari. According to a charter of his grandson Barison II in 1182, he founded a monastery in dedication to San Nicolas di Urgen.

Following the Condaghe di Santa Maria de Bonarcado, Constantine's wife was Anna de Zori and he left two sons: Comita II, who succeeded him by 1131, and Orzocco.

== Sources ==
- Ghisalberti, Aldo (ed). Dizionario Biografico degli Italiani: XXX Cosattini – Crispolto. Rome, 1984.

Preceded by Gonario II	Giudice of Arborea c. 1100 – c. 1131	Succeeded by Comita II
