= John of Arborea =

Judge of Arborea from 1297 to 1304

John
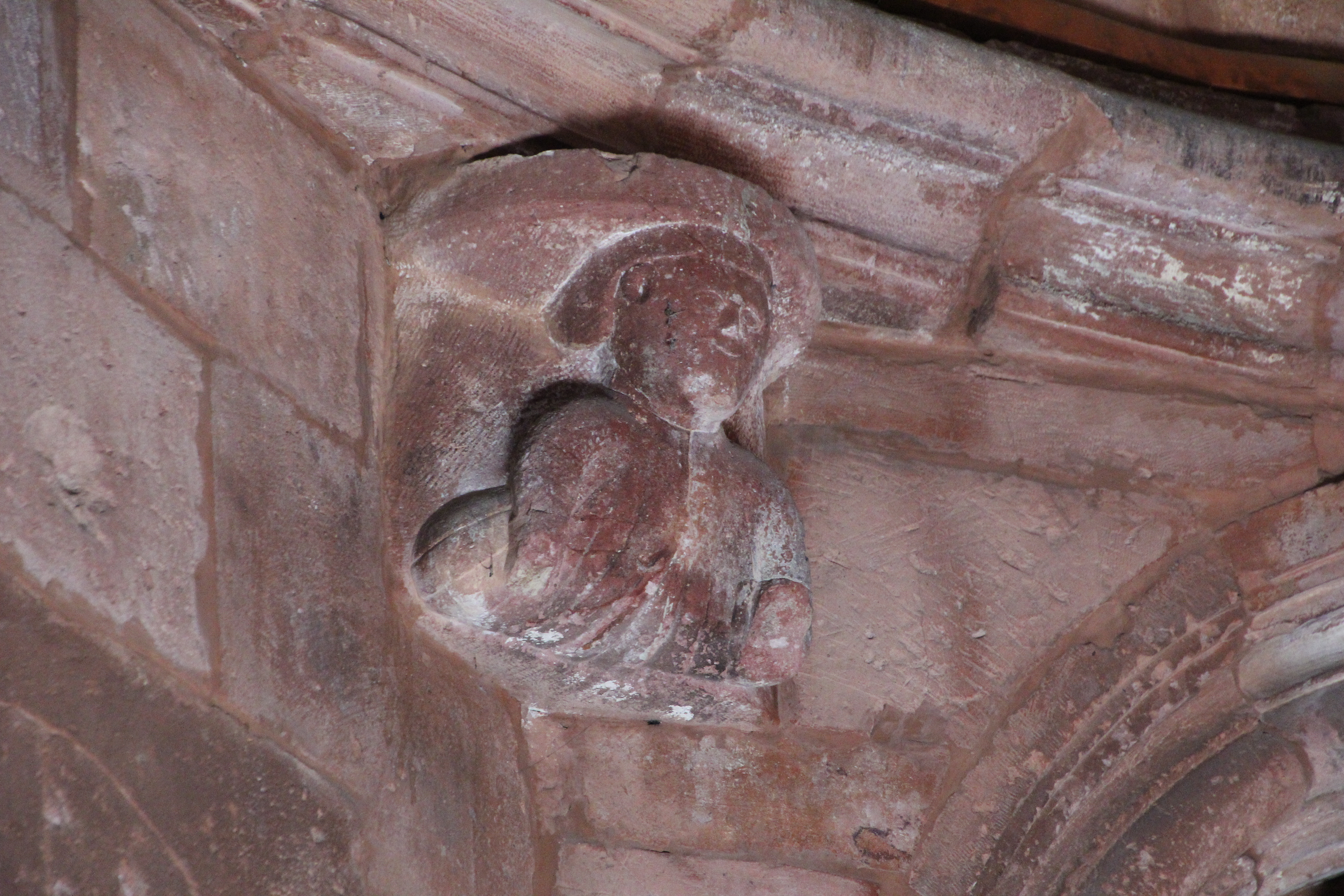

Judge/King of Arborea
- Reign: 1297–1304
- Predecessor: Marianus II
- Successor: Marianus III and Andrew
- Died: 23 March 1304
- Spouse: Giacomina della Gherardesca
- Issue: Joanna; Andrew, King of Arborea (illegitimate); Marianus III, King of Arborea (illegitimate)
Names
- John De Serra Bas
- House: Cervera (Serra Bas branch)
- Father: Marianus II, King of Arborea
- Mother: Ann Saraceno Caldera

John (died 23 March 1304), nicknamed Chiano, was the Judge of Arborea from 1297 to his death.

He was the son and successor of Marianus II and reigned initially under the tutelage of Tosorat Uberti, a Pisan nobleman. Nino Visconti of Gallura having been deposed in 1288, John was the only judge and Arborea the only Judicate left on the island of Sardinia. Shortly after his succession, Pope Boniface VIII proclaimed a Regnum Sardiniae et Corsicae: Kingdom of Sardinia and Corsica. He named James II of Aragon King and paved the way for the invasion of the two islands.

John prepared to resist. In 1300, he ceded (or sold) to Pisa the third of Cagliari which he ruled, the silver mines, and, perhaps, part of the judicial demesne. This last – the alienation of public land – released the people to revolt (bannus consensus) and they did so, executing John and cutting out his tongue.

He married Giacomina (died 12 February 1329), daughter of Ugolino della Gherardesca, in 1287, on the advice of his father, though he already had sons through a liaison with Vera Cappai, of Villasalto. He was succeeded by his sons Andrew and Marianus. He left a legitimate daughter, Joanna, who died in 1308.

Preceded by Marianus II	Judge of Arborea; 1297–1304	Succeeded by Andrew
Preceded by Marianus II	Judge of Arborea; 1297–1304	Succeeded by Marianus III
