= Marianus III of Arborea =

Judge of Arborea from 1304 to 1321

Marianus III

Judge/King of Arborea
- Reign: 1304–1321
- Predecessor: John
- Successor: Hugh II
- Co-monarch: Andrew (1304–1308)
- Born: Mariano d'Arborea
- Died: 1321
- Spouse: Constanza of Montalcino (never consummated)
- Issue: Hugh II, King of Arborea (illegitimate)
Names
- Marianus De Serra Bas
- House: Cervera (Serra Bas branch)
- Father: John, King of Arborea
- Mother: Vera Cappai (mistress)

Marianus III (died 1321), also Mariano d'Arborea, was the sole Judge of Arborea from at least 1310 to his death. He co-ruled with his elder brother Andreotto from the death of their father, John of Arborea, who left no legitimate heirs when he died sometime between 1304 and 1307.

In 1312, he was constrained by the Republic of Pisa to buy his own right of succession from the Emperor Henry VII and to marry Constance of Montalcino by proxy. In 1314, he requested aid from the Crown of Aragon against the Pisans.

He restored roads and bridges, complete the walls of Oristano and her defensive towers, and constructed a new archiepiscopal palace.

He never did marry Constance, but he did cohabitate with Padulesa de Serra, who gave him six children, among whom was his successor, Hugh II.

Preceded by Andrew	Judge of Arborea; 1308–1321	Succeeded by Hugh II
