= Cixerri =

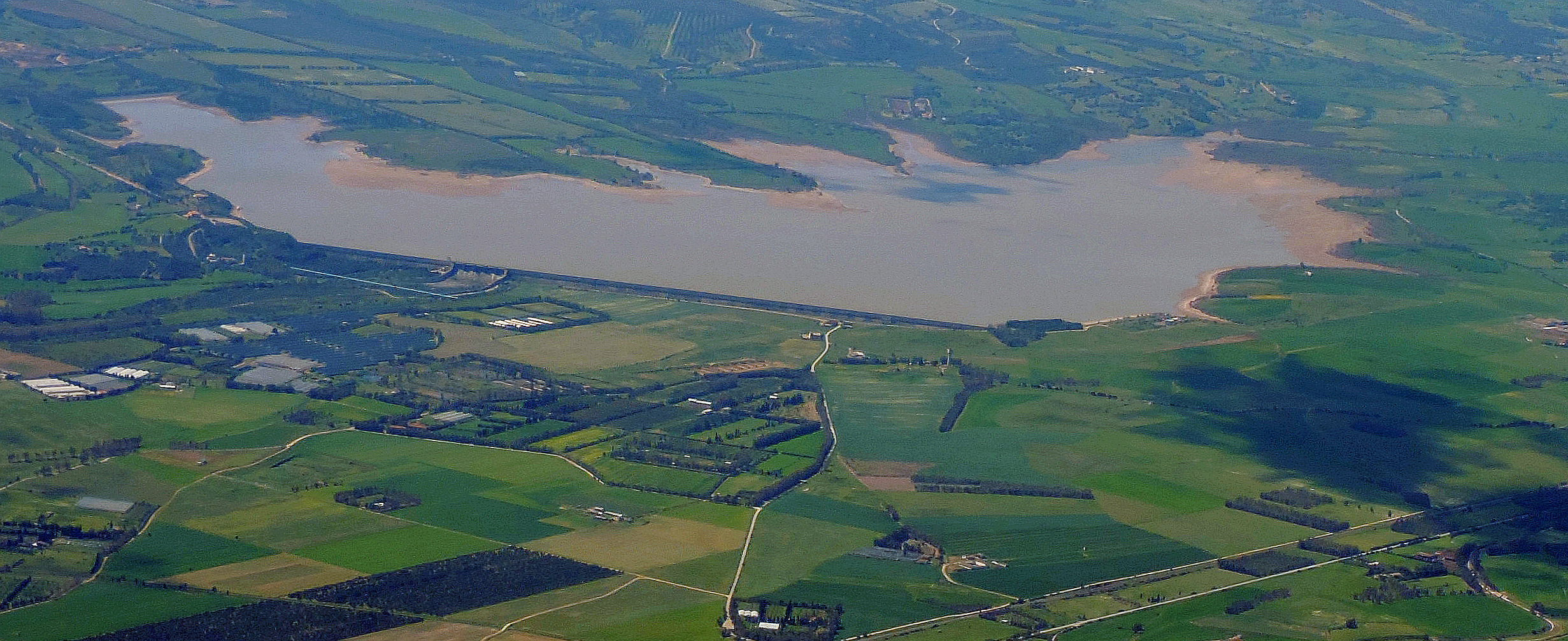

Location
- Country: Italy

Physical characteristics
- Source
  - location: Monte Croccoriga
  - elevation: 313 m (1,027 ft)
- Mouth: Stagno di Cagliari
  - coordinates: 39.2620°N 9.0078°E
- Length: 40 km (25 mi)

Basin features
- Progression: Stagno di Cagliari→ Tyrrhenian Sea

The Cixerri (Sardinian pronunciation: [tʃiˈʒeri]) is an Italian river in southern Sardinia province of Cagliari. It rises from Monte Croccoriga, at 313 metres (1,027 ft) above sea level, in the province of South Sardinia. The river flows into a lake north of Iglesias and then exits the lake and flows eastward. The river is joined by a tributary north of Villamassargia and south of Musei before entering the province of Cagliari. The river flows past Siliqua and is joined by another tributary from the south. Finally, the river enters the Stagno di Cagliari close to the mouth of the Flumini Mannu near Assemini.
