= Flumini Mannu =

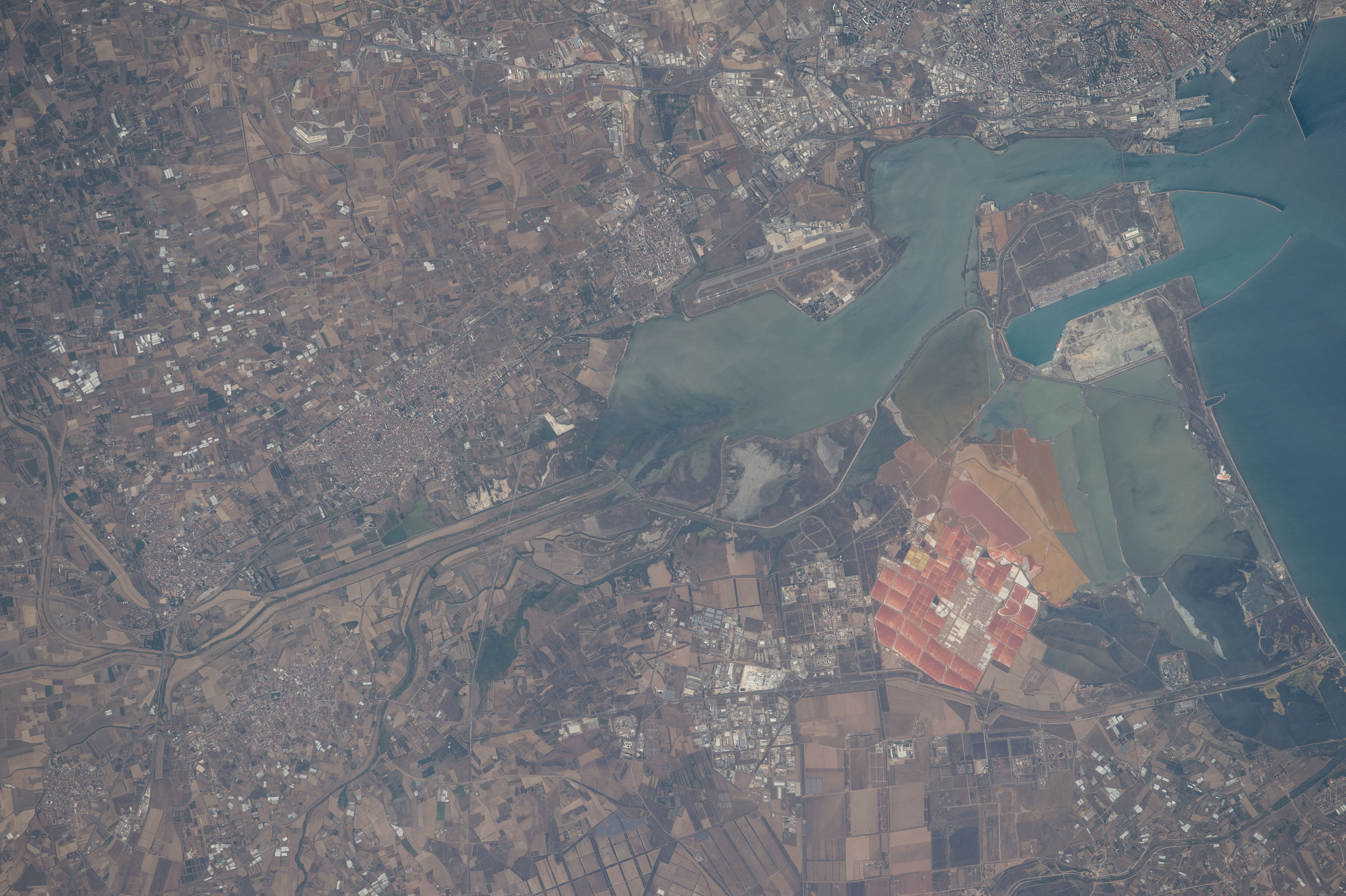

Location
- Country: Italy

Physical characteristics
- Mouth: Stagno di Cagliari
  - coordinates: 39.2633°N 9.0105°E
- Length: 42 km (26 mi)

Basin features
- Progression: Stagno di Cagliari→ Tyrrhenian Sea

The Flumini Mannu is a river in southern Sardinia, Italy.

Its springs are located in the hills east of Sardara. It flows into the Stagno di Cagliari after a course of 42.14 kilometres (26.18 mi). The river's main tributaries are the Riu Bellu and the Rio Sitzerri, which form most of the basin of Monte Linas massif's waters.
