= Marianus IV of Arborea =

Judge of Arborea from 1347 to 1376

Marianus IV
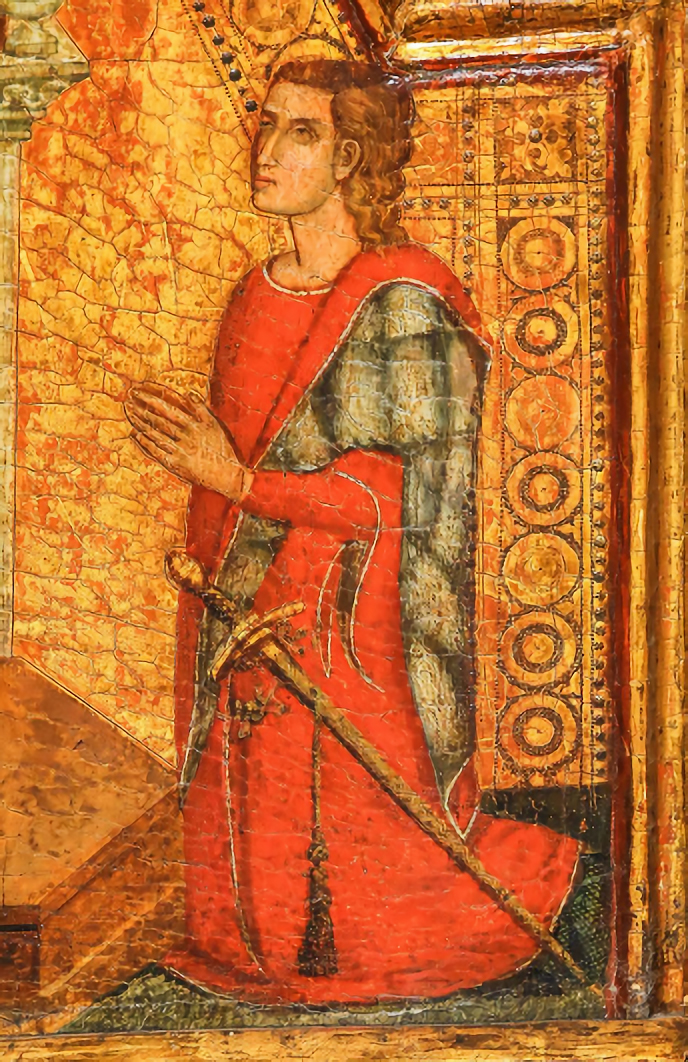
- Marianus IV of Arborea, church of San Nicola (Ottana)

Judge/King of Arborea
- Reign: 1347–1376
- Predecessor: Peter III
- Successor: Hugh III
- Born: Marianu De Serra-Bas; 1319; Oristano, Sardinia
- Died: May 1376 (aged 56–57); Oristano, Sardinia
- Spouse: Timbora de Roccabertí
- Issue: Hugh III, King of Arborea; Beatrice, Viscountess of Narbonne; Eleanor, Queen of Arborea; An unnamed daughter
Names
- Marianus De Serra Bas
- House: Cervera (Serra Bas branch)
- Father: Hugh II, King of Arborea
- Mother: Benedetta

Marianus IV (in Sardinian: Marianu IV de Arbarèe, in aragonese: Marià IV d'Arborea, 1319–1376), called the Great, was the Judge (king) of Arborea, kingdom in the island of Sardinia, from 1347 to his death. He was, as his nickname indicates, the greatest sovereign of Arborea. He was a legislator and a warrior whose reign saw the commencement of massive codification of the laws of his realm and incessant warfare with the Crown of Aragon. He was also a religious man, who had connections to Catherine of Siena. He was, in short, a "wise legislator, able politician, and valiant warrior."

== Early life in the Kingdom of Aragon ==
Born at Oristano, he was the son of Hugh II and successor of his brother Peter III. At the behest of his father he spent most of his youth in Barcelona, where he was educated at the court of Alfonso IV of Aragon. He participated actively in the coronation of Peter IV in 1336. In 1336 in Barcelona, he married Timbora, daughter of Dalmatius IV of Rocabertí and Beatrice of Serrallonga, Baroness of Cabrenys. In 1339, he was invested by Peter with the counties of Goceano and Marmilla, in Sardinia.

In 1347, the Doria rebelled and defeated the Aragonese at Aidu de Turdu, occupying Bonorva. This sparked a long war between Aragon and Genoa, but at the outset the Doria could not take advantage of their victory. On 11 September 1349, he returned to Oristano, two years after succeeding his childless elder brother. One of his first acts was to repopulate the town of Goceano, rebuild the castle there, and plant a florid garden.

== War with Aragon ==
Though an alliance had been in effect with Aragon for more than fifty years at the time of his accession, Marianus realised that the political aim of Peter IV was nothing less than the annexation of Sardinia and, following the conquest of Alghero (1353), he parted ways with the Aragonese. He allied with the Genoese and the Doria, then at war with Aragon, and made himself an enemy of the Aragonese.

Marianus' first directive was against Gherardo della Gherardesca, a loyal Pisan vassal of the Aragonese. He attacked Castel di Castro from the south but was rebuffed. He initiated a siege until his Doria allies could attack from the north. They did, and took Alghero. His armies proved successful in the field and he succeeded in expelling the Aragonese from every redoubt on the island save the stronghold of Castel di Castro. He even menaced Sassari in 1354. Later that year, Peter IV landed on the island at Nulauro. Marianus promptly began a guerilla war of ambushes against royal troops until, at the end of 1355, a brief peace was signed at Sanluri by which Marianus renounced Alghero. The peace lasted two years, during which Marianus reinforced his armies and the country progressed favourably economically.

In 1365, the war resumed with full force. Pope Urban V confirmed Arborean possession of the whole of the island save Sassari, Alghero, and Cagliari. Peter IV, however, sent a fleet commanded by Pere de Luna to lead an Aragonese army deep into Arborea, bypassing other fortifications to assault Oristano. The Aragonese troops were trapped between the Arborean armies commanded by Marianus and his son, the future Hugh III, and defeated. In 1368, Marianus finally occupied Sassari. He was preparing another campaign when he died in 1376.

== Legislation ==
During the two-year peace, Marianus began the work of putting down in writing the oral laws and customs of Arborea. The chief legislative work of his lifetime was the Codice Rurale, which his daughter Eleanor later incorporated into her massive Carta de Logu. His great work, however, was cut short by his sudden death of the bubonic plague in 1376.

== Wife and children ==
By his wife Timbora, Marianus left four children:

- Hugh III, his successor
- Eleanor, his son's successor
- Beatrice (died 1377), married (1363) to Aimery VI of Narbonne
- an unnamed daughter who died young on 14 January 1343

Timbora was still living in 1361, but that is the last she is heard of.

== Sources ==
- Casula, Francesco Cesare (1984). Genealogie medioevali di Sardegna. Due D Editrice mediterranea.
- Nowé, Laura Sannia. Dai "lumi" dalla patria Italiana: Cultura letteraria sarda. Mucchi Editore: Modena, 1996.
- Onnis, Omar; Mureddu, Manuelle (2019). Illustres. Vita, morte e miracoli di quaranta personalità sarde (in Italian). Sestu: Domus de Janas. ISBN 978-88-97084-90-7. OCLC 1124656644.

Preceded by Peter III	Judge of Arborea; 1347–1376	Succeeded by Hugh III
