= Judge of Arborea =

Sardinian noble title

The Giudicati of Sardinia

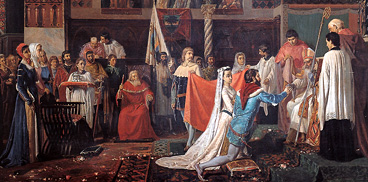
Marriage of Eleanor and Brancaleone

The Kings or Judges of Arborea (from the Latin iudices and the Sardinian judikes, "judges", the title of the Byzantine officials left behind when imperial power receded in the West) were the local rulers of Arborea in the west of Sardinia during the Middle Ages. Theirs was the longest-lasting judgedom, surviving as an independent state until the fifteenth century.

== House of Lacon Gunale ==
- Gonario I (c. 1015 – c. 1038)
- Barisone I (c. 1038 – c. 1060)
- Marianus I (c. 1060 – c. 1070)
- Orzocorre I (c. 1070 – c. 1100)
- Torbeno (c. 1100)
- Orzocorre II (c. 1100 – c. 1122)
- Comita I

== House of Lacon Serra ==
- Gonario II
- Constantine I (c. 1101 – 1131)
- Comita II (1131–1147)
- Orzocorre III, co-ruler
- Barisone II (1146–1186)
- Hugh I (1185–1211), in opposition to Peter until 1192
- Peter I (1185–1214), in opposition to Hugh until 1192
- Peter II (1211–1241), sole ruler from 1217
- Barisone III (1214–1217)

== House of Bas Serra (Baux Serra) ==
- Marianus II (1241–1297)
  - William of Capraia (1241–1264)
  - Nicholas of Capraia (1264–1274)
  - Anselm of Capraia (1274–1287)
- John (1297–1304)
- Andrew (1304–1308)
- Marianus III (1308–1321)
- Hugh II (1321–1336)
- Peter III (1336–1347)
- Marianus IV (1347–1376)
- Hugh III (1376–1383)

== House of Doria Bas (Doria Baux) ==
- Frederick (1383–1387)
  - Eleanor (1383–1387), co-rule first time
- Marianus V (1387–1407)
  - Eleanor (1387–1402), co-rule second time

== House of Narbonne ==
- William (1407–1410)
  - Leonardo Cubello (regent: 1407–1410)

Arborea underwent a succession crisis following the death of Marianus V. William, a great grandson of Marianus IV, was crowned king in 1409, but, unable to assert his claim by force, sold the title to Alfonso V of Aragon in 1420. The following were titular rulers.

- Leonardo Cubello (1410–1427), Margrave of Oristano and Count of Goceano
- Antonio Cubello (1427–1463), Margrave of Oristano and Count of Goceano
- Salvador Cubello (1463–1470), Margrave of Oristano and Count of Goceano
- Leonardo de Alagona (1470, claimed the positions of Margrave of Oristano and Count of Goceano, raised a revolt

Rights passed to the House of Alagona, lords of Sastago and Pina, whom the Aragonese deposed as a result of the revolt.
