= Hugh V of Bas =

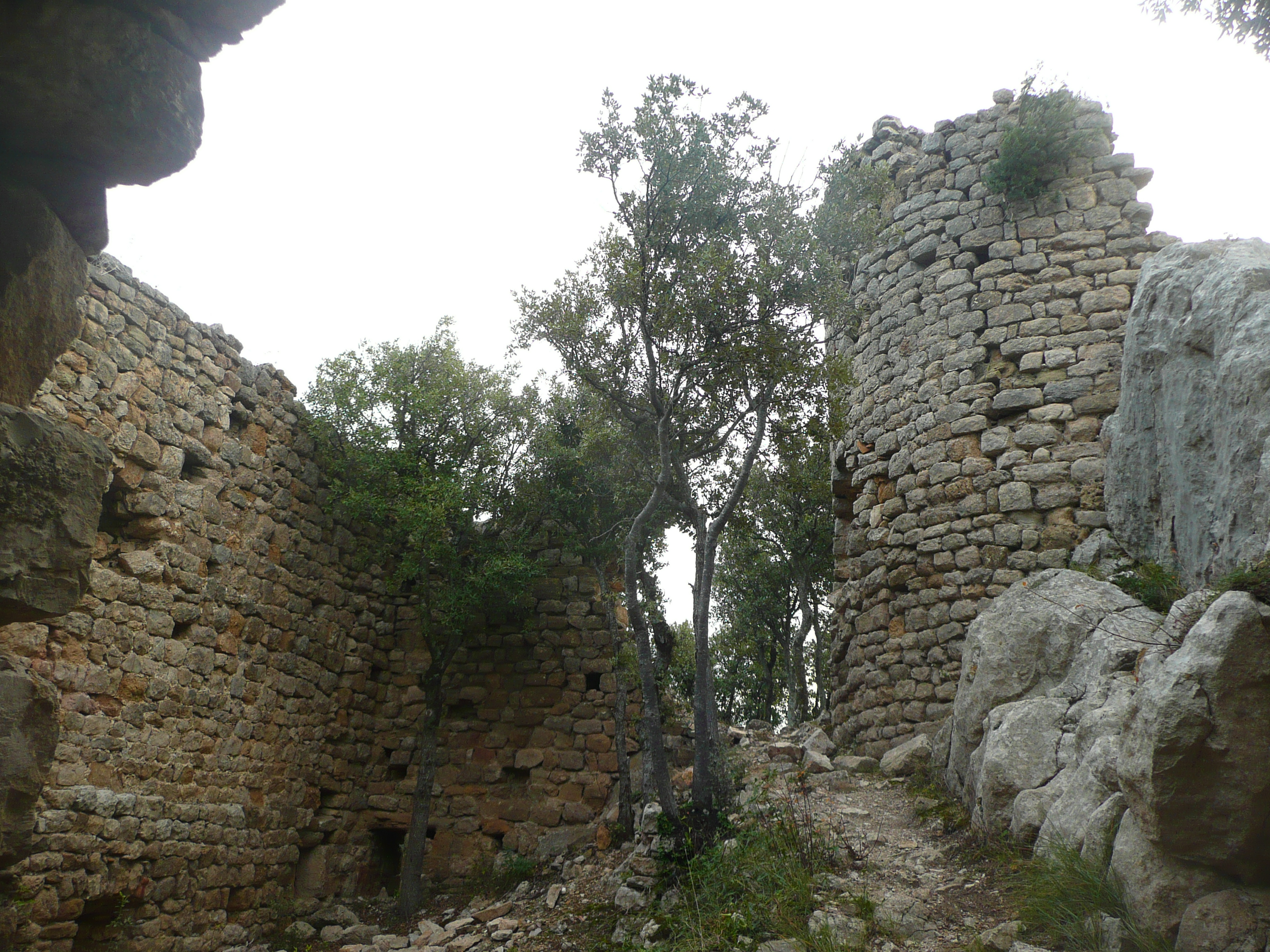
The castle of Beuda (El Castellot) belonged to Hugh until 1299, when he sold it.

Hugh V (Catalan: Hug, Italian: Ugo, Ugone, Spanish: Hugo; died 1335), a Catalan nobleman and military leader, was the twentieth viscount of Bas. He lived for a time in the Kingdom of Sicily, where he was appointed count of Squillace in Calabria. He is sometimes known by the diminutive Huguet (Italian: Ughetto, Spanish: Hugueto).

He was a younger son of Count Hugh V of Empúries and Sibil·la de Palau, viscountess of Bas. His brother, Ponç V, inherited Empúries in 1277 and was invested with Bas as heir of his mother in 1285. In 1291, he granted the viscounty of Bas to his brother Hugh. In 1300, King James II confiscated the viscounty because Hugh, as count of Squillace, was fighting for King Frederick III of Sicily. Frederick, James's brother, had been proclaimed king of Sicily by the nobility after James had signed the Treaty of Anagni (1295) turning Sicily over to the pope.

On 1 August 1302, Frederick asked his brother James to restore Hugh the lands he had confiscated. The following day, Queen Eleanor, sent a letter with an ambassador, Guillem Galceran de Cartellà, to James to second her husband's request. On 4 August, Eleanor, through Viscount Jaspert V de Castelnou, asked her sister, Blanche, who was James's queen, to intercede with James for the restoration of Hugh's domains. In 1331 the viscounty was sold to Hugh by Alfonso IV in exchange for 70,000 sous.

During his time in the service of Frederick III, Hugh was made lord of Paternò and count of Squillace. In 1302, when the king and queen were petitioning for the restoration of his lands in Spain, he held the high office of Grand Marshal of the kingdom.

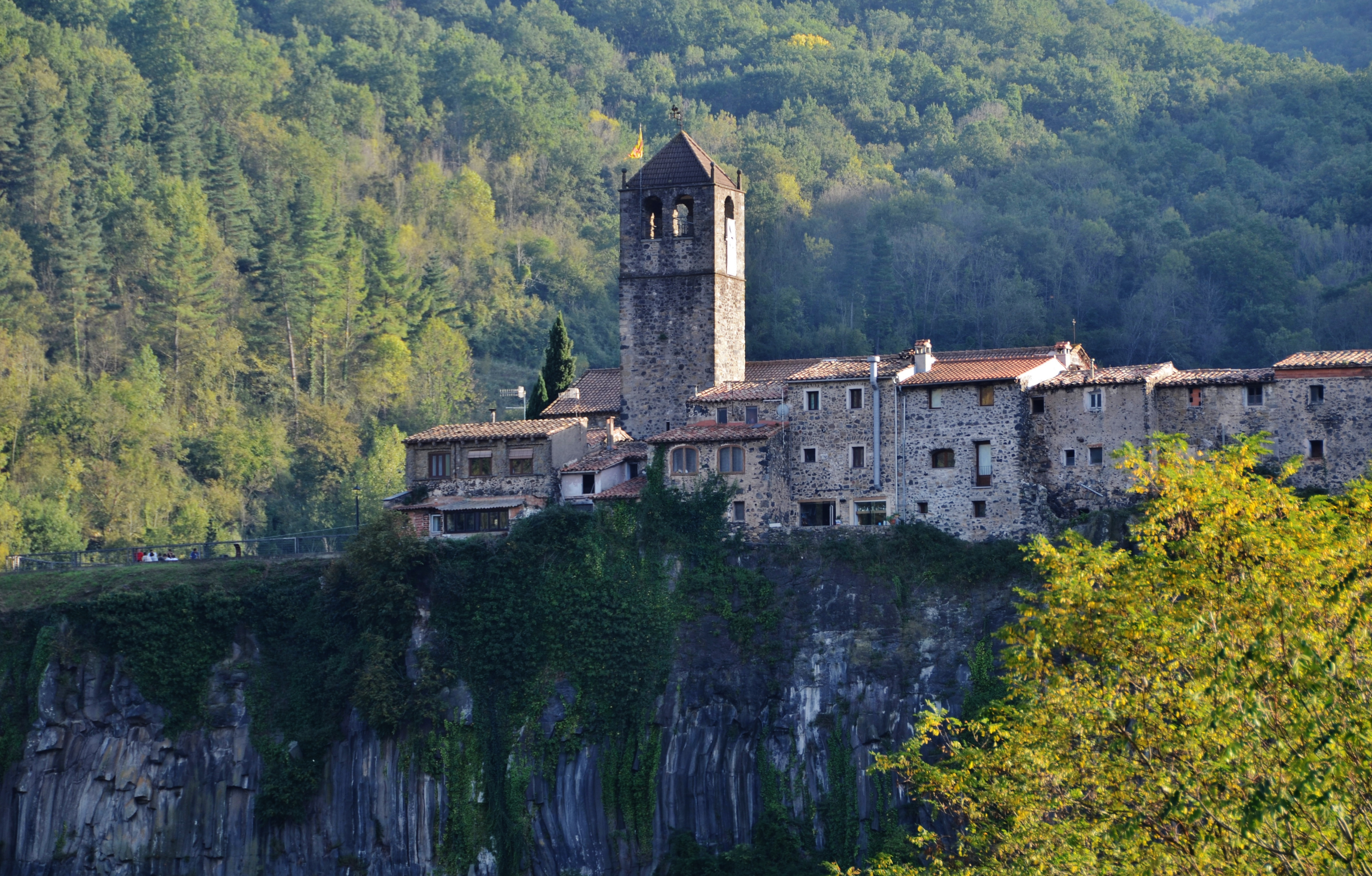
The castle of Castellfollit, which Hugh held until his death

An iron and silver bridle found in Turkey bearing the arms of the counts of Empúries may have belonged to the count of Squillace. In a letter dated 1298, Count Ponç V refers to his brother Hugh as a prisoner of the sultan of Egypt.

According to Jerónimo Zurita writing in the sixteenth century, at the battle of Capo d'Orlando on 4 July 1299, Frederick divided the command of his flagship, with Bernat Ramon de Ribelles in charge of the helm, Hugh of Squillace in charge at the prow and Garci Sánchez in charge of the standard and the knights. Later that year, Frederick removed Blasco I d'Alagona from the lordship of Catania and replaced him with Hugh.

Besides Bas, Hugh was lord of Beuda and Castellfollit in Catalonia. He sold the castle of Beuda to Viscount Dalmau VI de Rocabertí in 1299, In Hugh's absence in 1332, the viscount's mills were destroyed at Castellfollit. On 4 July, Alfonso IV authorised Hugh to investigate the matter and punish those responsible.

== Marriage and descendants ==
Hugh was married to a woman named Violant. He had an illegitimate son, Ramon, who died in 1326.

== Sources ==
- Brook, L. L.; Casula, F. C.; Costa, M. M.; Oliva, A. M.; Pavoni, R.; Tangheroni, M., eds. (1984). Genealogie medioevali di Sardegna. Due D Editrice Mediterranea.
- Canet Avilés, Jordi (2014). "Notes sobre els contactes polítics, comercials i culturals entre el comtat d'Empúries i l'illa de Sardenya durant els segles XIII–XIV". Annals de l'Institut d'Estudis Empordanesos. 45.
- Caruso, Giovanni Battista (1740). Memorie istoriche di quanto è accaduto in Sicilia dal tempo de' suoi primieri Abitatori sino alla coronazione del re Vittoio Amedeo. Vol. Part II, vol. 2. Palermo: Antonino Gramignani.
- Fluviá y Escorsa, Armand de (1979). "Los vizcondes de Besalú, después llamados de Bas". Estudios a la Convención del Instituto Internacional de Genealogía y Heráldica con Motivo de su XXV Aniversario (1953–1978). Madrid: Hidalguía. pp. 197–201. ISBN 84-00-04410-X.
- Fluviá y Escorsa, Armand de (2004). "La Promoció de la genealogia, l'heràldica i la nobiliària dins de la història en general". Butlletí de la Societat Catalana d'Estudis Històrics: 61–66.
- Marrone, Antonino (2009). Repertorio degli atti della Cancelleria del Regno di Sicilia dal 1282 al 1377 (PDF). Palermo: Mediterranea Ricerche Storiche (online).
- Pagés i Pons, Joan (1982). "El Comte Sunifred i el Monestir de Sant Benet de Bages". Annals del Patronat d'Estudis Històrics d'Olot I Comarca. 4: 139–70.
- Sánchez Martínez, Manuel (1996). "Violencia señorial en la Cataluña Vieja: la posible práctica del ius maletractandi en el término de Castellfollit (primer tercio del s.XIV)". Miscel•lània de Textos Medievals. 8: 199–229. hdl:10261/35353.
- Zurita, Jerónimo (1562). Los cinco libros primeros de la primera parte de los anales de la Corona de Aragón. Zaragoza: Pedro Bernuz. The online edition, edited by Ángel Canellas López, José Javier Iso, María Isabel Yagüe and Pilar Rivero, was published in 2003.
