= Peter II of Arborea =

Judge of Arborea from 1221 to 1241

Peter II

Judge/King of Arborea
- Reign: 1211–1214 (1st time); 1217–1241 (2nd time)
- Predecessor: Hugh I (1st time); Barisone II Torchitorio IV (2nd time)
- Successor: Barisone II Torchitorio IV (1st time); Marianus II (2nd time)

Viscount of Bas
- Reign: 1211–1241
- Predecessor: Hugh I
- Successor: Simon de Palau (governor until 1241)
- Governor: See list: Pere II of Cervera (1211-1220); Eldiarda de Tarroja (1220-1231); Simon de Palau (1231-1241)
- Died: 1241
- Spouse: Diana Visconti; Sardinia
- Issue: Marianus II, King of Arborea
Names
- Peter De Serra Bas
- House: Cervera (Serra Bas branch)
- Father: Hugh I, King of Arborea
- Mother: Preziosa of Cagliari

Peter II (died 1241) was the Judge of Arborea from 1221 to his death. He was also Peter IV, Viscount of Bas. He was "pious and submissive to the church" and his extensive "donations of privileges and judicial lands impoverished his state of glory."

Peter's father, Hugh I, of the Bas family, died in 1211 while Peter was still a child. By treaty, Hugh had shared the throne with Peter I from 1195 and Peter was still living when Hugh died. In 1214, Peter I died, as did William I of Cagliari, his supporter. Peter's successor, Torchitorio IV, laid claim to Peter I's title to Arborea and married William's heiress, Benedetta.

In 1221, Peter began ruling alone. In 1228, he allied with the Visconti of Gallura, then allied with Pisa. He was consequently attacked by William II of Cagliari and Marianus II of Torres. They desired to maintain a condominium in Arborea, but internal fighting allowed Peter to solidify his authority with little opposition.

In 1231, Eldiarda, Peter's regent in Bas (Spain), tried to pass the viscounty to her son Simon I of Palau, who married Güeraua d'Anglesola. In 1241, Peter and James I of Aragon finally recognised this new viscount. Peter died that year.

In 1222, he married Diana Visconti, sister of Lambert of Gallura, at the insistence of Ubaldo. Later, he remarried to a woman named Sardinia. By her, he was the father of Marianus II.

== Sources ==
- Nowé, Laura Sannia. Dai "lumi" dalla patria Italiana: Cultura letteraria sarda. Mucchi Editore: Modena, 1996.

| Preceded by Hugh I | Judge of Arborea; 1211–1241 | Succeeded by Marianus II |
