= Elmas =

Elmas Su Masu
- Comune
- Comune di Elmas
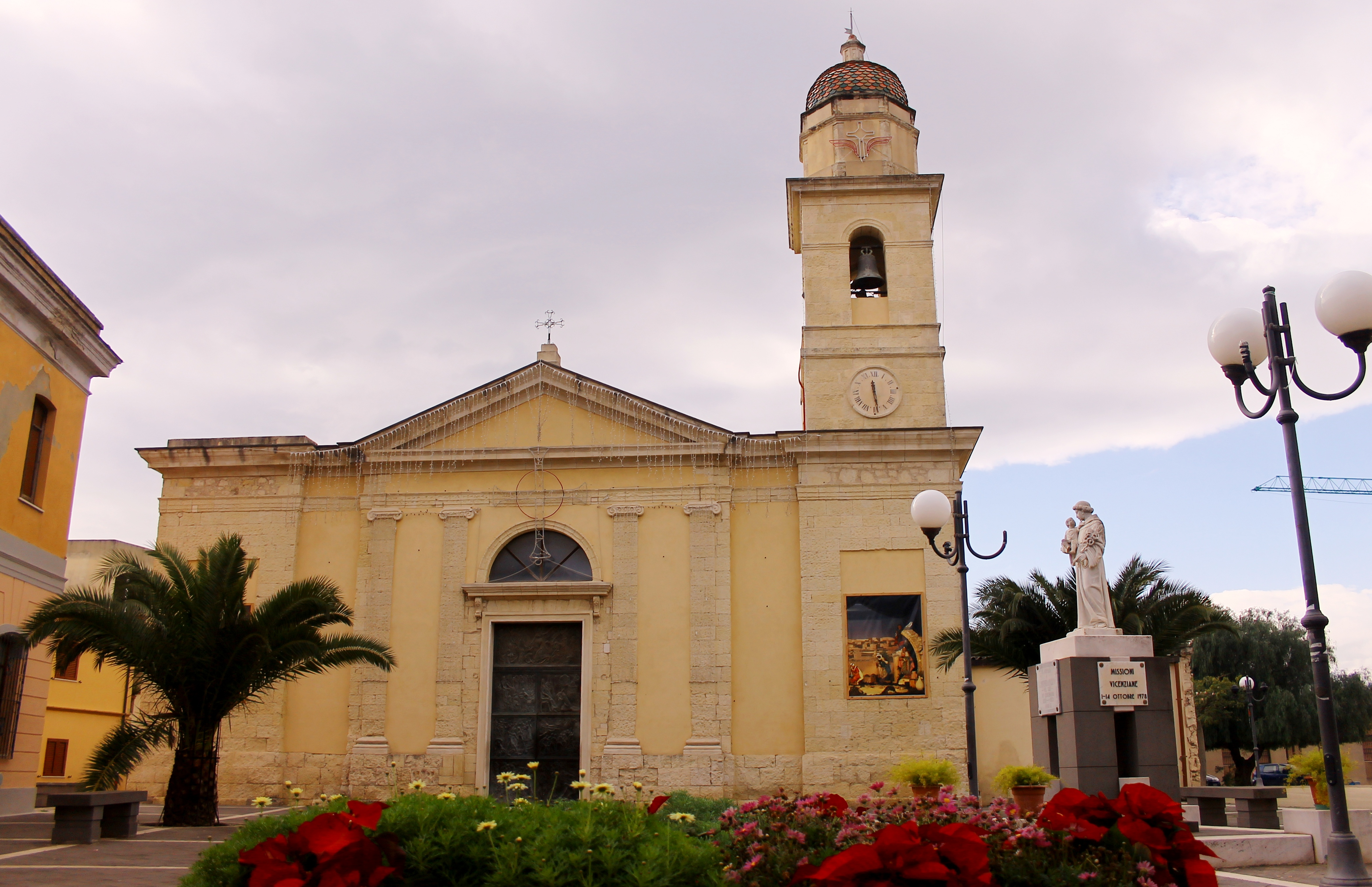
- Church of San Sebastiano

- Coat of arms

- Location within Sardinia
- Coordinates: 39°16′N 9°3′E
- Country: Italy
- Region: Sardinia
- Metropolitan city: Cagliari (CA)

Government
  - Mayor: Maria Laura Orrù

Area
  - Total: 13.72 km^{2} (5.30 sq mi)
- Elevation: 7 m (23 ft)

Population (31 October 2017)
  - Total: 8,222
  - Density: 599.3/km^{2} (1,552/sq mi)
- Demonym: Masesi
- Time zone: UTC+1 (CET)
  - Summer (DST): UTC+2 (CEST)
- Postal code: 09067
- Dialing code: 070
- Patron saint: St. Sebastian
- Saint day: 20 January
- Website: Official website

Elmas (Sardinian: Su Masu) is a comune (municipality) of the Metropolitan City of Cagliari in the Italian region of Sardinia, located about 8 kilometres (5 mi) northwest of Cagliari.

Until 1989 Elmas was a district of Cagliari. It is best known locally as the location for the airport which serves Cagliari, some 7 kilometres (4 mi) to the east to the town. According to 2011 census, it has 8,949 inhabitants.

== Climate ==
Elmas has a hot-summer Mediterranean climate (Köppen: Csa) with summers being very hot and dry and winter mild and humid, associated with high subtropical pressure. The snow turns out to be a rare phenomenon, unlike mountains not so distant. Its precipitation values also bring it closer to semi-arid conditions.

Climate data for Elmas-Cagliari (Elmas Airport), elevation: 5 m or 16 ft, 1981–2010 normals and extremes
Month	Jan	Feb	Mar	Apr	May	Jun	Jul	Aug	Sep	Oct	Nov	Dec	Year
Record high °C (°F)	21.0 (69.8)	22.4 (72.3)	26.2 (79.2)	29.0 (84.2)	34.6 (94.3)	39.0 (102.2)	43.6 (110.5)	41.4 (106.5)	35.4 (95.7)	31.8 (89.2)	26.4 (79.5)	23.4 (74.1)	43.6 (110.5)
Mean daily maximum °C (°F)	14.4 (57.9)	15.0 (59.0)	17.1 (62.8)	19.5 (67.1)	23.8 (74.8)	28.2 (82.8)	31.4 (88.5)	31.7 (89.1)	27.9 (82.2)	23.7 (74.7)	18.8 (65.8)	15.5 (59.9)	22.3 (72.1)
Daily mean °C (°F)	9.9 (49.8)	10.2 (50.4)	12.1 (53.8)	14.5 (58.1)	18.4 (65.1)	22.5 (72.5)	25.6 (78.1)	25.9 (78.6)	22.7 (72.9)	18.9 (66.0)	14.3 (57.7)	11.1 (52.0)	17.2 (63.0)
Mean daily minimum °C (°F)	5.4 (41.7)	5.5 (41.9)	7.2 (45.0)	9.4 (48.9)	13.1 (55.6)	16.8 (62.2)	19.7 (67.5)	20.2 (68.4)	17.5 (63.5)	14.1 (57.4)	9.9 (49.8)	6.8 (44.2)	12.2 (54.0)
Record low °C (°F)	−4.8 (23.4)	−3.0 (26.6)	−2.2 (28.0)	−0.4 (31.3)	4.8 (40.6)	8.8 (47.8)	11.8 (53.2)	12.6 (54.7)	9.0 (48.2)	5.0 (41.0)	−2.0 (28.4)	−3.4 (25.9)	−4.8 (23.4)
Average precipitation mm (inches)	40.7 (1.60)	40.4 (1.59)	33.6 (1.32)	42.2 (1.66)	20.7 (0.81)	10.0 (0.39)	3.1 (0.12)	7.5 (0.30)	35.7 (1.41)	49.1 (1.93)	62.7 (2.47)	49.6 (1.95)	395.3 (15.55)
Average precipitation days (≥ 1.0 mm)	7	6	6	7	4	2	1	1	5	6	8	8	61
Average relative humidity (%)	79	77	75	73	71	67	65	65	71	77	79	80	73
Mean monthly sunshine hours	150	163	209	218	270	311	342	321	243	209	150	127	2,726
Source: Meteo Climat, Servizio Meteorologico and WeatherBase

Climate data for Elmas-Cagliari (Elmas Airport), elevation: 5 m or 16 ft, 1971-2000 normals (Note: Except sunshine hours)
Month	Jan	Feb	Mar	Apr	May	Jun	Jul	Aug	Sep	Oct	Nov	Dec	Year
Mean daily maximum °C (°F)	14.3 (57.7)	14.8 (58.6)	16.5 (61.7)	18.6 (65.5)	22.9 (73.2)	27.3 (81.1)	30.4 (86.7)	30.8 (87.4)	27.4 (81.3)	23.1 (73.6)	18.3 (64.9)	15.4 (59.7)	21.7 (71.1)
Daily mean °C (°F)	9.9 (49.8)	10.3 (50.5)	11.8 (53.2)	13.8 (56.8)	17.7 (63.9)	21.8 (71.2)	24.7 (76.5)	25.2 (77.4)	22.3 (72.1)	18.4 (65.1)	13.8 (56.8)	11.0 (51.8)	16.7 (62.1)
Mean daily minimum °C (°F)	5.5 (41.9)	5.8 (42.4)	7.1 (44.8)	8.9 (48.0)	12.4 (54.3)	16.2 (61.2)	18.9 (66.0)	19.6 (67.3)	17.1 (62.8)	13.7 (56.7)	9.3 (48.7)	6.6 (43.9)	11.8 (53.2)
Average precipitation mm (inches)	49.7 (1.96)	53.3 (2.10)	40.4 (1.59)	39.7 (1.56)	26.1 (1.03)	11.9 (0.47)	4.1 (0.16)	7.5 (0.30)	34.9 (1.37)	52.6 (2.07)	58.4 (2.30)	48.9 (1.93)	428 (16.9)
Average precipitation days (≥ 1.0 mm)	6.8	6.8	6.8	7.0	4.4	2.1	0.8	1.3	4.3	6.5	7.4	7.4	61.6
Mean monthly sunshine hours	136.4	139.2	186.0	213.0	269.7	288.0	334.8	310.0	246.0	198.4	147.0	127.1	2,596
Source: Servizio Meteorologico and Hong Kong Observatory (sunshine hours)
