= Viscounty of Bas =

Feudal Catalan county

The Viscounty of Besalú, or Bas (from the Latin Basso), was the sub-comital authority in the county of Besalú during the Middle Ages. It was ruled by the House of Cervera (also called Cerveró(n) or Cervelló(n), from the Latin Cervaria).

Circa 1293, during disputes with Ponç Hug IV, Count of Empúries, James II of Aragon first seized the viscounty, allowing Hugh V of Bas to buy it back, partially with Hug's aid against James II of Majorca. James seized it again in 1300 and 1315. In 1353, Peter IV of Aragon awarded the viscounty to the House of Cabrera.

== Counts ==
- Bernard I, circa 986
- Huguet, circa 1000
- Udalard I, 1079–1115
- Udalard II, 1115–1123
- Peter I, 1123–1127
- Beatrice, 1127–1142
  - Ponce I Hugh, 1127–1130, husband
- Peter II, c. 1130–1140 (associat 1130–1140)
- Ponce II, 1140–1155 (associat 1140–1142)
- Hugh I, 1155–1185
- Ponce III, regent 1185–1195
- Peter III, regent 1195–1198
- Hugh II, 1198 (nominally 1185–1221)
- Hugh III, regent 1198–1220
- Peter IV, 1221–1241
  - Eldiarda, regent 1220–1231
- Simon, 1231–1247 (until 1241 as regent)
- Sibylla, 1247–1280
- Hugh IV, 1262–1277, husband
- Peter V, 1280–1285, also King of Aragon
- Ponce IV, 1285–1291
- Hugh V, 1291–1300
- confiscated by the crown, 1300–1315
- Ponce V, 1315–1322
- Raymond, 1322–1331
- briefly to the crown, 1331
- Hugh VI, 1331–1335
- Bernard II, 1335–1354
- contested by the crown, 1335–1352
- Bernard III, 1354–1368
- to the crown, 1368–1381
- to the Cabrera, 1381–1756
