= Sardinian language =

Romance language indigenous to the island of Sardinia

Sardinian
- Sard, Sardo
- sardu; limba / lìngua sarda
- Pronunciation: [ˈsaɾdu]
- Native to: Italy
- Region: Sardinia
- Ethnicity: Sardinians
- Native speakers: 1 million (2010, 2016)
- Language family: Indo-European: Italic; Latino-Faliscan; Latin; Romance; Southern Romance; Sardinian
- Early forms: Old Latin: Vulgar Latin; Proto-Romance
- Standard forms: written Limba Sarda Comuna; written Logudorese Sardinian (sardu logudoresu); written Campidanese Sardinian (sardu campidanesu)

Official status
- Recognised minority language in: Italy (1999): Sardinia (1997, 2018)
- Regulated by: Logudorese orthography; Campidanese orthography; Limba Sarda Comuna (inclusive orthographic code)

Language codes
- ISO 639-1: sc
- ISO 639-2: srd
- ISO 639-3: srd – inclusive code Sardinian; Individual codes: sro – Campidanese Sardinian src – Logudorese Sardinian
- Glottolog: sard1257
- Linguasphere: 51-AAA-s
- Sardinian is classified as Definitely Endangered by the UNESCO Atlas of the World's Languages in Danger.

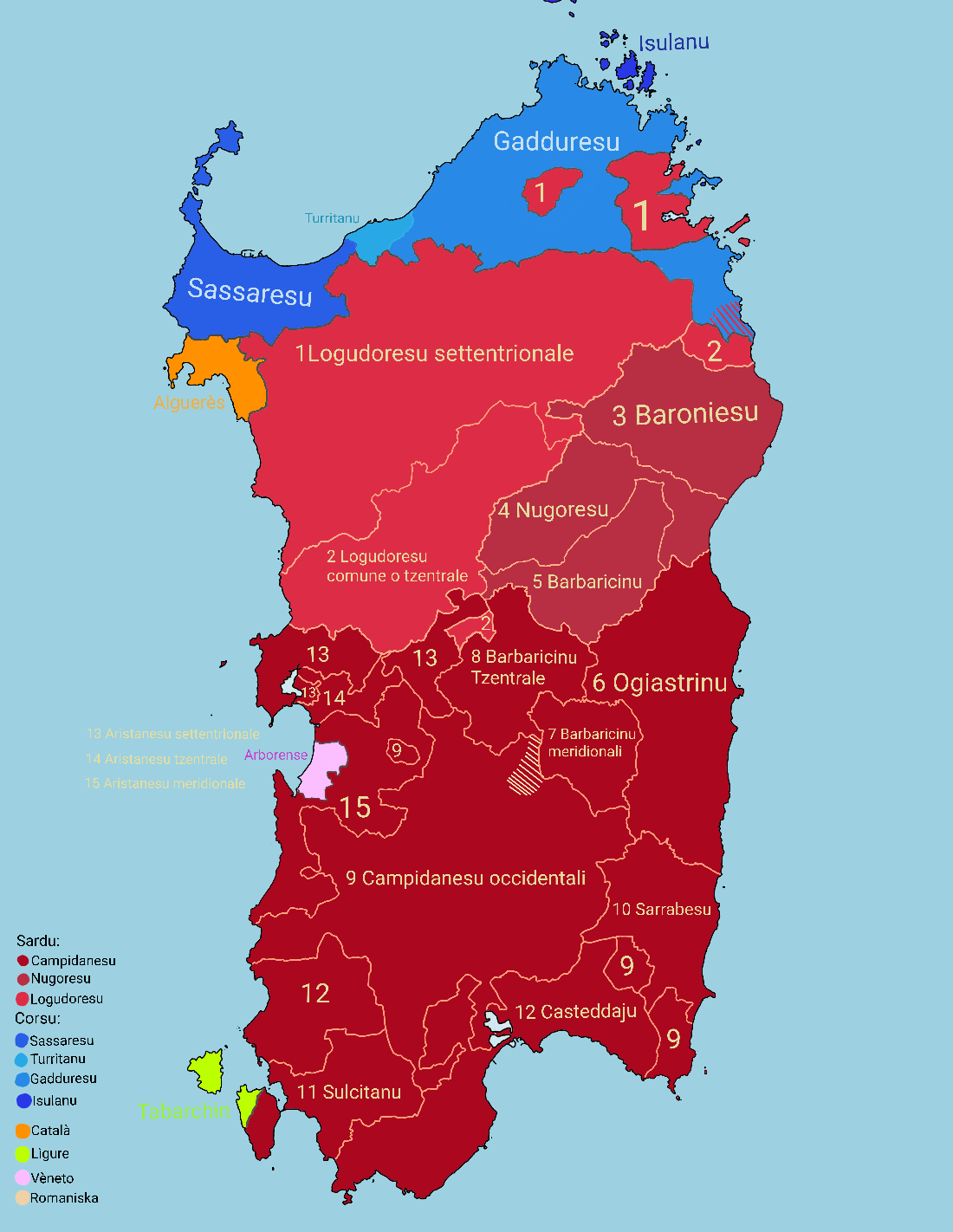
- Linguistic map of Sardinia. Sardinian is light red (sardu logudoresu dialects) and dark red (sardu campidanesu dialects).

Non-native speaker of the Nuorese dialect of Siniscola

Sardinian or Sard is a Romance language spoken by the Sardinians on the Italian Mediterranean island of Sardinia.

The distinctive character of the Sardinian language among the Romance languages has long been known among linguists. Many Romance linguists consider it, together with Italian, as the language that is the closest to Latin among all of Latin's descendants. However, it has also incorporated elements of Pre-Latin (mostly Paleo-Sardinian and, to a much lesser degree, Punic) substratum, as well as a Byzantine Greek, Catalan, Spanish, French, and Italian superstratum. These elements originate in the political history of Sardinia, whose indigenous society experienced competition and, at times, conflict with a series of colonizing newcomers.

Following the end of the Roman Empire in Western Europe, Sardinia passed through periods of successive control by the Vandals, Byzantines, local Judicates, the Kingdom of Aragon, the Savoyard state, and finally Italy. These regimes varied in their usage of Sardinian as against other languages. For example, under the Judicates, Sardinian was used in administrative documents. Under Aragonese control, Catalan and Castilian became the island's prestige languages, and would remain so well into the 18th century. More recently, Italy's linguistic policies have encouraged diglossia, reducing the predominance of both Sardinian and Catalan.

== Information about control and usage ==
After a long strife for the acknowledgement of the island's cultural patrimony, in 1997, Sardinian, along with the other languages spoken therein, managed to be recognized by regional law in Sardinia without challenge by the central government. In 1999, Sardinian and eleven other "historical linguistic minorities", i.e. locally indigenous, and not foreign-grown, minority languages of Italy (minoranze linguistiche storiche, as defined by the legislator) were similarly recognized as such by national law (specifically, Law No. 482/1999). Among these, Sardinian is notable as having, in terms of absolute numbers, the largest community of speakers.

Although the Sardinian-speaking community can be said to share "a high level of linguistic awareness", policies eventually fostering language loss and assimilation have considerably affected Sardinian, whose actual speakers have become noticeably reduced in numbers over the last century. The Sardinian adult population today primarily uses Italian, and less than 15 percent of the younger generations were reported to have been passed down some residual Sardinian, usually in a deteriorated form described by linguist Roberto Bolognesi as "an ungrammatical slang".

The rather fragile and precarious state in which the Sardinian language now finds itself, where its use has been discouraged and consequently reduced even within the family sphere, is illustrated by the Euromosaic report, in which Sardinian "is in 43rd place in the ranking of the 50 languages taken into consideration and of which were analysed (a) use in the family, (b) cultural reproduction, (c) use in the community, (d) prestige, (e) use in institutions, (f) use in education".

As the Sardinians have been almost completely assimilated into the Italian national mores, including in terms of onomastics, and therefore now only happen to keep but a scant and fragmentary knowledge of their native and once first spoken language, limited in both scope and frequency of use, Sardinian has been classified by UNESCO as "definitely endangered". In fact, the intergenerational chain of transmission appears to have been broken since at least the 1960s, in such a way that the younger generations, who are predominantly Italian monolinguals, do not identify themselves with the indigenous tongue, which is now reduced to the memory of "little more than the language of their grandparents".

As the long- to even medium-term future of the Sardinian language looks far from secure in the present circumstances, Martin Harris concluded in 2003 that, assuming the continuation of present trends to language death, it was possible that there would not be a Sardinian language of which to speak in the future, being referred to by linguists as the mere substratum of the now-prevailing idiom, i.e. Italian articulated in its own Sardinian-influenced variety, which may come to wholly supplant the islanders' once living native tongue.

== Overview ==
Now the question arises as to whether Sardinian is to be considered a dialect or a language. Politically speaking, of course, it is one of the many dialects of Italy, just like the Serbo-Croatian and the Albanian that are spoken in various Calabrian and Sicilian villages. The question, however, takes on a different nature when considered from a linguistic perspective. Sardinian cannot be said to be closely related to any dialect of mainland Italy; it is an archaic Romance tongue with its own distinctive characteristics, which can be seen in its rather unique vocabulary as well as its morphology and syntax, which differ radically from those of the Italian dialects.

— Max Leopold Wagner

As an insular language par excellence, Sardinian is considered the most conservative Romance language, as well as one of the most highly individual within the family; its substratum (Paleo-Sardinian or Nuragic) has also been researched. In the first written testimonies, dating to the eleventh century, Sardinian appears as a language already distinct from the dialects of Italy.

A 1949 study by the Italian-American linguist Mario Pei, analyzing the degree to which seven Romance languages diverged from Classical Latin with respect to their accent vocalization, yielded the following measurements of divergence (with higher percentages indicating greater divergence from the stressed vowels of Classical Latin): Logudorese Sardinian 8%, Italian 12%, Spanish 20%, Romanian 23.5%, Occitan 25%, Portuguese 31%, and French 44%. The study emphasized, however, that it represented only "a very elementary, incomplete and tentative demonstration" of how statistical methods could measure linguistic change, assigned "frankly arbitrary" point values to various types of change, and did not compare languages in the sample with respect to any characteristics or forms of divergence other than stressed vowels, among other caveats.

The significant degree to which the Sardinian language has retained its Latin base was also noted by the French geographer Maurice Le Lannou during a research project on the island in 1941.

Chart of Romance languages based on structural and comparative criteria (not on socio-functional ones)

Although its lexical base is mostly of Latin origin, Sardinian nonetheless retains a number of traces of the linguistic substratum predating the Roman conquest of the island: several words and especially toponyms stem from Paleo-Sardinian and, to a lesser extent, Phoenician-Punic. These etyma might refer to an early Mediterranean substratum, which reveal close relations with Basque.

In addition to the aforementioned substratum, linguists such as Max Leopold Wagner and Benvenuto Aronne Terracini trace much of the distinctive Latin character of Sardinia to the languoids once spoken by the Christian and Jewish Berbers in North Africa, known as African Romance. Indeed, Sardinian was perceived as rather similar to African Latin when the latter was still in use, giving credit to the theory that vulgar Latin in both Africa and Sardinia displayed a significant wealth of parallelisms. J. N. Adams is of the opinion that similarities in many words, such as acina ('grape'), pala ('shoulder blade') and spanu(s) ('reddish-brown'), prove that there might have been a fair amount of vocabulary shared between Sardinia and Africa. According to Wagner, it is notable that Sardinian is the only Romance language whose name for the Milky Way ((b)ía de sa báza, (b)ía de sa bálla, 'the Way of Straw') also recurs in the Berber languages.

To most Italians Sardinian is unintelligible, reminding them of Spanish, because of the way in which the language is acoustically articulated; characterized as it is by a sharply outlined physiognomy which is displayed from the earliest sources available, it is in fact considered a distinct language, if not an altogether different branch, among the Romance idioms; George Bossong summarises thus: "be this as it may, from a strictly linguistic point of view there can be no doubt that Sardinian is to be classified as an independent Romance language, or even as an independent branch inside the family, and so it is classed alongside the great national languages like French and Italian in all modern manuals of Romance linguistics".

== History ==
Sardinia's relative isolation from mainland Europe encouraged the development of a Romance language that preserves traces of its indigenous, pre-Roman language(s). The language is posited to have substratal influences from Paleo-Sardinian, which some scholars have linked to Basque and Etruscan; comparisons have also been drawn with the Berber languages from North Africa to shed more light on the language(s) spoken in Sardinia prior to its Romanization. Subsequent adstratal influences include Catalan, Spanish, and Italian. The situation of the Sardinian language with regard to the politically dominant ones did not change until fascism and, most evidently, the 1950s.

=== Origins of modern Sardinian ===
Prenuragic and Nuragic era

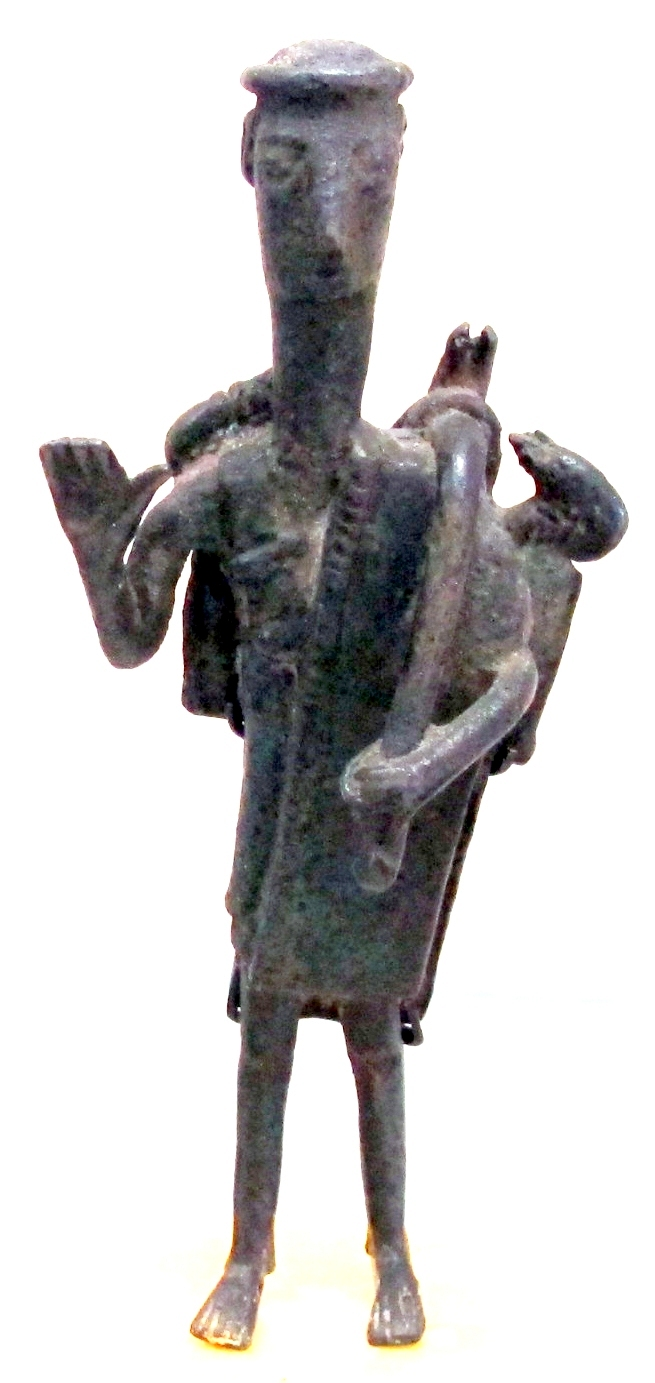
Hunter, Nuragic bronze statuette

The origins of ancient Sardinian, also known as Paleo-Sardinian, are currently unknown. Research has attempted to discover obscure, indigenous, pre-Romance roots. The root s(a)rd, indicating many place names as well as the island's people, is reportedly either associated with or originating from the Sherden, one of the Sea Peoples. Other sources trace instead the root s(a)rd from Σαρδώ, a legendary woman from the Anatolian Kingdom of Lydia, or from the Libyan mythological figure of the Sardus Pater Babai ("Sardinian Father" or "Father of the Sardinians").

In 1984, Massimo Pittau claimed to have found the etymology of many Latin words in the Etruscan language, after comparing it with the Nuragic language(s). Etruscan elements, formerly thought to have originated in Latin, would indicate a connection between the ancient Sardinian culture and the Etruscans. According to Pittau, the Etruscan and Nuragic language(s) are descended from Lydian (and therefore Indo-European) as a consequence of contact with Etruscans and other Tyrrhenians from Sardis as described by Herodotus. Although Pittau suggests that the Tirrenii landed in Sardinia and the Etruscans landed in modern Tuscany, his views are not shared by most Etruscologists.

According to Bertoldi and Terracini, Paleo-Sardinian has similarities with the Iberic languages and Siculian; for example, the suffix -ara in proparoxytones indicated the plural. Terracini proposed the same for suffixes in -/àna/, -/ànna/, -/énna/, -/ònna/ + /r/ + a paragogic vowel (such as the toponym Bunnànnaru). Rohlfs, Butler and Craddock add the suffix -/ini/ (such as the toponym Barùmini) as a unique element of Paleo-Sardinian. Suffixes in /a, e, o, u/ + -rr- found a correspondence in north Africa (Terracini), in Iberia (Blasco Ferrer) and in southern Italy and Gascony (Rohlfs), with a closer relationship to Basque (Wagner and Hubschmid). However, these early links to a Basque precursor have been questioned by some Basque linguists. According to Terracini, suffixes in -/ài/, -/éi/, -/òi/, and -/ùi/ are common to Paleo-Sardinian and northern African languages. Pittau emphasized that this concerns terms originally ending in an accented vowel, with an attached paragogic vowel; the suffix resisted Latinization in some place names, which show a Latin body and a Nuragic suffix. According to Bertoldi, some toponyms ending in -/ài/ and -/asài/ indicated an Anatolian influence. The suffix -/aiko/, widely used in Iberia and possibly of Celtic origin, and the ethnic suffix in -/itanos/ and -/etanos/ (for example, the Sardinian Sulcitanos) have also been noted as Paleo-Sardinian elements (Terracini, Ribezzo, Wagner, Hubschmid and Faust).

Some linguists, like Max Leopold Wagner (1931), Blasco Ferrer (2009, 2010) and Arregi (2017) have attempted to revive a theoretical connection with Basque by linking words such as Sardinian idile 'marshland' and Basque itil 'puddle'; Sardinian ospile 'fresh grazing for cattle' and Basque hozpil 'cool, fresh'; Sardinian arrotzeri 'vagabond' and Basque arrotz 'stranger'; Sardinian golostiu and Basque gorosti 'holly'; Gallurese (Corso-Sardinian) zerru 'pig' (with z for [dz]) and Basque zerri (with z for [s]). Genetic data have found the Basques to be close to the Sardinians.

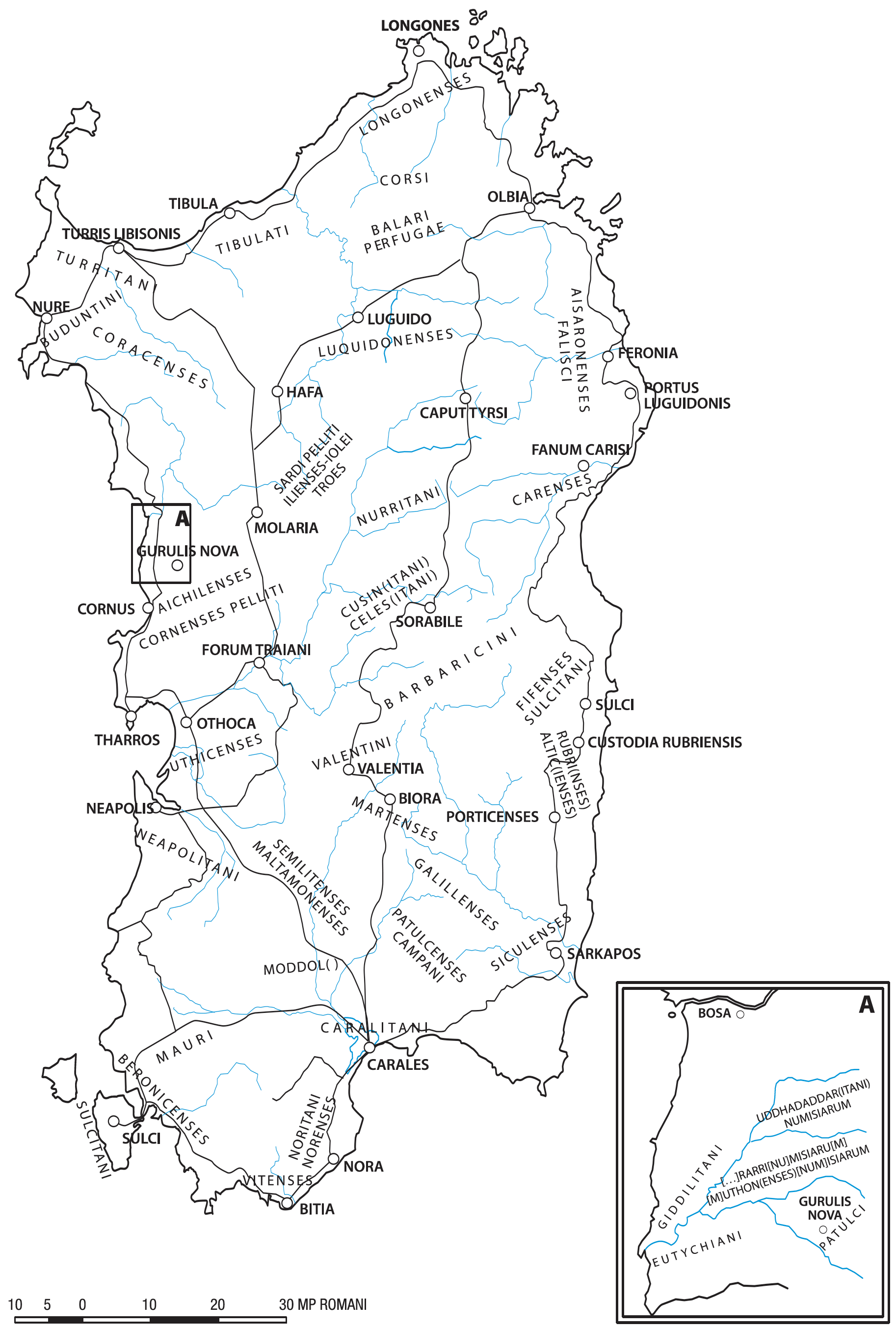
Location of the Sardinian tribes, as described by the Roman sources

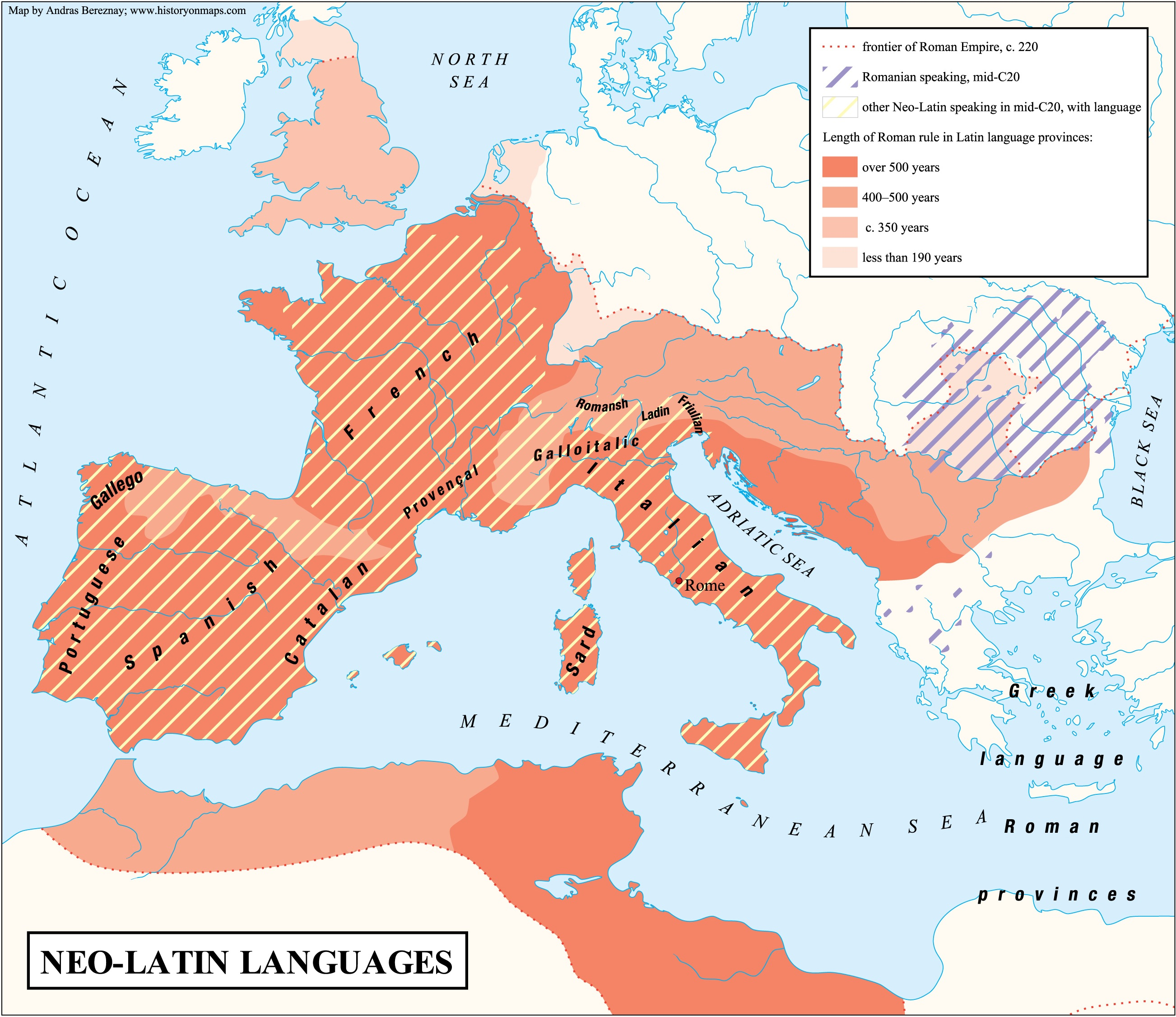
Length of the Roman rule and emergence of the Romance languages

Since the Neolithic period, some degree of variance across the island's regions is also attested. The Arzachena culture, for instance, suggests a link between the northernmost Sardinian region (Gallura) and southern Corsica that finds further confirmation in the Natural History by Pliny the Elder. There are also some stylistic differences across Northern and Southern Nuragic Sardinia, which may indicate the existence of two other tribal groups (Balares and Ilienses) mentioned by the same Roman author. According to the archeologist Giovanni Ugas, these tribes may have in fact played a role in shaping the current regional linguistic differences of the island.

Classical period

Around the 10th and 9th century BC, Phoenician merchants were known to have made their presence in Sardinia, which acted as a geographical mediator in between the Iberian and the Italian peninsula. In the eighth and seventh centuries, the Phoenicians began to develop permanent settlements, politically arranged as city-states in similar fashion to the Lebanese coastal areas. It did not take long before they started gravitating around the Carthaginian sphere of influence, whose level of prosperity spurred Carthage to send a series of expeditionary forces to the island; although they were initially repelled by the natives, the North African city vigorously pursued a policy of active imperialism and, by the sixth century, managed to establish its political hegemony and military control over South-Western Sardinia. Punic began to be spoken in the area, and many words entered ancient Sardinian as well. Words like giara 'plateau' (cf. Hebrew yaʿar 'forest, scrub'), g(r)uspinu 'nasturtium' (from Punic cusmin), curma 'fringed rue' (cf. Arabic ḥarmal 'Syrian rue'), mítza 'spring' (cf. Hebrew mitsa, metza 'source, fountainhead'), síntziri 'marsh horsetail' (from Punic zunzur 'common knotgrass'), tzeúrra 'sprout' (from *zerula, diminutive of Punic zeraʿ 'seed'), tzichirìa 'dill' (from Punic sikkíria; cf. Hebrew šēkār 'ale') and tzípiri 'rosemary' (from Punic zibbir) are commonly used, especially in the modern Sardinian varieties of the Campidanese plain, while proceeding northwards the influence is more limited to place names, such as the town of Magomadas, Macumadas in Nuoro or Magumadas in Gesico and Nureci, all of which deriving from the Punic maqom hadash 'new city'.

The Roman domination began in 238 BC, but was often contested by the local Sardinian tribes, who had by then acquired a high level of political organization, and would manage to only partly supplant the pre-Latin Sardinian languages, including Punic. Although the colonists and negotiatores (businessmen) of strictly Italic descent would later play a relevant role in introducing and spreading Latin to Sardinia, Romanisation proved slow to take hold among the Sardinian natives, whose proximity to the Carthaginian cultural influence was noted by Roman authors. Punic continued to be spoken well into the 3rd–4th century AD, as attested by votive inscriptions, and it is thought that the natives from the most interior areas, led by the tribal chief Hospito, joined their brethren in making the switch to Latin around the 7th century AD, through their conversion to Christianity. (Note: Pope Symmachus (498–514 C.E.), a Sardinian by birth, described himself as ex paganitate veniens, "coming from a pagan land". Gregory the Great (590–614 C.E.) reproached the people of Barbagia for still worshipping stone and wooden idols (Wagner 1951: 73).) Cicero, who loathed the Sardinians on the ground of numerous factors, such as their outlandish language, their kinship with Carthage and their refusal to engage with Rome, would call the Sardinian rebels latrones mastrucati ('thieves with rough wool cloaks') or Afri ('Africans') to emphasize Roman superiority over a population mocked as the refuse of Carthage. (Note: "Fallacissimum genus esse Phoenicum omnia monumenta vetustatis atque omnes historiae nobis prodiderunt. ab his orti Poeni multis Carthaginiensium rebellionibus, multis violatis fractisque foederibus nihil se degenerasse docuerunt. A Poenis admixto Afrorum genere Sardi non deducti in Sardiniam atque ibi constituti, sed amandati et repudiati coloni. [...] Neque ego, cum de vitiis gentis loquor, neminem excipio; sed a me est de universo genere dicendum, in quo fortasse aliqui suis moribus et humanitate stirpis ipsius et gentis vitia vicerunt. magnam quidem esse partem sine fide, sine societate et coniunctione nominis nostri res ipsa declarat. quae est enim praeter Sardiniam provincia quae nullam habeat amicam populo Romano ac liberam civitatem? Africa ipsa parens illa Sardiniae, quae plurima et acerbissima cum maioribus nostris bella gessit." "Cicero: Pro Scauro". ("All the monuments of the ancients and all histories have handed down to us the tradition that the nation of the Phoenicians is the most treacherous of all nations. The Poeni, who are descended from them, have proved by many rebellions of the Carthaginians, and very many broken and violated treaties, that they have in no respect degenerated from them. The Sardinians, who are sprung from the Poeni, with an admixture of African blood, were not led into Sardinia as colonists and established there, but are rather a tribe who were draughted off, and put there to get rid of them. Nor indeed, when I speak of the vices of the nation, do I except no one. But I am forced to speak generally of the entire race; in which, perhaps, some individuals by their own civilized habits and natural humanity have got the better of the vices of their family and nation. That the greater part of the nation is destitute of faith, destitute of any community and connection with our name, the facts themselves plainly show. For what province is there besides Sardinia which has not one city in it on friendly terms with the Roman people, not one free city? Africa itself is the parent of Sardinia, which has waged many most bitter wars against our ancestors." Translation by C. D. Yonge, B. A. London. Henry G. Bohn, York Street, Covent Garden. 1856, "Perseus Digital Library".))

A number of obscure Nuragic roots remained unchanged, and in many cases Latin accepted the local roots (like nur, presumably cognate of Norax, which makes its appearance in nuraghe, Nurra, Nurri and many other toponyms). Barbagia, the mountainous central region of the island, derives its name from the Latin Barbaria (a term meaning 'Land of the Barbarians', similar in origin to the now antiquated word Barbary), because its people refused cultural and linguistic assimilation for a long time: 50% of toponyms of central Sardinia, particularly in the territory of Olzai, are actually not related to any known language. According to Terracini, amongst the regions in Europe that went on to draw their language from Latin, Sardinia has overall preserved the highest proportion of pre-Latin toponyms. Besides the place names, on the island there are still a few names of plants, animals and geological formations directly traceable to the ancient Nuragic era.

By the end of the Roman domination, Latin had gradually become however the speech of most of the island's inhabitants. As a result of this protracted and prolonged process of Romanisation, the modern Sardinian language is today classified as Romance or neo-Latin, with some phonetic features resembling Old Latin. Some linguists assert that modern Sardinian, being part of the Island Romance group, was the first language to split off from Latin, all others evolving from Latin as Continental Romance. In fact, contact with Rome might have ceased from as early as the first century BC. In terms of vocabulary, Sardinian retains an array of peculiar Latin-based forms that are either unfamiliar to, or have altogether disappeared in, the rest of the Romance-speaking world.

The number of Latin inscriptions on the island is relatively small and fragmented. Some engraved poems in ancient Greek and Latin (the two most prestigious languages in the Roman Empire) are seen in the so-called "Viper's Cave" (Gruta 'e sa Pibera in Sardinian, Grotta della Vipera in Italian, Cripta Serpentum in Latin), a burial monument built in Caralis (Cagliari) by Lucius Cassius Philippus (a Roman who had been exiled to Sardinia) in remembrance of his dead spouse Atilia Pomptilla; we also have some religious works by Eusebius and Saint Lucifer, both from Caralis and in the writing style of whom may be noted the lexicon and perifrastic forms typical of Sardinian (e.g. narrare in place of dicere; compare with Sardinian nàrrere or nàrri(ri) 'to say').

After a period of 80 years under the Vandals, Sardinia would again be part of the Byzantine Empire under the Exarchate of Africa for almost another five centuries. Luigi Pinelli believes that the Vandal presence had "estranged Sardinia from Europe, linking its own destiny to Africa's territorial expanse" in a bond that was to strengthen further "under Byzantine rule, not only because the Roman Empire included the island in the African Exarchate, but also because it developed from there, albeit indirectly, its ethnic community, causing it to acquire many of the African characteristics" that would allow ethnologists and historians to elaborate the theory of the Paleo-Sardinians' supposed African origin, now disproved. Casula is convinced that the Vandal domination caused a "clear breaking with the Roman-Latin writing tradition or, at the very least, an appreciable bottleneck" so that the subsequent Byzantine government was able to establish "its own operational institutions" in a "territory disputed between the Greek- and the Latin-speaking world".

Despite a period of almost five centuries, the Greek language only lent Sardinian a few ritual and formal expressions using Greek structure and, sometimes, the Greek alphabet. Evidence for this is found in the condaghes, the first written documents in Sardinian. From the long Byzantine era there are only a few entries but they already provide a glimpse of the sociolinguistical situation on the island in which, in addition to the community's everyday Neo-Latin language, Greek was also spoken by the ruling classes. Some toponyms, such as Jerzu (thought to derive from the Greek khérsos, 'untilled'), together with the personal names Mikhaleis, Konstantine and Basilis, demonstrate Greek influence.

=== Judicates period ===
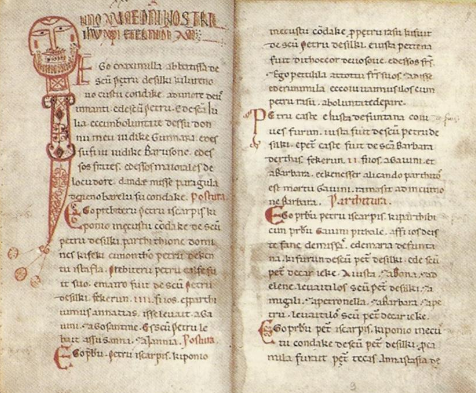
The condaghe of Saint Peter of Silki (1065–1180) (University Public Library of Sassari)

As the Muslims made their way into North Africa, what remained of the Byzantine possession of the Exarchate of Africa was only the Balearic Islands and Sardinia. Pinelli believes that this event constituted a fundamental watershed in the historical course of Sardinia, leading to the definitive severance of those previously close cultural ties between Sardinia and the southern shore of the Mediterranean: any previously held commonality shared between Sardinia and Africa "disappeared, like mist in the sun, as a result of North Africa's conquest by Islamic forces, since the latter, due to the fierce resistance of the Sardinians, were not able to spread to the island, as they had in Africa". Michele Amari, quoted by Pinelli, writes that "the attempts of the Muslims of Africa to conquer Sardinia and Corsica were frustrated by the unconquered valour of the poor and valiant inhabitants of those islands, who saved themselves for two centuries from the yoke of the Arabs".

As the Byzantines were fully focused on reconquering southern Italy and Sicily, which had in the meanwhile also fallen to the Muslims, their attention on Sardinia was neglected and communications broke down with Constantinople; this spurred the former Byzantine province of Sardinia to become progressively more autonomous from the Byzantine oecumene, and eventually attain independence. Pinelli argues that "the Arab conquest of North Africa separated Sardinia from that continent without, however, causing the latter to rejoin Europe" and that this event "determined a capital turning point for Sardinia, giving rise to a de facto independent national government". Historian Marc Bloch believed that, owing to Sardinia being a country which found itself in "quasi-isolation" from the rest of the continent, the earliest documentary testimonies, written in Sardinian, were much older than those first issued in Italy.

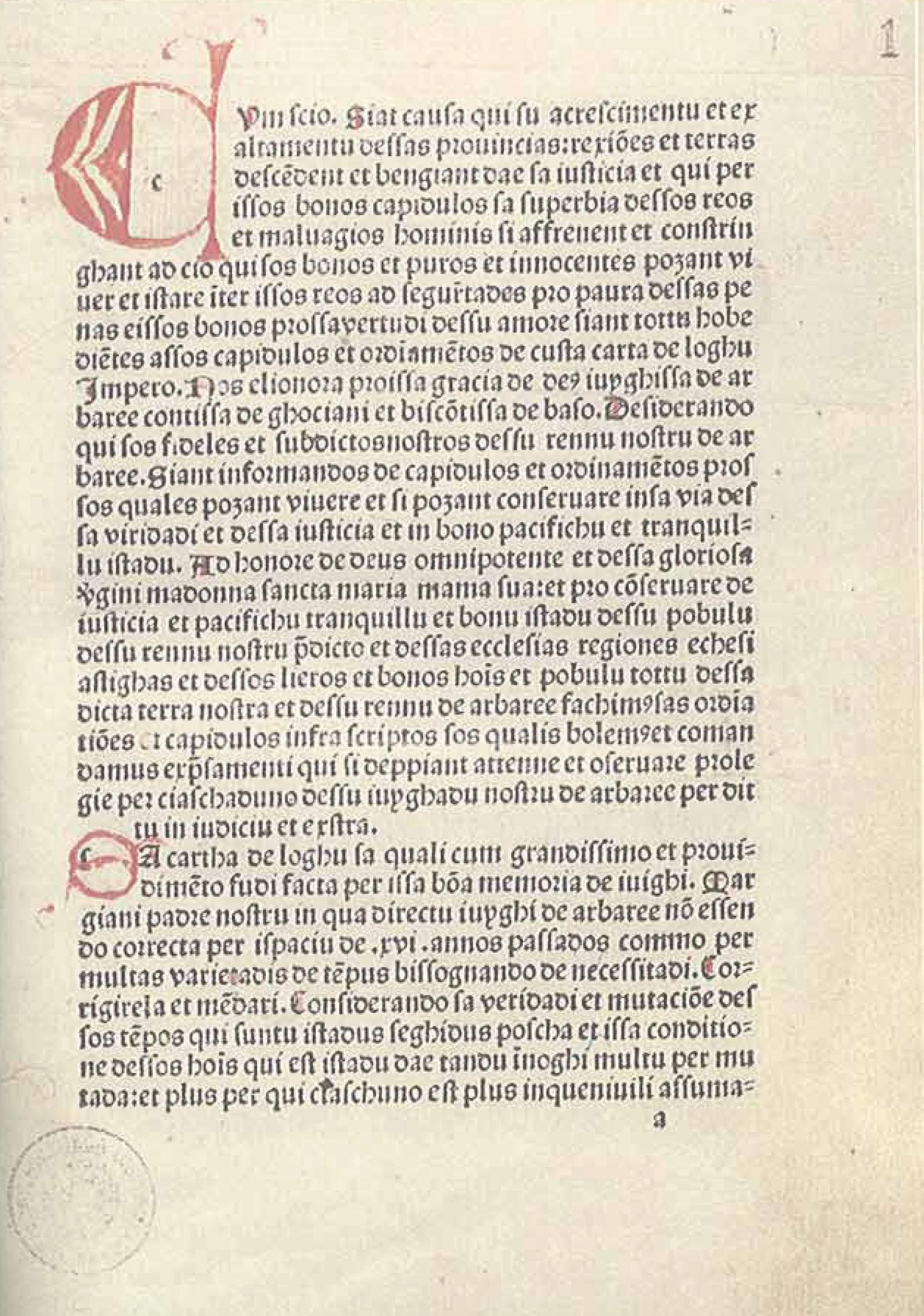
The first page of a copy of the Arborean Carta de Logu (University Public Library of Cagliari)

Sardinian was the first Romance language of all to gain official status, being used by the four Judicates, (Note: As Ludovico Antonio Muratori noted, "Potissimum vero ad usurpandum in scriptis Italicum idioma gentem nostram fuisse adductam puto finitimarum exemplo, Provincialium, Corsorum atque Sardorum" ("In reality, I believe that our people [Italians] have been induced to employ the Italian language for writing by following the example of our neighbours, the Provençals, the Corsicans and the Sardinians") and "Sardorum quoque et Corsorum exemplum memoravi Vulgari sua Lingua utentium, utpote qui Italis preivisse in hoc eodem studio videntur" ("Moreover, I made reference to the example of the Sardinians and the Corsicans, who used their own vulgar language, as being those who preceded the Italians in such regard"). Antonio, Ludovico Antonio (1739). Antiquitates Italicae Moedii Evi, Mediolani, t. 2, col.1049) former Byzantine districts that became independent political entities after the Arab expansion in the Mediterranean had cut off any ties left between the island and Byzantium. The exceptionality of the Sardinian situation, which in this sense constitutes a unique case throughout the Latin-speaking Europe, consists in the fact that any official text was written solely in Sardinian from the very beginning and completely excluded Latin, unlike what was happening – and would continue to happen – in France, Italy and Iberia at the same time; Latin, although co-official, was in fact used only in documents concerning external relations in which the Sardinian kings (judikes, 'judges') engaged. Awareness of the dignity of Sardinian for official purposes was such that, in the words of Livio Petrucci, a Neo-Latin language had come to be used "at a time when nothing similar can be observed in the Italian peninsula" not only "in the legal field" but also "in any other field of writing".

A diplomatic analysis of the earliest Sardinian documents shows that the Judicates provided themselves with chanceries, which employed an indigenous diplomatic model for writing public documents; one of them, dating to 1102, displays text in half-uncial, a script that had long fallen out of use on the European continent and F. Casula believes may have been adopted by the Sardinians of Latin culture as their own "national script" from the 8th until the 12th century, prior to their receiving outside influence from the arrival of mainly Italian notaries.

Extract from Bonarcado's Condaghe, 22 (1120–1146)
"Ego Gregorius, priore de Bonarcadu, partivi cun iudice de Gallulu. Coiuvedi Goantine Mameli, serbu de sancta Maria de Bonarcadu, cun Maria de Lee, ancilla de iudice de Gallul. Fegerunt II fiios: Zipari et Justa. Clesia levait a Zipari et iudice levait a Justa. Testes: Nigola de Pane, Comida Pira, Goantine de Porta, armentariu dessu archipiscobu."

Old Sardinian had a greater number of archaisms and Latinisms than the present language does, with few Germanic words, mostly coming from Latin itself, and even fewer Arabisms, which had been imported by scribes from Iberia; in spite of their best efforts with a score of expeditions to the island, from which they would get considerable booty and a hefty number of Sardinian slaves, the Arab assailants were in fact each time forcefully driven back and would never manage to conquer and settle on the island.

Although the surviving texts come from such disparate areas as the north and the south of the island, Sardinian then presented itself in a rather homogeneous form: even though the orthographic differences between Logudorese and Campidanese Sardinian were beginning to appear, Wagner found in this period "the original unity of the Sardinian language". In agreement with Wagner is Paolo Merci, who found a "broad uniformity" around this period, as were Antonio Sanna and Ignazio Delogu too, for whom it was the islanders' community life that prevented Sardinian from localism. According to Carlo Tagliavini, these earlier documents show the existence of a Sardinian Koine which pointed to a model based on Logudorese.

According to Eduardo Blasco Ferrer, it was in the wake of the fall of the Judicates of Cagliari and Gallura, in the second half of the 13th century, that Sardinian began to fragment into its modern dialects, undergoing some Tuscanization under the rule of the Republic of Pisa; it did not take long before the Genoese too started carving their own sphere of influence in northern Sardinia, both through the mixed Sardinian-Genoese nobility of Sassari and the members of the Doria family. A certain range of dialectal variation is then noted.

A special position was occupied by the Judicate of Arborea, the last Sardinian kingdom to fall to foreign powers, in which a transitional dialect was spoken, that of Middle Sardinian. The Carta de Logu of the Kingdom of Arborea, one of the first constitutions in history drawn up in 1355–1376 by Marianus IV and the Queen, the 'Lady Judge' (Sardinian: judikessa, Catalan: jutgessa, Italian: giudicessa) Eleanor, was written in this transitional variety of Sardinian, and would remain in force until 1827. The Arborean judges' effort to unify the Sardinian dialects were due to their desire to be legitimate rulers of the entire island under a single state (republica sardisca 'Sardinian Republic'); such political goal, after all, was already manifest in 1164, when the Arborean Judge Barison ordered his great seal to be made with the writings Baresonus Dei Gratia Rei Sardiniee ('Barison, by the grace of God, King of Sardinia') and Est vis Sardorum pariter regnum Populorum ('The people's rule is equal to the Sardinians' own force').

Dante Alighieri wrote in his 1302–1305 essay De vulgari eloquentia that Sardinians were strictly speaking not Italians (Latii), even though they appeared superficially similar to them, and they did not speak anything close to a Neo-Latin language of their own (lingua vulgaris), but resorted to aping straightforward Latin instead. Dante's view on the Sardinians, however, is proof of how their language had been following its own course in a way which was already unintelligible to non-islanders, and had become, in Wagner's words, an impenetrable "sphinx" to their judgment. Frequently mentioned is a previous 12th-century poem by the troubadour Raimbaut de Vaqueiras, Domna, tant vos ai preiada ("Lady, so much I have endeared you"); Sardinian epitomizes outlandish speech therein, along with non-Romance languages such as German and Berber, with the troubadour having the lady say "No t'entend plui d'un Todesco / Sardesco o Barbarì" ("I don't understand you more than a German or Sardinian or Berber"); the Tuscan poet Fazio degli Uberti refers to the Sardinians in his poem Dittamondo as "una gente che niuno non-la intende / né essi sanno quel ch'altri pispiglia" ("a people that no one is able to understand / nor do they come to a knowledge of what other peoples say about them").

The Muslim geographer Muhammad al-Idrisi, who lived in Palermo, Sicily at the court of King Roger II, wrote in his work Kitab Nuzhat al-mushtāq fi'khtirāq al-āfāq ('The book of pleasant journeys into faraway lands' or, simply, 'The book of Roger') that "Sardinians are ethnically Rūm Afāriqah, like the Berbers; they shun contacts with all the other Rūm nations and are people of purpose and valiant that never leave the arms". According to Wagner, the close relationship in the development of Vulgar Latin between North Africa and Sardinia might not have only derived from ancient ethnic affinities between the two populations, but also from their common political past within the Exarchate of Africa.

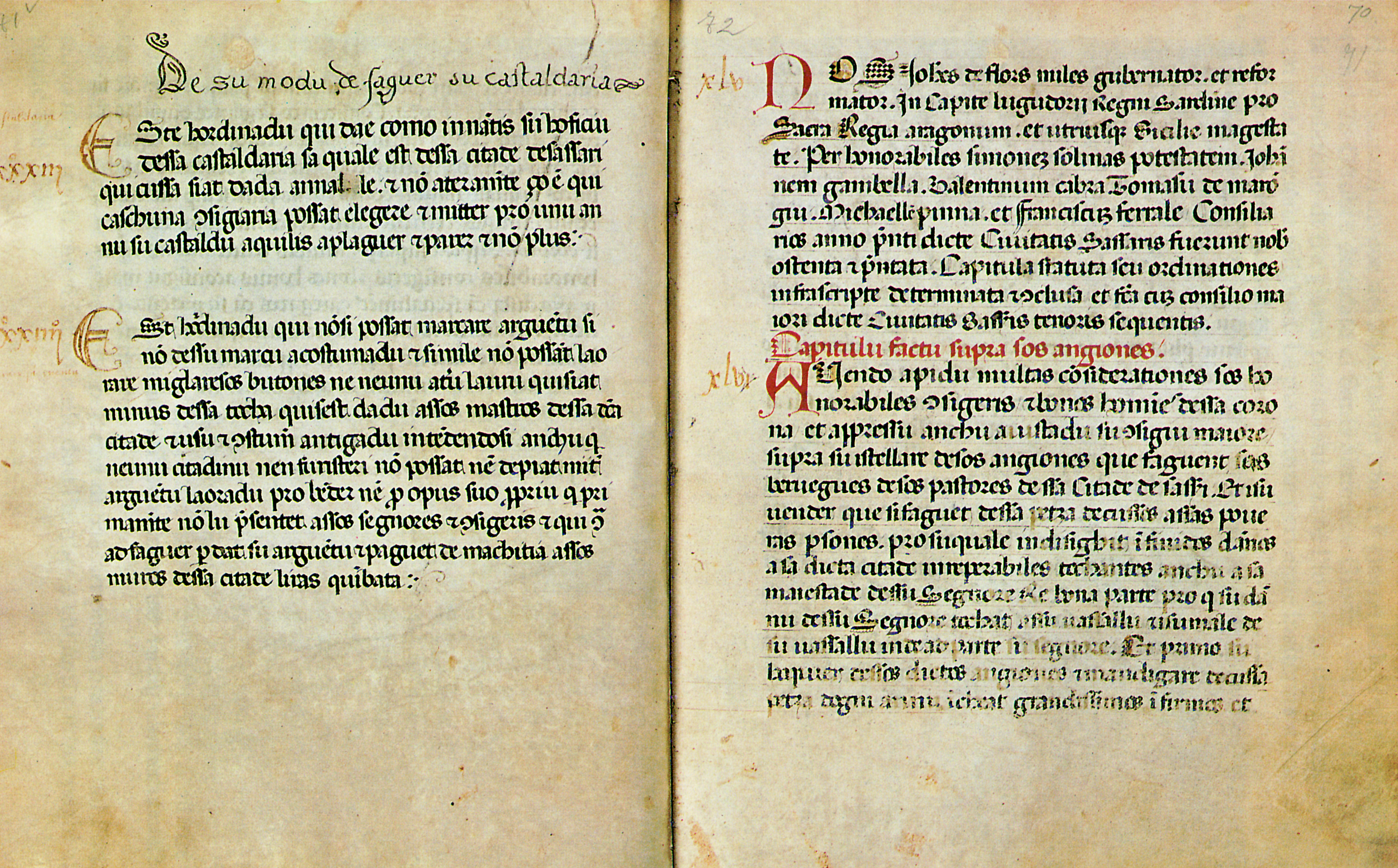
Sardinian-language statutes of Sassari from the 13th–14th centuries

What literature is left to us from this period primarily consists of legal and administrative documents, besides the aforementioned Cartas and condaghes. The first document containing Sardinian elements is a 1063 donation to the abbey of Montecassino signed by Barisone I of Torres. Another such document (the so-called Carta Volgare) comes from the Judicate of Cagliari and was issued by Torchitorio I de Lacon-Gunale in around 1070, written in Sardinian whilst still employing the Greek alphabet. Other documents are the 1080 "Logudorese Privilege", the 1089 Torchitorius' Donation (in the Marseille archives), the 1190–1206 Marsellaise Chart (in Campidanese Sardinian) and an 1173 communication between the Bishop Bernardo of Civita and Benedetto, who oversaw the Opera del Duomo in Pisa. The Statutes of Sassari (1316) and Castelgenovese (c. 1334) are written in Logudorese Sardinian.

The first chronicle in lingua sive ydiomate sardo, called Condagues de Sardina, was published anonymously in the 13th century, relating the events of the Judicate of Torres.

=== Iberian period – Catalan and Castilian influence ===
The 1297 feoffment of Sardinia by Pope Boniface VIII led to the creation of the Kingdom of Sardinia: that is, of a state which, although lacking in summa potestas, entered by right as a member in personal union within the broader Mediterranean structure of the Crown of Aragon, a composite state. Thus began a long war between the latter and, to the cry of Helis, Helis, from 1353, the previously allied Judicate of Arborea, in which the Sardinian language was to play the role of an ethnic marker.

The war had, among its motives, a never dormant and ancient Arborean political design to establish "a great island nation-state, wholly indigenous" which was assisted by the massive participation of the rest of the Sardinians, i.e. those not residing within the jurisdiction of Arborea (Sardus de foras), as well as a widespread impatience with the foreign importation of a feudal regime, specifically "more Italie" and "Cathalonie", which threatened the survival of deep-rooted indigenous institutions and, far from ensuring the return of the island to a unitary regime, had only introduced there "tot reges quot sunt ville" ('as many petty rulers as there are villages'), whereas instead "Sardi unum regem se habuisse credebant" ('the Sardinians believed they had one single king').

The conflict between the two sovereign and warring parties, during which the Aragonese possessions making up the Kingdom of Sardinia were first administratively split into two separate "halves" (capita) by Peter IV the Ceremonious in 1355, ended after sixty-seven years with the Iberian victory at Sanluri in 1409 and the renunciation of any succession right signed by William II of Narbonne in 1420. This event marked the definitive end of Sardinian independence, whose historical relevance for the island, likened by Francesco C. Casula to "the end of Aztec Mexico", should be considered "neither triumph nor defeat, but the painful birth of today's Sardinia".

Any outbreak of anti-Aragonese rebellion, such as the revolt of Alghero in 1353, that of Uras in 1470 and finally that of Macomer in 1478, celebrated in De bello et interitu marchionis Oristanei, were and would have been systematically neutralised. From that moment, "quedó de todo punto Sardeña por el rey".

Casula believes that the Aragonese winners from the brutal conflict would then move on to destroy the pre-existing documentary production of the still living Sardinian Judicate, which was predominantly written in Sardinian language along with other ones the chancery was engaged with, leaving behind their trail only "a few stones" and, overall, a "small group of documents", many of which are in fact still preserved and/or refer to archives outside the island. Specifically, the Arborean documents and the palace in which they were kept would be completely set on fire on May 21, 1478, as the viceroy triumphantly entered Oristano after having tamed the aforementioned 1478 rebellion, which threatened the revival of an Arborean identity which had been de jure abolished in 1420 but was still very much alive in popular memory.

Thereafter, the ruling class in Sardinia proceeded to adopt Catalan as their primary language. The situation in Cagliari, a city subject to Aragonese repopulation and where, according to Giovanni Francesco Fara (Ioannes Franciscus Fara / Juanne Frantziscu Fara), for a time Catalan took over Sardinian as in Alghero, was emblematic, so much so as to later generate idioms such as no scit su catalanu ('he does not know Catalan') to indicate a person who could not express themselves "correctly". Alghero is still a Catalan-speaking enclave on Sardinia to this day. Nevertheless, the Sardinian language did not disappear from official use: the Catalan juridical tradition in the cities coexisted with that of the Sardinians, marked in 1421 by the Parliamentary extension of the Arborean Carta de Logu to the feudal areas during the Reign of King Alfonso the Magnanimous. Fara, in the same first modern monograph dedicated to Sardinia, reported the lively multilingualism in "one and the same people", i.e. the Sardinians, because of immigration "by Spaniards and Italians" who came to the island to trade with the natives.

The long-lasting war and the so-called Black Death had a devastating effect on the island, depopulating large parts of it. People from the neighbouring island of Corsica, which had been already Tuscanised, began to settle en masse in the northern Sardinian coast, leading to the birth of Sassarese and then Gallurese, two Italo-Dalmatian lects.

Extract from sa Vitta et sa Morte, et Passione de sanctu Gavinu, Prothu et Januariu (A. Cano, ~1400)

O
Deus eternu, sempre omnipotente,
In s'aiudu meu ti piacat attender,
Et dami gratia de poder acabare
Su sanctu martiriu, in rima vulgare,
5. De sos sanctos martires tantu gloriosos
Et cavaleris de Cristus victoriosos,
Sanctu Gavinu, Prothu e Januariu,
Contra su demoniu, nostru adversariu,
Fortes defensores et bonos advocados,
10. Qui in su Paradisu sunt glorificados
De sa corona de sanctu martiriu.
Cussos sempre siant in nostru adiutoriu.
Amen.

Despite Catalan being widely spoken and written on the island at this time, leaving a lasting influence in Sardinia, Sardinian continued to be used in documents pertaining to the Kingdom's administrative and ecclesiastical spheres until the late 17th century. Religious orders also made use of the language. The regulations of the seminary of Alghero, issued by the bishop Andreas Baccallar on July 12, 1586, were in Sardinian; since they were directed to the entire diocese of Alghero and Unions, the provisions intended for the direct knowledge of the people were written in Sardinian and Catalan. The earliest catechism to date found in lingua sardisca from the post-Tridentine period is dated 1695, at the foot of the synodal constitutions of the archbishopric of Cagliari.

The sociolinguistic situation was characterised by the active and passive competence of the two Iberian languages in the cities and of Sardinian in the rest of the island, as reported in various contemporary testimonies: in 1561, the Portuguese Jesuit Francisco Antonio estimated Sardinian to be «the ordinary language of Sardinia, as Italian is of Italy; in the cities of Cagliari and Alghero the ordinary language is Catalan, although there are many people who also use Sardinian». Cristòfor Despuig, in Los Colloquis de la Insigne Ciutat de Tortosa, had previously claimed in 1557 that, although Catalan had carved out a place for itself as llengua cortesana, in many parts of the island the "ancient language of the Kingdom" ("llengua antigua del Regne") was still preserved; the ambassador and visitador reial Martin Carillo (supposed author of the ironic judgment on the Sardinians' tribal and sectarian divisions: "pocos, locos, y mal unidos" 'few, thickheaded, and badly united') noted in 1611 that the main cities spoke Catalan and Spanish, but outside these cities no other language was understood than Sardinian, which in turn was understood by everyone in the entire Kingdom; Joan Gaspar Roig i Jalpí, author of Llibre dels feyts d'armes de Catalunya, reported in the mid-seventeenth century that in Sardinia "parlen la llengua catalana molt polidament, axì com fos a Catalunya" ('they speak Catalan very well, as though I was in Catalonia'); Anselm Adorno, originally from Genoa but living in Bruges, noted in his pilgrimages how, many foreigners notwithstanding, the natives still spoke their own language (linguam propriam sardiniscam loquentes);); another testimony is offered by the rector of the Jesuit college of Sassari Baldassarre Pinyes who, in Rome, wrote: "As far as the Sardinian language is concerned, Your Paternity should know that it is not spoken in this city, nor in Alghero, nor in Cagliari: it is only spoken in the towns".

The 16th century is marked by a new literary revival of Sardinian, starting from the 15th-century Sa Vitta et sa Morte, et Passione de sanctu Gavinu, Brothu et Ianuariu, written by Antòni Canu (1400–1476) and published in 1557. Rimas Spirituales, by Hieronimu Araolla, was aimed at "glorifying and enriching Sardinian, our language" (magnificare et arrichire sa limba nostra sarda) as the Spanish, French and Italian poets had already done for their own languages (la Deffense et illustration de la langue françoyse and Il Dialogo delle lingue). This way, Araolla is one of the first Sardinian authors to bind the language to a Sardinian nation, the existence of which is not outright stated but naturally implied. (Note: Incipit to "Lettera al Maestro" in Ines Loi Corvetto (1993). La Sardegna e la Corsica. Torino: UTET. Hieronimu Araolla (1915). Max Leopold Wagner (ed.). Die Rimas Spirituales Von Girolamo Araolla. Nach Dem Einzigen Erhaltenen Exemplar Der Universitätsbibliothek in Cagliari. Princeton University. p. 76.: Semper happisi desiggiu, Illustrissimu Segnore, de magnificare, & arrichire sa limba nostra Sarda; dessa matessi manera qui sa naturale insoro tottu sas naciones dessu mundu hant magnificadu & arrichidu; comente est de vider per isos curiosos de cuddas.) Antonio Lo Frasso, a poet born in Alghero (a city he remembered fondly) who spent his life in Barcelona, wrote lyric poetry in Sardinian.

Agreeing with Fara's aforementioned De rebus Sardois, the Sardinian attorney Sigismondo Arquer, author of Sardiniae brevis historia et descriptio in Sebastian Münster's Cosmographia universalis (whose report would also be quoted in Conrad Gessner's "On the different languages used by the various nations across the globe" with minor variations), stated that Sardinian prevailed in most of the Kingdom, with particular regard for the interior, while Catalan and Spanish were spoken in the cities, where the predominantly Iberian ruling class "occupies most of the official positions"; although the Sardinian language had become fragmented due to foreign domination (i.e. "namely Latins, Pisans, Genoese, Spanish, and Africans"), Arquer pointed to there being many Sardinian words with apparently no traceable origin and reported that Sardinians nevertheless "understand each other perfectly".

Especially through the reorganization of the monarchy led by the Count-Duke of Olivares, Sardinia would gradually join a broad Spanish cultural sphere. Spanish was perceived as an elitist language, gaining solid ground among the ruling Sardinian class; Spanish had thus a profound influence on Sardinian, especially in those words, styles and cultural models owing to the prestigious international role of the Habsburg monarchy as well as the Court. (Note: Jacinto Arnal de Bolea (1636), El Forastero, Antonio Galcerin editor, Cagliari – "....ofreciéndonos a la vista la insigne ciudad de Càller, corte que me dixeron era de aquel reino. ....La hermosura de las damas, el buen gusto de su alino, lo prendido y bien saconado de lo curioso-dandole vida con mil donaires-, la grandeza en los titulos, el lucimientos en los cavalleros, el concurso grande de la nobleza y el agasajo para un forastero no os los podrà zifrar mi conocimiento. Basta para su alavanza el deciros que alcuna vez, con olvido en mi peregrinaciò y con descuido en mis disdichas, discurria por los templos no estrano y por las calles no atajado, me hallava con evidencias grandes que era aquel sitio el alma de Madrid, que con tanta urbanidad y cortesìa se exercitavan en sus nobles correspondencias") Most Sardinian authors would write in both Spanish and Sardinian until the 19th century and were well-versed in the former, like Vicente Bacallar y Sanna that was one of the founders of the Real Academia Española; according to Bruno Anatra's estimates, around 87% of the books printed in Cagliari were in Spanish. A notable exception was Pedro Delitala (1550–1590), who decided to write in Italian instead. Nonetheless, the Sardinian language retained much of its importance, earning respect from the Spaniards in light of it being the ethnic code the people from most of the Kingdom kept using, especially in the rural areas. Sardinian endured, moreover, in religious drama and the drafting of notarial deeds in the interior. New genres of popular poetry were established around this period, like the gosos or gocius (sacred hymns), the anninnia (lullabies), the atitu (funeral laments), the batorinas (quatrains), the berbos and paraulas (curses), and the improvised poetry of the mutu and mutetu.

Sardinian was also one of the few official languages, along with Spanish, Catalan and Portuguese, whose knowledge was required to be an officer in the Spanish tercios, among which the Sardinians were fully considered and counted as spanyols, as requested by the Stamenti in 1553.

Ioan Matheu Garipa, a priest from Orgosolo who translated the Italian Leggendario delle Sante Vergini e Martiri di Gesù Cristo into Sardinian (Legendariu de Santas Virgines, et Martires de Iesu Christu) in 1627, was the first author to claim that Sardinian was the closest living relative of classical Latin (Note: "In this Roman Court, having come into possession of a book in Italian, a new edition […] I have translated it into Sardinian to give news of it to the devotees of my homeland who are eager to know these legends. I have translated them into Sardinian, rather than into another language, out of love for the people […] who did not need an interpreter to enunciate them, and also because the Sardinian language is noble by virtue of its participation in Latinity, since no language spoken is as close to classical Latin as Sardinian. […] Since, if the Italian language is much appreciated, and if among all the vernacular languages is in first place for having much followed in the footsteps of Latin, no less should the Sardinian language be appreciated considering that it is not only a relative of Latin, but is largely straightforward Latin. […] And even if this were not so, it is sufficient reason to write in Sardinian to see that all nations write and print books in their natural language, boasting of having history and moral subjects written in the vernacular, so that all may benefit from them. And since the Sardinian Latin language is as clear and intelligible (when written, and pronounced as it should be), if not even more so, than the vulgar ones, since the Italians, and Spaniards, and all those who practice Latin in general understand it." Original text: "Sendemi vennidu à manos in custa Corte Romana vnu Libru in limba Italiana, nouamente istampadu, […] lu voltao in limba Sarda pro dare noticia de cuddas assos deuotos dessa patria mia disijosos de tales legendas. Las apo voltadas in sardu menjus qui non-in atera limba pro amore de su vulgu […] qui non-tenjan bisonju de interprete pro bi-las decrarare, & tambene pro esser sa limba sarda tantu bona, quanta participat de sa latina, qui nexuna de quantas limbas si plàtican est tantu parente assa latina formale quantu sa sarda. […] Pro su quale si sa limba Italiana si preciat tantu de bona, & tenet su primu logu inter totas sas limbas vulgares pro esser meda imitadore dessa Latina, non-si diat preciare minus sa limba Sarda pusti non-solu est parente dessa Latina, pero ancora sa majore parte est latina vera. […] Et quando cussu non-esseret, est suficiente motiuu pro iscrier in Sardu, vider, qui totas sas nationes iscriven, & istampan libros in sas proprias limbas naturales in soro, preciandosi de tenner istoria, & materias morales iscritas in limba vulgare, pro qui totus si potan de cuddas aprofetare. Et pusti sa limba latina Sarda est clara & intelligibile (iscrita, & pronunciada comente conuenit) tantu & plus qui non-quale si querjat dessas vulgares, pusti sos Italianos, & Ispagnolos, & totu cuddos qui tenen platica de latinu la intenden medianamente." Garipa, Ioan Matheu. Legendariu de santas virgines, et martires de Iesu Crhistu, 1627, Per Lodouicu Grignanu, Roma) and, like Araolla before him, valued Sardinian as the language of a specific ethno-national community. In this regard, the philologist Paolo Maninchedda argues that by doing so, these authors did not write "about Sardinia or in Sardinian to fit into an island system, but to inscribe Sardinia and its language – and with them, themselves – in a European system. Elevating Sardinia to a cultural dignity equal to that of other European countries also meant promoting the Sardinians, and in particular their educated countrymen, who felt that they had no roots and no place in the continental cultural system".

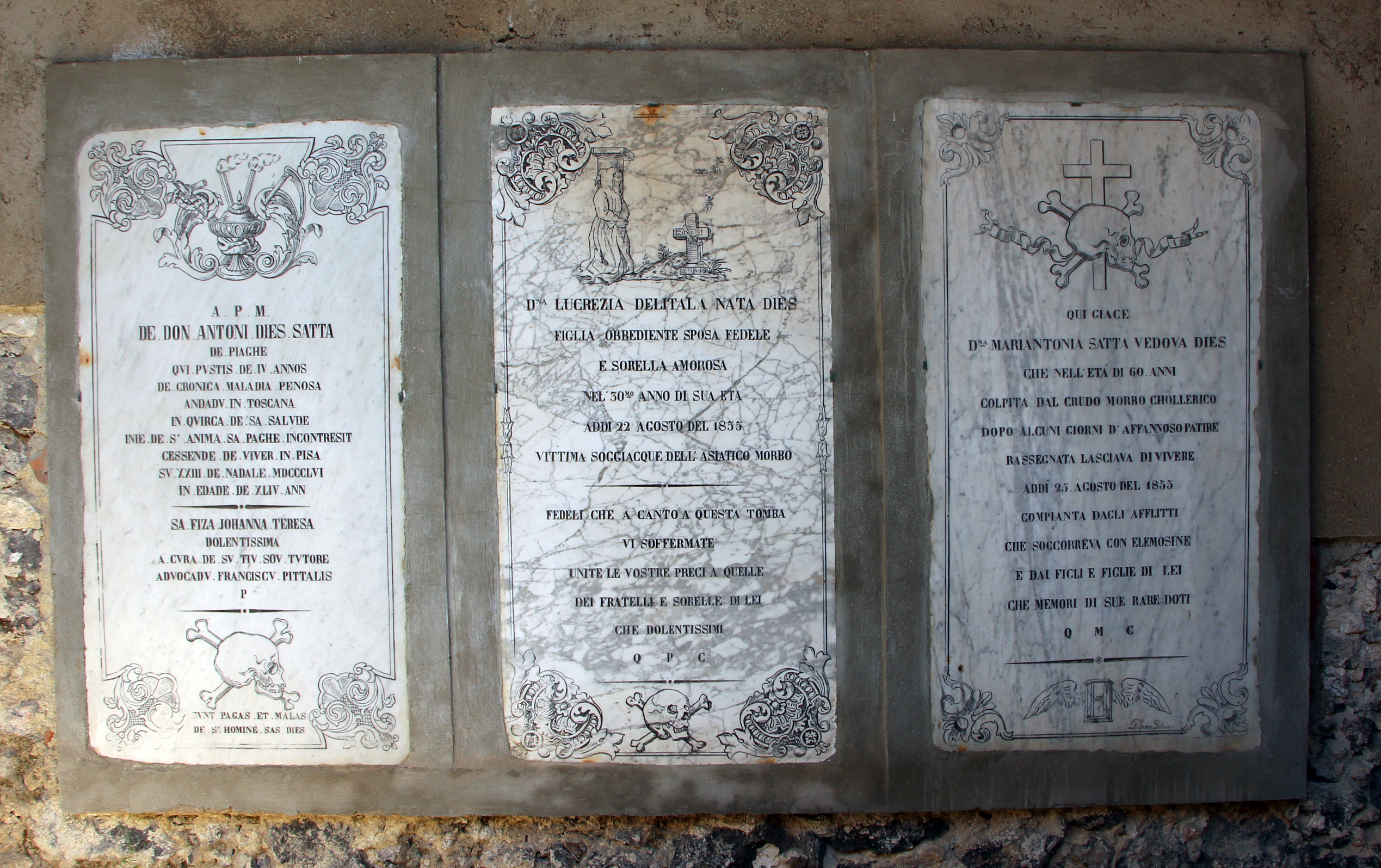
Three gravestones dating to the second half of the 19th century in the historic cemetery of Ploaghe (Logudoro), wherein a total of 39 gravestones have writings in Sardinian and 3 in Italian

=== Savoyard period – Italian influence ===
The War of the Spanish Succession gave Sardinia to Austria, whose sovereignty was confirmed by the 1713–14 treaties of Utrecht and Rastatt. In 1717 a Spanish fleet reoccupied Cagliari, and the following year Sardinia was ceded to Victor Amadeus II of Savoy in exchange for Sicily. The Savoyard representative, the Count of Lucerna di Campiglione, received the definitive deed of cession from the Austrian delegate Don Giuseppe dei Medici, on condition that the "rights, statutes, privileges of the nation" that had been the subject of diplomatic negotiations were preserved. The island thus entered the Italian orbit after the Iberian one, although this transfer would not initially entail any social nor cultural and linguistic changes: Sardinia would still retain for a long time its Iberian character, so much so that only in 1767 were the Aragonese and Spanish dynastic symbols replaced by the Savoyard cross. Until 1848, the Kingdom of Sardinia would be a composite state, and the island of Sardinia would remain a separate country with its own traditions and institutions, albeit without summa potestas and in personal union as an overseas possession of the House of Savoy.

The Sardinian language, although practiced in a state of diglossia, continued to be spoken by all social classes, its linguistic alterity and independence being universally perceived; Spanish, on the other hand, was the prestige code known and used by the Sardinian social strata with at least some education, in so pervasive a manner that Joaquín Arce refers to it in terms of a paradox: Castilian had become the common language of the islanders by the time they officially ceased to be Spanish and, through their annexation by the House of Savoy, became Italian through Piedmont instead. Given the current situation, the Piedmontese ruling class which held the reins of the island, in this early phase, resolved to maintain its political and social institutions, while at the same time progressively hollowing them out as well as "treating the [Sardinian] followers of one faction and of the other equally, but keeping them divided in such a way as to prevent them from uniting, and for us to put to good use such rivalry when the occasion presents itself".

According to Amos Cardia, this pragmatic stance was rooted in three political reasons: in the first place, the Savoyards did not want to rouse international suspicion and followed to the letter the rules dictated by the Treaty of London, signed on 2 August 1718, whereby they had committed themselves to respect the fundamental laws of the newly acquired Kingdom; in the second place, they did not want to antagonize the hispanophile locals, especially the elites; and finally, they lingered on hoping they could one day manage to dispose of Sardinia altogether, while still keeping the title of Kings by regaining Sicily. In fact, since imposing Italian would have violated one of the fundamental laws of the Kingdom, which the new rulers swore to observe upon taking on the mantle of King, Victor Amadeus II emphasised the need for the operation to be carried out through incremental steps, small enough to go relatively unnoticed (insensibilmente), as early as 1721. Such prudence was again noted, when the King claimed that he was nevertheless not intentioned to ban either Sardinian or Spanish on two separate occasions, in 1726 and 1728.

The fact that the new masters of Sardinia felt at loss as to how they could better deal with a cultural and linguistic environment they perceived as alien to the Mainland, where Italian had long been the prestige and even official language, can be deduced from the study Memoria dei mezzi che si propongono per introdurre l'uso della lingua italiana in questo Regno ("Account of the proposed ways to introduce the Italian language to this Kingdom") commissioned in 1726 by the Piedmontese administration, to which the Jesuit Antonio Falletti from Barolo responded suggesting the ignotam linguam per notam expōnĕre ("to introduce an unknown language [Italian] through a known one [Spanish]") method as the best course of action for Italianisation. In the same year, Victor Amadeus II had already said he could no longer tolerate the lack of ability to speak Italian on the part of the islanders, in view of the inconveniences that such inability was putting through for the functionaries sent from the Mainland. Restrictions to mixed marriages between Sardinian women and the Piedmontese officers dispatched to the island, which had hitherto been prohibited by law, were at one point lifted and even encouraged so as to better introduce the language to the local population.

Eduardo Blasco Ferrer argues that, in contrast to the cultural dynamics long established in the Mainland between Italian and the various Romance dialects thereof, in Sardinia the relationship between the Italian language – recently introduced by Savoy – and the native one had been perceived from the start by the locals, educated and uneducated alike, as a relationship (albeit unequal in terms of political power and prestige) between two very different languages, and not between a language and one of its dialects. The plurisecular Iberian period had also contributed in making the Sardinians feel relatively detached from the Italian language and its cultural sphere; local sensibilities towards the language were further exacerbated by the fact that the Spanish ruling class had long considered Sardinian a distinct language, with respect to their own ones and Italian as well. The perception of the alterity of Sardinian was also widely shared among the Italians who happened to visit the island and recounted their experiences with the local population, whom they often likened to the Spanish and the ancient peoples of the Orient, an opinion illustrated by the Duke Francis IV and Antonio Bresciani; a popular assertion by the officer Giulio Bechi, who would participate in a military campaign against Sardinian banditry dubbed as caccia grossa ("great hunt"), was that the islanders spoke "a horrible language, as intricate as Saracen, and sounding like Spanish".

However, the Savoyard government eventually decided to directly introduce Italian altogether to Sardinia on the conventional date of 25 July 1760, because of the Savoyards' geopolitical need to draw the island away from Spain's gravitational pull and culturally integrate Sardinia into the orbit of the Italian peninsula, through the thorough assimilation of the island's cultural models, which were deemed by the Savoyard functionaries as "foreign" and "inferior", to Piedmont. (Note: King Charles Emmanuel III of Sardinia, Royal Note, 23 July 1760: "Dovendosi per tali insegnamenti (scuole inferiori) adoperare fra le lingue più colte quella che è meno lontana dal materno dialetto ed a un tempo la più corrispondente alle pubbliche convenienze, si è determinato di usare nelle scuole predette l'italiana, siccome quella appunto che non essendo più diversa dalla sarda di quello fosse la castigliana, poiché anzi la maggior parte dei sardi più colti già la possiede; resta altresì la più opportuna per maggiormente agevolare il commercio ed aumentare gli scambievoli comodi; ed i Piemontesi che verranno nel Regno, non avranno a studiare una nuova lingua per meglio abituarsi al servizio pubblico e dei sardi, i quali in tal modo potranno essere impiegati anche nel continente.") In fact, the measure in question prohibited, among other things, "the unreserved use of the Castilian idiom in writing and speaking, which, after forty years of Italian rule, was still so deeply rooted in the hearts of the Sardinian teachers". In 1764, the exclusive imposition of the Italian language was finally extended to all sectors of public life, including education, in parallel with the reorganisation of the Universities of Cagliari and Sassari, which saw the arrival of personnel from the Italian mainland, and the reorganisation of lower education, where it was decided likewise to send teachers from Piedmont to make up for the lack of Italian-speaking Sardinian teachers. In 1763, it had already been planned to "send a number of skilled Italian professors" to Sardinia to "rid the Sardinian teachers of their errors" and "steer them along the right path". The purpose did not elude the attention of the Sardinian ruling class, who deplored the fact that "the Piedmontese bishops have introduced preaching in Italian" and, in an anonymous document attributed to the conservative Sardinian Parliament and eloquently called Lamento del Regno ("Grievance of the Kingdom"), denounced how "the arms, the privileges, the laws, the language, University, and currency of Aragon have now been taken away, to the disgrace of Spain, and to the detriment of all particulars".

Spanish was replaced as the official language, even though Italian struggled to take roots for a long time: Milà i Fontanals wrote in 1863 that Catalan had been used in notarial instruments from Sardinia well into the 1780s, together with Sardinian, while parish registers and official deeds continued to be drawn up in Spanish until 1828. The most immediate effect of the order was thus the further marginalization of the Sardinians' native idiom, making way for a thorough Italianisation of the island. For the first time, in fact, even the wealthy and most powerful families of rural Sardinia, the printzipales, started to perceive Sardinian as a handicap. Girolamo Sotgiu asserts on the matter that "the Sardinian ruling class, just as it had become Hispanicized, now became Italianised, without ever managing to become Sardinian, that is to say, to draw from the experience and culture of their people, from which it came, those elements of concreteness without which a culture and a ruling class always seem foreign even in their homeland. This was the objective that the Savoyard government had set itself and which, to a good measure, it managed to pursue".

Francesco Gemelli, in Il Rifiorimento della Sardegna proposto nel miglioramento di sua agricoltura, depicts the island's linguistic pluralism in 1776, and referring to Francesco Cetti's I quadrupedi della Sardegna for a more meticulous analysis of "the character of the Sardinian language ("indole della lingua sarda") and the main differences between Sassarese and Tuscan": "five languages are spoken in Sardinia, that is Spanish, Italian, Sardinian, Algherese, and Sassarese. The former two because of the past and today's domination, and they are understood and spoken through schooling by all the educated people residing in the cities, as well as villages. Sardinian is common to all the Kingdom, and is divided into two main dialects, Campidanese Sardinian and Sardinian from the Upper Half ("capo di sopra"). Algherese is a Catalan dialect, for a Catalan colony is Alghero; and finally Sassarese, which is spoken in Sassari, Tempio and Castel sardo (sic), is a dialect of Tuscan, a relic of their Pisan overlords. Spanish is losing ground to Italian, which has taken over the former in the fields of education and jurisdiction".

The first systematic study on the Sardinian language was written in 1782 by the philologist Matteo Madau, with the title of Il ripulimento della lingua sarda lavorato sopra la sua antologia colle due matrici lingue, la greca e la latina. The intention that motivated Madau was to trace the ideal path through which Sardinian could be elevated to the island's proper national language; nevertheless, according to Amos Cardia, the Savoyard climate of repression on Sardinian culture would induce Matteo Madau to veil its radical proposals with some literary devices, and the author was eventually unable to ever translate them into reality. The first volume of comparative Sardinian dialectology was produced in 1786 by the Catalan Jesuit Andres Febres, known in Italy and Sardinia by the pseudonym of Bonifacio d'Olmi, who returned from Lima where he had first published a book of Mapuche grammar in 1764. After he moved to Cagliari, he became fascinated with the Sardinian language as well and conducted some research on three specific dialects; the aim of his work, entitled Prima grammatica de' tre dialetti sardi, was to "write down the rules of the Sardinian language" and spur the Sardinians to "cherish the language of their Homeland, as well as Italian". The government in Turin, which had been monitoring Febres' activity, decided that his work would not be allowed to be published: Victor Amadeus III had supposedly not appreciated the fact that the book had a bilingual dedication to him in Italian and Sardinian, a mistake that his successors, while still echoing back to a general concept of "Sardinian ancestral homeland", would from then on avoid, and making exclusive use of Italian to produce their works.

At the end of the 18th century, following the trail of the French Revolution, a group of the Sardinian middle class planned to break away from Savoyard rule and institute an independent Sardinian Republic under French protection; all over the island, a number of political pamphlets printed in Sardinian were illegally distributed, calling for a mass revolt against the "Piedmontese" rule and the barons' abuse. The most famous literary product born out of such political unrest was the poem Su patriottu sardu a sos feudatarios, noted as a testament of the French-inspired democratic and patriotic values, as well as Sardinia's situation under feudalism. As for the reactions that the three-year Sardinian revolutionary period aroused in the island's ruling class, who were now in the process of Italianisation, for Sotgiu "its failure was complete: undecided between a breathless municipalism and a dead-end attachment to the Crown, it did not have the courage to lead the revolutionary wave coming from the countryside". In fact, although pamphlets such as "the Achilles of Sardinian Liberation" circulated, denouncing the backwardness of an oppressive feudal system and a Ministry that was said to have "always been the enemy of the Sardinian Nation", and the "social pact between the Sovereign and the Nation" was declared to have been broken, there was no radical change in the form of government: therefore, it is not surprising, according to Sotgiu, that although "the call for the Sardinian nation, its traditions and identity became stronger and stronger, even to the point of requesting the creation of a stable military force of "Sardinian nationals only"", the concrete hypothesis of abolishing the monarchical and feudal regimes did not "make its way into the consciousness of many". The only result was therefore "the defeat of the peasant class emerging from the very core of feudal society, urged on by the masses of peasants and led by the most advanced forces of the Sardinian bourgeoisie" and, conversely, the victory of the feudal barons and "of large strata of the town bourgeoisie that had developed within the framework of the feudal order and feared that the abolition of feudalism and the proclamation of the Republic might simultaneously destroy the very basis of their own wealth and prestige".

In the climate of monarchic restoration that followed Giovanni Maria Angioy's rebellion, whose substantial failure marked therefrom a historic watershed in Sardinia's future, other Sardinian intellectuals, all characterized by an attitude of general devotion to their island as well as proven loyalty to the House of Savoy, posed in fact the question of the Sardinian language, while being careful enough to use only Italian as a language to get their point across. During the 19th century in particular, the Sardinian intellectuality and ruling class found itself divided over the adherence to the Sardinian national values and the allegiance to the new Italian nationality, toward which they eventually leaned in the wake of the abortive Sardinian revolution. The identity crisis of the Sardinian ruling class, and their strive for acceptance into the new citizenship of the Italian identity, would manifest itself with the publication of the so-called Falsi d'Arborea by the unionist Pietro Martini in 1863.

A few years after the major anti-Piedmontese revolt, in 1811, the priest Vincenzo Raimondo Porru published a timid essay of Sardinian grammar, which, however, referred expressively to the Southern dialect (hence the title of Saggio di grammatica del dialetto sardo meridionale) and, out of prudence towards the king, was made with the declared intention of easing the acquisition of Italian among his fellow Sardinians, instead of protecting their language. The more ambitious work of the professor and senator Giovanni Spano, the Ortographia sarda nationale ("Sardinian National Orthography"), although it was officially meant for the same purpose as Porru's, (Note: In Spano's dedication to Charles Albert's wife, out of devotion to the new rulers, there are several passages in which the author sings the praises of the Savoyards and their cultural policies pursued in Sardinia, such as "It was destiny that the sweet Italian tongue, although born on the pleasant banks of the Arno, would one day also become rich heritage of the Tirso's inhabitants" (p. 5) and, formulating a vow of loyalty to the new dynasty of regents that followed the Spanish ones, "Sardinia owes so much to the most August HOUSE OF SAVOY, which, once the Hispanic domination had ceased, so wisely promoted the development of science, and also commanded during the middle of the last century, that Tuscan be made the language of the Dicasteries and public education" (p. 6). The Preface, entitled Al giovanetto alunno, states the intention, already common to Porru, to publish a work dedicated to the teaching of Italian, through the differences and similarities provided by another language more familiar to the Sardinian subjects.) attempted in reality to establish a unified Sardinian orthography based on Logudorese, just like Florentine had become the basis for Italian.

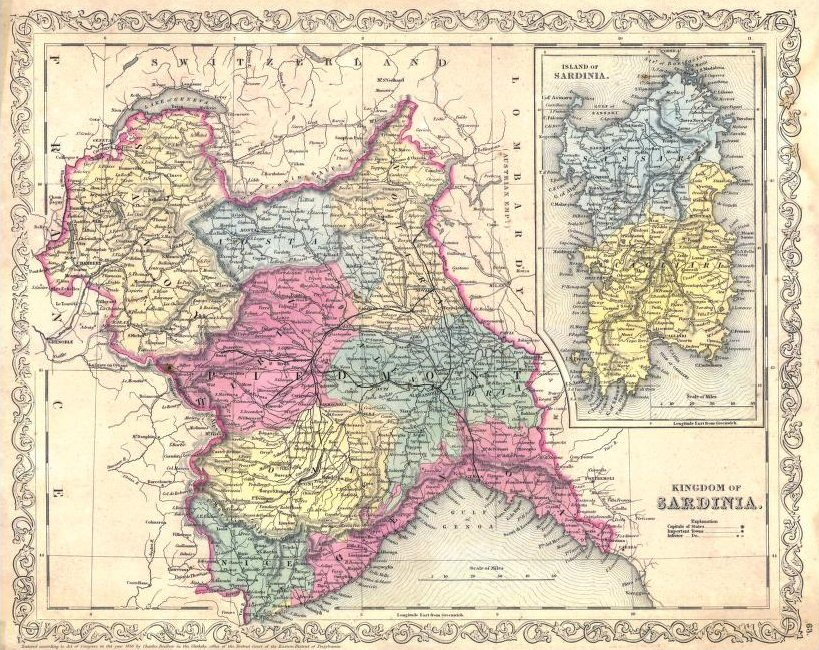
The Kingdom of Sardinia in 1856

The jurist Carlo Baudi di Vesme claimed that the suppression of Sardinian and the imposition of Italian was desirable to make the islanders into "civilized Italians". (Note: "Una innovazione in materia di incivilimento della Sardegna e d'istruzione pubblica, che sotto vari aspetti sarebbe importantissima, si è quella di proibire severamente in ogni atto pubblico civile non meno che nelle funzioni ecclesiastiche, tranne le prediche, l'uso dei dialetti sardi, prescrivendo l'esclusivo impiego della lingua italiana. Attualmente in sardo si gettano i così detti pregoni o bandi; in sardo si cantano gl'inni dei Santi (Goccius), alcuni dei quali privi di dignità [...] È necessario inoltre scemare l'uso del dialetto sardo [sic] ed introdurre quello della lingua italiana anche per altri non men forti motivi; ossia per incivilire alquanto quella nazione, sì affinché vi siano più universalmente comprese le istruzioni e gli ordini del Governo,... sì finalmente per togliere una delle maggiori divisioni, che sono fra la Sardegna e i Regi stati di terraferma." Carlo Baudi di Vesme (1848). Considerazioni politiche ed economiche sulla Sardegna. Dalla Stamperia Reale. pp. 49–51.) Since Sardinia was, in the words of Di Vesme, "not Spanish, but neither Italian: it is and has been for centuries just Sardinian", it was necessary, at the turn of the circumstances that "inflamed it with ambition, desire and love of all things Italian", to promote these tendencies even more in order "to profit from them in the common interest", for which it proved "almost necessary" to spread the Italian language in Sardinia "presently so little known in the interior" with a view to better enable the Perfect Fusion: "Sardinia will be Piedmont, it will be Italy; it will receive and give us lustre, wealth and power!".

The primary and tertiary education was thus offered exclusively through Italian, and Piedmontese cartographers went on to replace many Sardinian place names with Italian ones. The Italian education, being imparted in a language the Sardinians were not familiar with, (Note: Andrea Manca dell'Arca, an agronomist from Sassari (a city which, like most of Northern Sardinia, had been historically more exposed via Corsica to the Italian culture than the rest of the island) had so illustrated how Italian was still perceived by the locals: "Italian is as familiar to me as Latin, French or other foreign languages which one only partially learns through grammar study and the books, without fully mastering them" (È tanto nativa per me la lingua italiana, come la latina, francese o altre forestiere che solo s'imparano in parte colla grammatica, uso e frequente lezione de' libri, ma non si possiede appieno). Ricordi di Santu Lussurgiu di Francesco Maria Porcu in Santu Lussurgiu dalle Origini alla "Grande Guerra" – Grafiche editoriali Solinas – Nuoro, 2005) spread Italian for the first time in history to Sardinian villages, marking the troubled transition to the new dominant language; the school environment, which employed Italian as the sole means of communication, grew to become a microcosm around the then-monolingual Sardinian villages. (Note: The introduction of Italian as a foreign language to the Sardinian villages is exemplified in a passage from the contemporary Francesco (Frantziscu) Masala's Sa limba est s'istoria de su mundu; Condaghe de Biddafraigada ("The language is the world's history; Biddafraigada's Condaghe"), Condaghes, p. 4: "A sos tempos de sa pitzinnìa, in bidda, totus chistionaiamus in limba sarda. In domos nostras no si faeddaiat atera limba. E deo, in sa limba nadìa, comintzei a connoscher totu sas cosas de su mundu. A sos ses annos, intrei in prima elementare e su mastru de iscola proibeit, a mie e a sos fedales mios, de faeddare in s'unica limba chi connoschiamus: depiamus chistionare in limba italiana, "la lingua della Patria", nos nareit, seriu seriu, su mastru de iscola. Gai, totus sos pitzinnos de 'idda, intraian in iscola abbistos e allirgos e nde bessian tontos e cari-tristos." ("When I was a little kid growing up in the village, we all used to speak in the Sardinian language. We did not speak any other language in our homes. And I began to know all the things of the world in the native language. At the age of six, I went to first grade and the school teacher forbade me as well as my peers to speak in the only language we knew: from that moment on, we only had to speak in Italian, "the language of the Fatherland", he told us seriously. Thus, the children of our village would come to school bright and happy, and walk out of school empty-headed and with a gloomy look on our faces.")) In 1811, the canon Salvatore Carboni published in Bologna the polemic book Sos discursos sacros in limba sarda ("Holy Discourses in Sardinian language"), wherein the author lamented the fact that Sardinia, "hoe provinzia italiana non podet tenner sas lezzes e sos attos pubblicos in sa propia limba" ("Being an Italian province nowadays, [Sardinia] cannot have laws and public acts made in its own language"), and while claiming that "sa limba sarda, totu chi non uffiziale, durat in su Populu Sardu cantu durat sa Sardigna" ("the Sardinian language, however unofficial, will last as long as Sardinia among the Sardinians"), he also asked himself "Proite mai nos hamus a dispreziare cun d'unu totale abbandonu sa limba sarda, antiga et nobile cantu s'italiana, sa franzesa et s'ispagnola?" ("Why should we show neglect and contempt for Sardinian, which is a language as ancient and noble as Italian, French and Spanish?").

In 1827, the historical legal code serving as the consuetud de la nació sardesca in the days of the Iberian rule, the Carta de Logu, was abolished and replaced by the more advanced Savoyard code of Charles Felix "Leggi civili e criminali del Regno di Sardegna", written in Italian. The Perfect Fusion with the Mainland States, enacted under the auspices of a "transplant, without any reserves and obstacles, [of] the culture and civilization of the Italian Mainland to Sardinia", would result in the loss of the island's residual autonomy and marked the moment when "the language of the "Sardinian nation" lost its value as an instrument with which to ethnically identify a particular people and its culture, to be codified and cherished, and became instead one of the many regional dialects subordinated to the national language".

Despite the long-term assimilation policy, the anthem of the Savoyard Kingdom of Sardinia would be S'hymnu sardu nationale ("the Sardinian National Anthem"), also known as Cunservet Deus su Re ("God save the King"), before it was de facto replaced by the Italian Marcia Reale as well, in 1861. However, even when the island became part of the Kingdom of Italy under Victor Emmanuel II in 1861, Sardinia's distinct culture from the now unified Mainland made it an overall neglected province within the newly proclaimed unitary nation state. Between 1848 and 1861, the island was plunged into a social and economic crisis that was to last until the post-war period. Eventually, Sardinian came to be perceived as sa limba de su famine / sa lingua de su famini, literally translating into English as "the language of hunger" (i.e. the language of the poor), and Sardinian parents strongly supported the teaching of the Italian tongue to their children, since they saw it as the portal to escaping from a poverty-stricken, rural, isolated and underprivileged life.

=== Late modern period ===
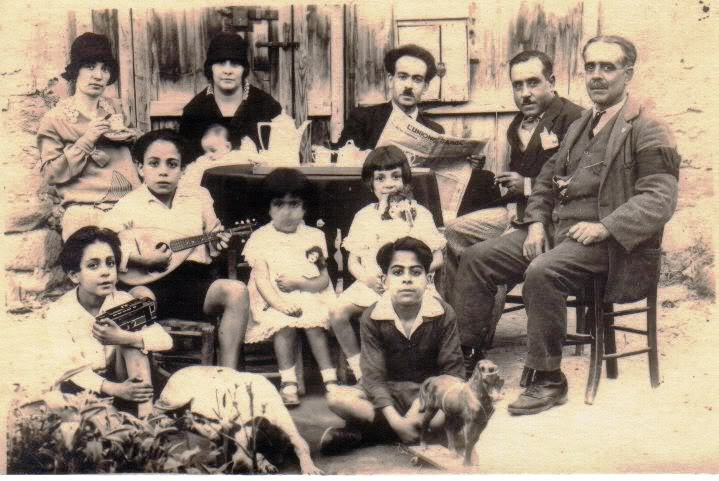
A Sardinian family reading L'Unione Sarda ("The Sardinian Union"), a daily newspaper in the Italian language founded in 1889

At the dawn of the 20th century, Sardinian had remained an object of research almost only among the island's scholars, struggling to garner international interest and even more suffering from a certain marginalization in the strictly Italian sphere: one observes in fact "the prevalence of foreign scholars over Italian ones and/or the existence of fundamental and still irreplaceable contributions by non-Italian linguists". Previously, Sardinian had been mentioned in a book by August Fuchs on irregular verbs in Romance languages (Über die sogennannten unregelmässigen Zeitwörter in den romanischen Sprachen, Berlin, 1840) and, later, in the second edition of Grammatik der romanischen Sprachen (1856–1860) written by Friedrich Christian Diez, credited as one of the founders of Romance philology. The pioneering research of German authors spurred a certain interest in the Sardinian language on the part of some Italian scholars, such as Graziadio Isaia Ascoli and, above all, his disciple Pier Enea Guarnerio, who was the first in Italy to classify Sardinian as a separate member of the Romance language family without subordinating it to the group of "Italian dialects", as was previously the custom in Italy. Wilhelm Meyer-Lübke, an undisputed authority on Romance linguistics, published in 1902 an essay on Logudorese Sardinian from the survey of the condaghe of San Pietro di Silki (Zur Kenntnis des Altlogudoresischen, in Sitzungsberichte der kaiserliche Akademie der Wissenschaft Wien, Phil. Hist. Kl., 145), the study of which led to the initiation into Sardinian linguistics of the then university student Max Leopold Wagner: it is to the latter's activity that much of the twentieth-century knowledge and research of Sardinian in the phonetic, morphological and, in part, syntactic fields was generated.

During the mobilization for World War I, the Italian Army compelled all people on the island that were "of Sardinian stock" (di stirpe sarda) to enlist as Italian subjects and established the Sassari Infantry Brigade on 1 March 1915 at Tempio Pausania and Sinnai. Unlike the other infantry brigades of Italy, Sassari's conscripts were only Sardinians (including many officers). It is currently the only unit in Italy with an anthem in a language other than Italian: Dimonios ("Devils"), which would be written in 1994 by Luciano Sechi; its title derives from the German-language Rote Teufel ("red devils"), by which they were popularly known among the troops of the Austro-Hungarian Army. Compulsory military service around this period played a role in language shift and is referred to by historian Manlio Brigaglia as "the first great mass "nationalization"" of the Sardinians. Nevertheless, similarly to Navajo-speaking service members in the United States during World War II, as well as Quechua speakers during the Falklands War, native Sardinians were offered the opportunity to be recruited as code talkers to transmit tactical information in Sardinian over radio communications which might have otherwise run the risk of being gained by Austrian troops, since some of them hailed from Italian-speaking areas to which, therefore, the Sardinian language was utterly alien: Alfredo Graziani writes in his war diary that "having learned that many of our phonograms were being intercepted, we adopted the system of communicating on the phone only in Sardinian, certain that in this way they would never be able to understand what one was saying". To avoid infiltration attempts by said Italophone troops, positions were guarded by Sardinian recruits from the Sassari Brigade who required anyone who came to them that they identify themselves first by proving they spoke Sardinian: "si ses italianu, faedda in sardu!".

The Sardinian-born philosopher Antonio Gramsci commented on the Sardinian linguistic question while writing a letter to his sister Teresina; Gramsci was aware of the long-term ramifications of language shift, and suggested that Teresa let her son acquire Sardinian with no restriction, because doing otherwise would result in "putting his imagination into a straitjacket" as well as him ending up eventually "learning two jargons, and no language at all".

Coinciding with the year of the Irish War of Independence, Sardinian autonomism re-emerged as an expression of the fighters' movement, coagulating into the Sardinian Action Party (PsdAz) which, before long, would become one of the most important players in the island's political life. At the beginning, the party would not have had strictly ethnic claims though, being the Sardinian language and culture widely perceived, in the words of Fiorenzo Toso, as "symbols of the region's underdevelopment".

The policy of forced assimilation culminated in the twenty years of the Fascist regime, which launched a campaign of violent repression of autonomist demands and finally determined the island's definitive entry into the "national cultural system" through the combined work of the educational system and the one-party system. Local cultural expressions were thus repressed, including Sardinia's festivals and improvised poetry competitions, and a large number of Sardinian surnames were changed to sound more Italian. An argument broke out between the Sardinian poet Antioco Casula (popularly known as Montanaru) and the fascist journalist Gino Anchisi, who stated that "once the region is moribund or dead", which the regime declared to be, (Note: Casula's reply to Anchisi, arguing in favour of Sardinian as the only means through which the island's "cultural reawakening" could be pursued, was never published in the newspaper L'Unione Sarda, whose editorial staff properly censored it in accordance with the regime's directives. The newspaper then justified itself in the following way, in a personal letter addressed to Casula on 12 September: "Your article could not be published because part of it clearly exalts the region too much. This is absolutely forbidden by the current provisions of the Head of Government's press office, which specifically state: 'In no way and for no reason does the region exist'. We are very sorry. However, we would ask you to redo the article by simply talking about your poetry in dialect [sic] without touching on this dangerous subject!" Francesco Casula. "Sa chistione de sa limba in Montanaru e oe" (PDF). p. 66.) "so will the dialect (sic)", which was interpreted as "the region's revealing spiritual element"; in the wake of this debate, Anchisi managed to have Sardinian banned from the printing press, as well. The significance of the Sardinian language as it was posed by Casula, in fact, lent itself to potentially subversive themes, being tied to the practices of cultural resistance of an indigenous ethnic group, whose linguistic repertoire had to be introduced in school to preserve a "Sardinian personality" and regain "a dignity" perceived to have been lost in the process. Another famed poet from the island, Salvatore (Bore) Poddighe, fell into a severe depression and took his own life a few years after his masterwork (Sa Mundana Cummedia) had been seized by Cagliari's police commissioner. When the use of Sardinian in school was banned in 1934 as part of a nation-wide educational plan against the alloglot "dialects", the then Sardinian-speaking children were confronted with another means of communication that was supposed to be their own from then onwards.

On a whole, this period saw the most aggressive cultural assimilation effort by the central government, which led to an even further sociolinguistic degradation of Sardinian. While the interior managed to at least partially resist this intrusion at first, everywhere else the regime had succeeded in thoroughly supplanting the local cultural models with new ones hitherto foreign to the community and compress the former into a "pure matter of folklore", marking a severance from the island's heritage that engendered, according to Guido Melis, "an identity crisis with worrying social repercussions", as well as "a rift that could no longer be healed through the generations". This period is identified by Manlio Brigaglia as the second mass "nationalization" of the Sardinians, which was characterized by "a policy deliberately aiming at "Italianisation"" by means of, in his words, "a declared war" against the usage of the Sardinian language by fascism and the Catholic Church alike.

In 1945, following the restoration of political freedoms, the Sardinian Action Party called for autonomy as a federal state within the "new Italy" that had emerged from the Resistance: it was in the context of the second post-war period that, as consensus for autonomy kept growing, the party began to distinguish itself by policies based on Sardinia's linguistic and cultural specificity.

== Present situation ==
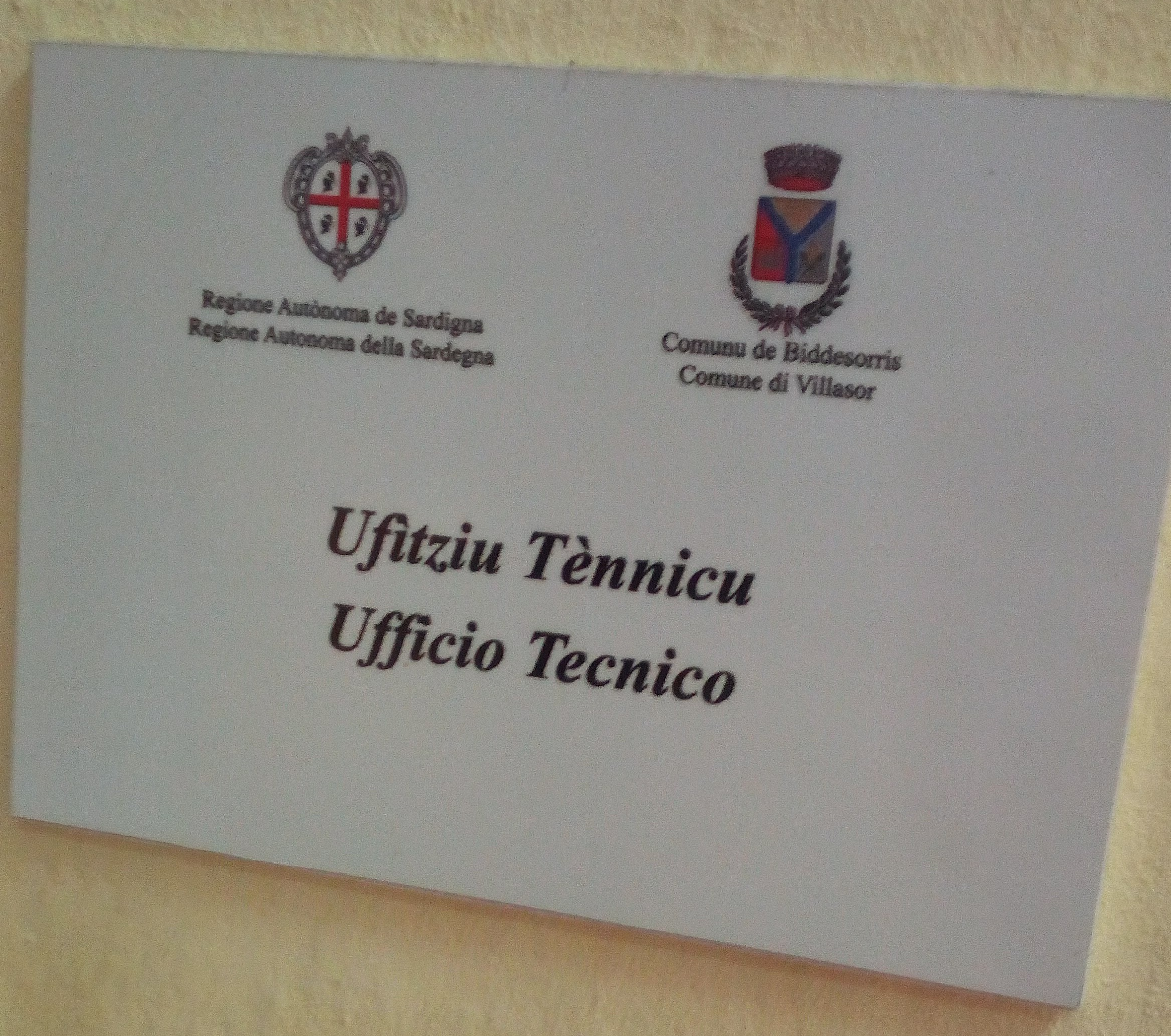
A bilingual sign in Villasor's town hall

After World War II, awareness around the Sardinian language and the danger of its slipping away did not seem to concern the Sardinian elites and entered the political spaces later than in other European peripheries marked by the presence of local ethno-linguistic minorities; Sardinian was in fact dismissed by the middle class, as both the Sardinian language and culture were still being held responsible for the island's underdevelopment. The Sardinian ruling class, drawn to the Italian modernisation stance on how to steer the islanders to "social development", believed in fact that the Sardinians had been held back by their own "traditional practices" vis-à-vis the mainlanders, and that, in order to catch up with the latter, social and cultural progress could only be brought about through the rejection of said practices. As the language bore an increasing amount of stigmatisation and came to be perceived as an undesirable identity marker, the Sardinians were consequently encouraged to part with it by way of linguistic and cultural assimilation.

At the time of drafting of the statute in 1948, the national legislator in Rome eventually decided to specify the "Sardinian specialty" as a criterion for political autonomy uniquely on the grounds of local socio-economic issues; further considerations were discarded which were centred on the ascertainment of a distinct cultural, historical and geographical identity, although they had been hitherto the primary local justifications arguing for home rule, as they were looked down upon as a potential prelude to more autonomist or even more radical separatist claims; this view would be exemplified by a report of the Italian Parliamentary Commission of Inquiry into Banditry, which warned against a looming threat posed by "isolationist tendencies injurious to the development of Sardinian society and recently manifesting themselves in the proposal to regard Sardinian as the language of an ethnic minority". Eventually, the special statute of 1948 settled instead to concentrate on the arrangement of state-funded plans (baptised with the Italian name of piani di rinascita) for the heavy industrial development of the island.

Therefore, far from generating a Statute grounded on the acknowledgment of a particular cultural identity like, for example, in the Aosta Valley and South Tyrol, what ended up resulting in Sardinia was, in the words of Mariarosa Cardia, an outcome "solely based on economic considerations, because there was not either the will or the ability to devise a strong and culturally motivated autonomy, a "Sardinian specificity" that was not defined in terms of social backwardness and economic deprivation". Emilio Lussu, who admitted that he had only voted in favour of the final draft "to prevent the Statute from being rejected altogether by a single vote, even in such a reduced form", was the only member, at the session of 30 December 1946, to call in vain for the mandatory teaching of the Sardinian language, arguing that it was "a millenary heritage that must be preserved".

In the meantime, the emphasis on Italian continued, with historical sites and ordinary objects being henceforth popularised in Italian for mass consumption (e.g. the various kinds of "traditional" pecorino cheese, zippole instead of tzipulas, carta da musica instead of carasau, formaggelle instead of pardulas / casadinas, etc.). The Ministry of Public Education once requested that the teachers willing to teach Sardinian be put under surveillance. The rejection of the indigenous language and culture, along with a rigid model of Italian-language education which induced a denigration of Sardinian through corporal punishment and shaming, has led to poor schooling for the Sardinians. Roberto Bolognesi stated that in his school years in Sardinia, he had "witnessed both physical and psychological abuse against monolingual Sardinian-speaking children. The psychological violence consisted usually in calling the children "donkeys" and in inviting the whole class to join the mockery". Early school leaving and high school failure rates in Sardinia prompted a debate in the early Nineties on the efficaciousness of strictly monolingual education, with proposals for a focus on a comparative approach.

Claims for an autonomous solution to the Sardinian economic, social and cultural problems, which the 1948 Statute proved unable to resolve, came to the fore once again in the Sixties, with campaigns, often expressed in the form of political demands by Sardinian nationalists, to give Sardinian equal status with Italian as a means to promote cultural identity. Antonio Simon Mossa had drawn from his past experiences across the world, including the newly independent country of Algeria, that Sardinians were one of the many ethnic and national minorities facing the danger of cultural assimilation, and his fervor reverberated across the Sardinian society, pushing even some non-nationalist groups to take an interest in matters relating to minorities. Although a law was passed as early as 1955 for the establishment of five professorships of Sardinian linguistics, one of the first demands for bilingualism was in fact formulated in a resolution adopted by the University of Cagliari in 1971, calling upon the national and regional authorities to recognize the Sardinians as an ethnic and linguistic minority and Sardinian as the islanders' co-official language. (Note: Istanza del Prof. A. Sanna sulla pronuncia della Facoltà di Lettere in relazione alla difesa del patrimonio etnico-linguistico sardo. Il prof.Antonio Sanna fa a questo proposito una dichiarazione: "Gli indifferenti problemi della scuola, sempre affrontati in Sardegna in torma empirica, appaiono oggi assai particolari e non risolvibili in un generico quadro nazionale; il tatto stesso che la scuola sia diventata scuola di massa comporta il rifiuto di una didattica inadeguata, in quanto basata sull'apprendimento concettuale attraverso una lingua, per molti aspetti estranea al tessuto culturale sardo. Poiché esiste un popolo sardo con una propria lingua dai caratteri diversi e distinti dall'italiano, ne discende che la lingua ufficiale dello Stato, risulta in effetti una lingua straniera, per di più insegnata con metodi didatticamente errati, che non tengono in alcun conto la lingua materna dei Sardi: e ciò con grave pregiudizio per un'efficace trasmissione della cultura sarda, considerata come sub-cultura. Va dunque respinto il tentativo di considerare come unica soluzione valida per questi problemi una forzata e artificiale forma di acculturazione dall'esterno, la quale ha dimostrato (e continua a dimostrare tutti) suoi gravi limiti, in quanto incapace di risolvere i problemi dell'isola. È perciò necessario promuovere dall'interno i valori autentici della cultura isolana, primo fra tutti quello dell'autonomia, e "provocare un salto di qualità senza un'acculturazione di tipo colonialistico, e il superamento cosciente del dislivello di cultura" (Lilliu). La Facoltà di Lettere e Filosofia dell'Università di Cagliari, coerentemente con queste premesse con l'istituzione di una Scuola Superiore di Studi Sardi, è pertanto invitata ad assumere l'iniziativa di proporre alle autorità politiche della Regione Autonoma e dello Stato il riconoscimento della condizione di minoranza etnico-linguistica per la Sardegna e della lingua sarda come lingua <<nazionale>> della minoranza. È di conseguenza opportuno che si predispongano tutti i provvedimenti a livello scolastico per la difesa e conservazione dei valori tradizionali della lingua e della cultura sarda e, in questo contesto, di tutti i dialetti e le tradizioni culturali presenti in Sardegna (ci si intende riferire al Gallurese, al Sassarese, all'Algherese e al Ligure-Carlofortino). In ogni caso tali provvedimenti dovranno comprendere necessariamente, ai livelli minimi dell'istruzione, la partenza dell'insegnamento del sardo e dei vari dialetti parlati in Sardegna, l'insegnamento nella scuola dell'obbligo riservato ai Sardi o coloro che dimostrino un'adeguata conoscenza del sardo, o tutti quegli altri provvedimenti atti a garantire la conservazione dei valori tradizionali della cultura sarda. È bene osservare come, nel quadro della diffusa tendenza a livello internazionale per la difesa delle lingue delle minoranze minacciate, provvedimenti simili a quelli proposti sono presi in Svizzera per la minoranza ladina fin dal 1938 (48000 persone), in Inghilterra per il Galles, in Italia per le minoranze valdostana, slovena e ultimamente ladina (15000 persone), oltre che per quella tedesca; a proposito di queste ultime e specificamente in relazione al nuovo ordinamento scolastico alto-atesino. Il presidente del Consiglio on. Colombo, nel raccomandare ala Camera le modifiche da apportare allo Statuto della Regione Trentino-Alto Adige (il cosiddetto "pacchetto"), <<modifiche che non-escono dal concetto di autonomia indicato dalla Costituzione>>, ha ritenuto di dover sottolineare l'opportunità "che i giovani siano istruiti nella propria lingua materna da insegnanti appartenenti allo stesso gruppo linguistico"; egli inoltre aggiungeva che "solo eliminando ogni motivo di rivendicazione si crea il necessario presupposto per consentire alla scuola di svolgere la sua funzione fondamentale in un clima propizio per la migliore formazione degli allievi". Queste chiare parole del presidente del Consiglio ci consentono di credere che non-si voglia compiere una discriminazione nei confronti della minoranza sarda, ma anche per essa valga il principio enunciato dall'opportunità dell'insegnamento della lingua materna ad opera di insegnanti appartenenti allo stesso gruppo linguistico, onde consentire alla scuola di svolgere anche in Sardegna la sua funzione fondamentale in un clima propizio alla migliore formazione per gli allievi. Si chiarisce che tutto ciò non è sciovinismo né rinuncia a una cultura irrinunciabile, ma una civile e motivata iniziativa per realizzare in Sardegna una vera scuola, una vera rinascita, "in un rapporto di competizione culturale con lo stato (...) che arricchisce la Nazione" (Lilliu)". Il Consiglio unanime approva le istanze proposte dal prof. Sanna e invita le competenti autorità politiche a promuovere tutte le iniziative necessarie, sul piano sia scolastico che politico-economico, a sviluppare coerentemente tali principi, nel contempo acquisendo dati atti a mettere in luce il suesposto stato. Cagliari, 19 Febbraio 1971. Priamo Farris (2016). Problemas e aficàntzias de sa pianificatzioni linguistica in Sardigna. Limba, Istòria, Sotziedadi / Problemi e prospettive della pianificazione linguistica in Sardegna. Lingua, Storia, Società. Youcanprint.) At a time when the Italian "modernisation plans" in Sardinia were in full swing, the Italian government was apprehensive about this deliberation by the University of Cagliari as providing the timber for further ethnic unrest in the state's peripheries. Sergio Salvi's description of the Sardinians as a "forbidden nation" in Italy further contributed to the linguistic question gaining more notoriety at the national level. A first legal draft concerning Sardinian as a language to be legally put on an equal position with Italian was developed by the Sardinian Action Party in 1975. Critical acclaim in Sardinian cultural circles followed the patriotic poem No sias isciau (Note: "O sardu, si ses sardu e si ses bonu, / Semper sa limba tua apas presente: / No sias che isciau ubbidiente / Faeddende sa limba 'e su padronu. / Sa nassione chi peldet su donu / De sa limba iscumparit lentamente, / Massimu si che l'essit dae mente / In iscritura che in arrejonu. / Sa limba 'e babbos e de jajos nostros / No l'usades pius nemmancu in domo / Prite pobera e ruza la creides. / Si a iscola no che la jughides / Po la difunder menzus, dae como / Sezis dissardizende a fizos bostros." ("Oh Sardinian! If you are Sardinian and a good Sardinian as well, you should always keep your language etched in your mind: do not be like a submissive slave, speaking your master's language. The nation that loses the gift of its own language is fated to slowly fade out of existence, especially when it does not come to its mind anymore to write and speak. Not even at home is the language of our ancestors used anymore, for you consider it wretched and uncout. If you do not bring it to be taught in school so as to better spread its use, from now on you are going to be stripping the Sardinian identity out of your children.") In "Piras, Raimondo. No sias isciau".) ("Don't be a slave") by Raimondo (Remundu) Piras some months before his death in 1977, urging bilingual education to reverse the ongoing trend of cultural De-Sardization.

Indeed, during the late 70s reports were released that Sardinian was on course of being abandoned in favour of Italian in the towns and among the younger generation. By then, a significant shift to Italian had been noted in rural Sardinia not only in the Campidanese plain, but even in some inner areas that had been previously considered Sardinian-speaking bastions, manifesting a parallel shift of the values upon which the ethnic and cultural identity of the Sardinians was traditionally grounded. (Note: Gavino Pau, in an article published on La Nuova Sardegna (18 aprile 1978, Una lingua defunta da studiare a scuola "A defunct language to be studied in school"), claimed that "per tutti l'italiano era un'altra lingua nella quale traducevamo i nostri pensieri che, irrefrenabili, sgorgavano in sardo" and went on to conclude that for the Sardinian language "abbiamo vissuto, per essa abbiamo sofferto, per essa viviamo e vivremo. Il giorno che essa morrà, moriremo anche noi come sardi." (cit. in Giovanni Melis Onnis (2014). Fueddariu sardu campidanesu-italianu (PDF). Domus de Janas. p. Presentazione. Archived from the original (PDF) on 3 March 2022.)) From then onwards, the use of Sardinian would continue to recede because of the strongly negative view the Sardinian community developed toward it, assuming a self-belittling attitude which has been described as the emergence of a "minority complex" fairly typical of linguistic minorities. However, by the Eighties the language had become a point of ethnic pride: it also became a tool through which long held grievances towards the central government's failure at delivering better economic and social conditions could be channeled. A contradicting tendency has been noted by observing that, while Sardinian is held in a much more positive light than before, its actual use has notably decreased and keeps doing so.

A law by popular initiative for Sardinian-Italian bilingualism garnered considerable success as it kept gathering thousands of signatures, but was promptly blocked by the Italian Communist Party and thus never implemented. The same Italian Communist Party would later propose, however, another bill of its own initiative "for the protection of the language and culture of the Sardinian people" in 1980. In the end, following tensions and claims of the Sardinian nationalist movement for concrete cultural and political autonomy, including the recognition of the Sardinians as an ethnic and linguistic minority, three separate bills were eventually presented to the Regional Council in the Eighties. In 1981, the Regional Council debated and voted for the introduction of bilingualism in Sardinia for the first time. As pressure by a resolution of the Council of Europe continued to bear on Italian policy-makers for the protection of minorities, a Commission was appointed in 1982 to investigate the issue; the following year, a bill was presented to the Italian Parliament, but without success. One of the first laws approved by the Sardinian legislator with respect to the protection and promotion of the Sardinian language and culture was soon rejected by the Constitutional Court in 1994, which deemed it "exorbitant in a multitude of ways with regard to the supplementary and implementing powers enjoyed by the Region in matters of education"; it was not until 1997 that Sardinian was finally recognized by the regional law (n. 26 of 15 October 1997 "Promotion and enhancement of the culture and language of Sardinia") without there being any recourse from the Italian central government; this law too, however, would prove to be more focused on the traditions and history of the Sardinian people than their language in itself.

A survey conducted by MAKNO in 1984 showed that three-quarters of the Sardinians had a positive attitude towards bilingual education (22% of the interviewees, especially in the Province of Nuoro and Oristano, wanted Sardinian to be compulsory in Sardinian schools, while 54.7% would prefer to see teaching in Sardinian as optional) and official bilingualism like in the Aosta Valley and South Tyrol (62.7% of the population were in favour, 25.9% said no and 11.4% were unsure). Such consensus remains relatively stable to this day; another survey, conducted in 2008, reported that more than half of the interviewees, 57.3%, were in favour of the introduction of Sardinian into schools alongside Italian. More research carried out in 2010 confirmed warm reception among the students' parents to introducing Sardinian at school, even though skepticism circulated around having it taught as the vehicular language of education.

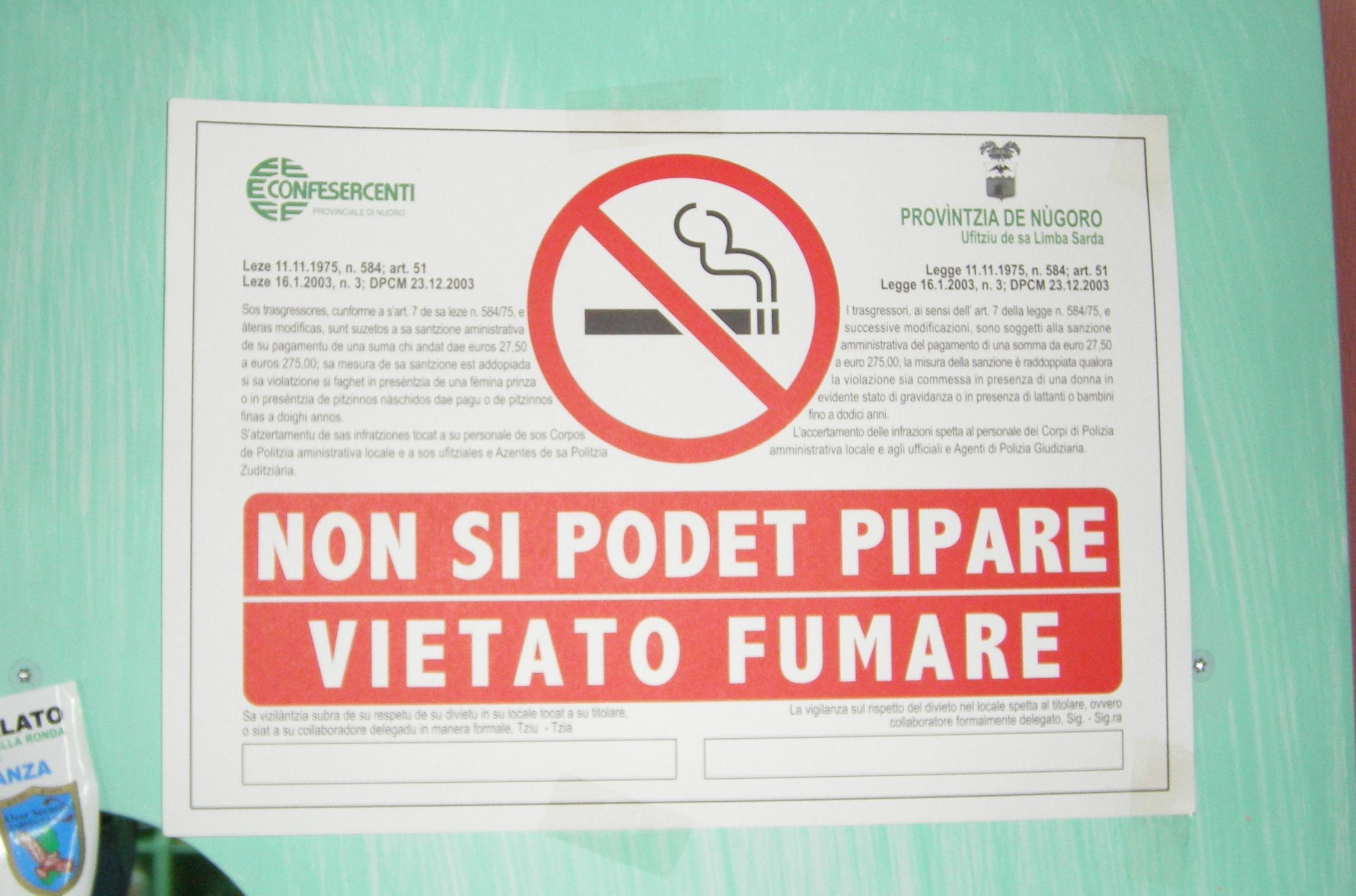
Bilingual no-smoking sign in Sardinian and Italian

In the 1990s, there had been a resurgence of Sardinian-language music, ranging from the more traditional genres (cantu a tenore, cantu a chiterra, gosos etc.) to rock (Kenze Neke, Askra, Tzoku, Tazenda etc.) and even hip-hop and rap (Dr. Drer e CRC Posse, Quilo, Sa Razza, Malam, Su Akru, Menhir, Stranos Elementos, Malos Cantores, Randagiu Sardu, Futta etc.), and with artists who used the language as a means to promote the island and address its long-standing issues and the new challenges. A few films (like Su Re, Bellas Mariposas, Treulababbu, Sonetaula etc.) have also been dubbed in Sardinian, and some others were provided with subtitles in the language. The first scientific work in Sardinian (Sa chistione mundiali de s'Energhia), delving into the question of modern energy supplies, was written by Paolo Giuseppe Mura, Physics Professor at the University of Cagliari, in 1995.

Eventually, sustained activism made possible the ratification by Italy of the European Framework Convention for the Protection of National Minorities in 1998, which would be followed in 1999 by the formal recognition of twelve minority languages (Sardinian, Albanian, Catalan, German, Greek, Slovenian, Croatian, French, Franco-Provençal, Friulian, Ladin and Occitan) through the framework law no. 482, in keeping with the spirit of Art. 6 of the Italian Constitution ("The Republic safeguards linguistic minorities by means of appropriate measures"). While the first section of said law states that Italian is the official language of the Republic, a number of provisions are included to normalize the use of such languages and let them become part of the national fabric. However, Italy (along with France and Malta) has never ratified the European Charter for Regional or Minority Languages. Nevertheless, the law proved to be a positive step towards the legalization of Sardinian as it put at least an end to the ban on the language which had been in effect since the Italian Unification, and was deemed as a starting point, albeit timid, to pursue a more decentralized school curriculum for the island.

Still, some national school books (education has never fallen under the region's remits and is managed by the state at the central level) have not stopped to squeeze the language into the Italian acceptation of dialetto ("Italian dialect") in spite of its actual recognition by the state. Sardinian is yet to be taught at school, with the exception of a few experimental occasions; Mauro Maxia noticed a lack of interest on the part of school managers, some request for Sardinian language classes notwithstanding. Furthermore, its use has not ceased to be disincentivized as antiquated or even indicative of a lack of education, leading many locals to associate it with negative feelings of shame, backwardness, and provincialism. Similar issues of identity have been observed in regard to the community's attitude toward what they positively perceive to be part of "modernity", generally associated with the Italian cultural sphere, as opposed to the Sardinian one, whose aspects have long been stigmatized as "primitive" and "barbarous" by the political and social institutions that ruled the island. Roberto Bolognesi believes that the enduring stigmatisation of Sardinian as the language of the "socially and culturally disadvantaged" classes leads to the nurturing of a vicious circle that further promotes the language's regression, reinforcing its negative judgement among those who perceive themselves as "most competitive": "a perverse mechanism that has condemned and still condemns Sardinian speakers to social marginalisation, systematically excluding them from those linguistic and cultural interactions in which the prestigious registers and high style of language are developed, first and foremost in schools".

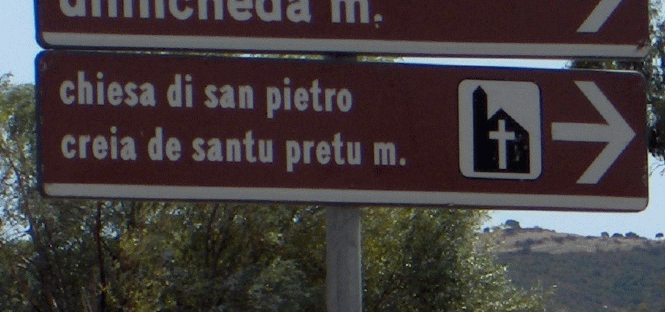
Bilingual Italian–Sardinian road sign in Siniscola

A number of other factors like a considerable immigration flow from mainland Italy, the interior rural exodus to urban areas, where Sardinian is spoken by a much lower percentage of the population, (Note: Similar dynamics led the Irish language to be primarily spoken only in certain areas, known as Gaeltacht (Edwards J., Language, society and identity, Oxford, 1985)) and the use of Italian as a prerequisite for jobs and social advancement actually hinder any policy set up to promote the language. Therefore, following the model proposed by a UNESCO panel of experts in 2003, Sardinian is classified by UNESCO as a "definitely endangered" language ("children no longer learn the language as mother tongue in the home"), on the way to become "severely endangered" ("the language is used mostly by the grandparental generation and up").

Language use is far from stable; following the Expanded GIDS (Expanded Graded Intergenerational Disruption Scale) model, Sardinian would position between 7 ("Shifting: the child-bearing generation knows the language well enough to use it among themselves but none are transmitting it to their children") and 8a ("Moribund: the only remaining active speakers of the language are members of the grandparent generation"). While an estimated 68 percent of the islanders had in fact a good oral command of Sardinian, language ability among the children has plummeted to less than 13 percent; some linguists, like Mauro Maxia, cite the low number of Sardinian-speaking children (with the notable case of a number of villages where Sardinian has ceased to be spoken altogether since 1993) as indicative of language decline, calling Sardinia a case of "linguistic suicide". The depth of the Sardophone networks' increasing assimilation into Italian is illustrated by the latest ISTAT data published in 2017, which confirm Italian as the language that has largely taken root as the means of socialization within Sardinian families (52.1%), relegating the practice of code-switching to 31.5% and the actual use of languages other than Italian to only 15.6%; outside the social circle of family and friends, the numbers define Italian as by far the most prevalent language (87.2%), as opposed to the usage of Sardinian and other languages which has dropped to 2.8%. Today, most people who use Sardinian as part of day-to-day life reside mainly in the sparsely populated areas in the countryside, like the mountainous region of Barbagia.

A bill proposed by the cabinet of the former Italian Prime Minister Mario Monti would have further lowered the protection level of Sardinian, distinguishing between the so-called "national minorities", speaking languages protected by international agreements (German, Slovenian, French) and the "linguistic minorities" whose language is not spoken in any state other than Italy (all the other ethno-linguistic groups, including Sardinian). This bill, which was eventually implemented but later deemed unconstitutional by the Court, triggered a reaction on the island. Students expressed an interest in taking all (or part) of their exit examinations in Sardinian. In response to a 2013 Italian initiative to remove bilingual signs on the island, a group of Sardinians began a virtual campaign on Google Maps to replace Italian place names with the original Sardinian names. After about one month, Google changed the place names back to Italian.

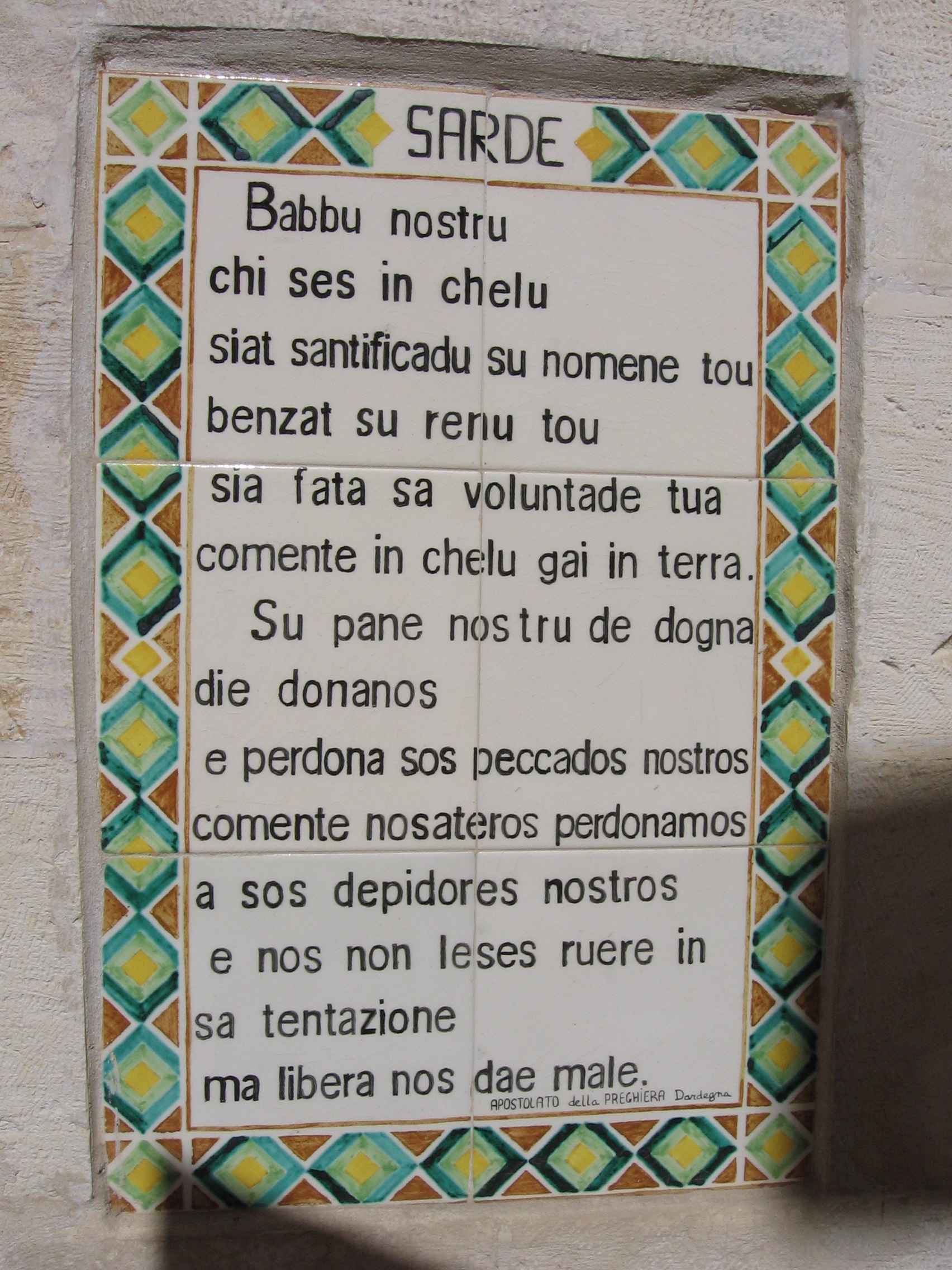
Church of the Pater Noster (Jerusalem), Lord's Prayer plaque in Sardinian

After a signature campaign, it has been made possible to change the language setting on Facebook from any language to Sardinian. It is also possible to switch to Sardinian even in Telegram and a number of other programs, like F-Droid, Diaspora, OsmAnd, Notepad++, QGIS, Swiftkey, Stellarium, Skype, VLC media player for Android and iOS, Linux Mint Debian Edition 2 "Betsy", Firefox etc. The DuckDuckGo search engine is available in Sardinian as well. In 2016, the first automatic translation software from Italian to Sardinian was developed.

In 2015, all the political parties in the Sardinian regional council reached an agreement concerning a series of amendments to the old 1997 law to be able to introduce the optional teaching of the language in Sardinia's schools. The Unified Text on the Discipline of the Regional linguistic policy was eventually approved on 27 June 2018, with the aim of setting in motion a path towards bilingual administration, contributions to bilingual mass media, publishing, IT schools and websites; it also allowed for the foundation of a Sardinian board (Consulta de su Sardu) with thirty experts that would propose a linguistic standard based on the main historical varieties, and would also have advisory duties towards the Regional body. However, said law has yet to be followed up by the respective implementing decrees, the lack of which prevents it from being legally applicable. Some Sardinian language activists and activist groups have also contested the law itself, considering it a political attack on Sardinian made to try to negate its uniformity and to relegate it to folklore, and also noted how its text contains a few parts that could bring the Italian government to challenge it.

In 2021 the Prosecutor of Oristano opened a Sardinian linguistic desk, both to support citizens and to provide advice and translations to magistrates and the police. It has been the first time in Italy in which such a service has been offered to a minority language.

Although there is still not an option to teach Sardinian on the island itself, let alone in Italy, some language courses are instead sometimes available in Germany (University of Stuttgart, LMU Munich, University of Tübingen, University of Mannheim etc.), Spain (University of Girona), Iceland and Czech Republic (Masaryk University). Shigeaki Sugeta also taught Sardinian to his students of Romance languages at the Waseda University in Tokyo (Japan), and would even release a Sardinian–Japanese dictionary out of it.

The Sardinian-speaking community among the other minority language groups officially recognized by Italy

At present, the Sardinian-speaking community is the least protected one in Italy, despite being the largest minority language group officially recognized by the state. In fact the language, which is receding in all domains of use, is still not given access to any field of public life, such as education (Italian–Sardinian bilingualism is still frowned upon, while the local public universities play little, if any, role whatsoever in supporting the language), politics (with the exception of some nationalist groups), justice, administrative authorities and public services, media, and cultural, ecclesiastical, economic and social activities, as well as facilities. In a case presented to the European Commission by the then MEP Renato Soru in 2017, in which he complained of national negligence with regard to the state's own legislation in comparison to other linguistic minorities, the Commission's response pointed out to the Honourable Member that matters of language policy pursued by individual member states do not fall within its competences.

According to a 2017 report on the digital language diversity in Europe, Sardinian appears to be particularly vital on social media as part of many people's everyday life for private use, but such vitality does not still translate into a strong and wide availability of Internet media for the language. In 2017, a 60-hour Sardinian language course was introduced for the first time in Sardinia and Italy at the University of Cagliari, although such a course had been already available in other universities abroad.

In 2015, the Council of Europe commented on the status of national minorities in Italy, noting the approach of the Italian government towards them with the exception of the German, French and Slovenian languages, where Italy has applied full bilingualism due to international agreements; despite the formal recognition from the Italian state, Italy does not in fact collect any information on the ethnic and linguistic composition of the population, apart from South Tyrol. There is also virtually no print and broadcasting media exposure in politically or numerically weaker minorities like Sardinian. Moreover, the resources allocated to cultural projects like bilingual education, which lacks a consistent approach and offers no guarantee of continuity throughout the years, are largely insufficient to meet "even the most basic expectations".

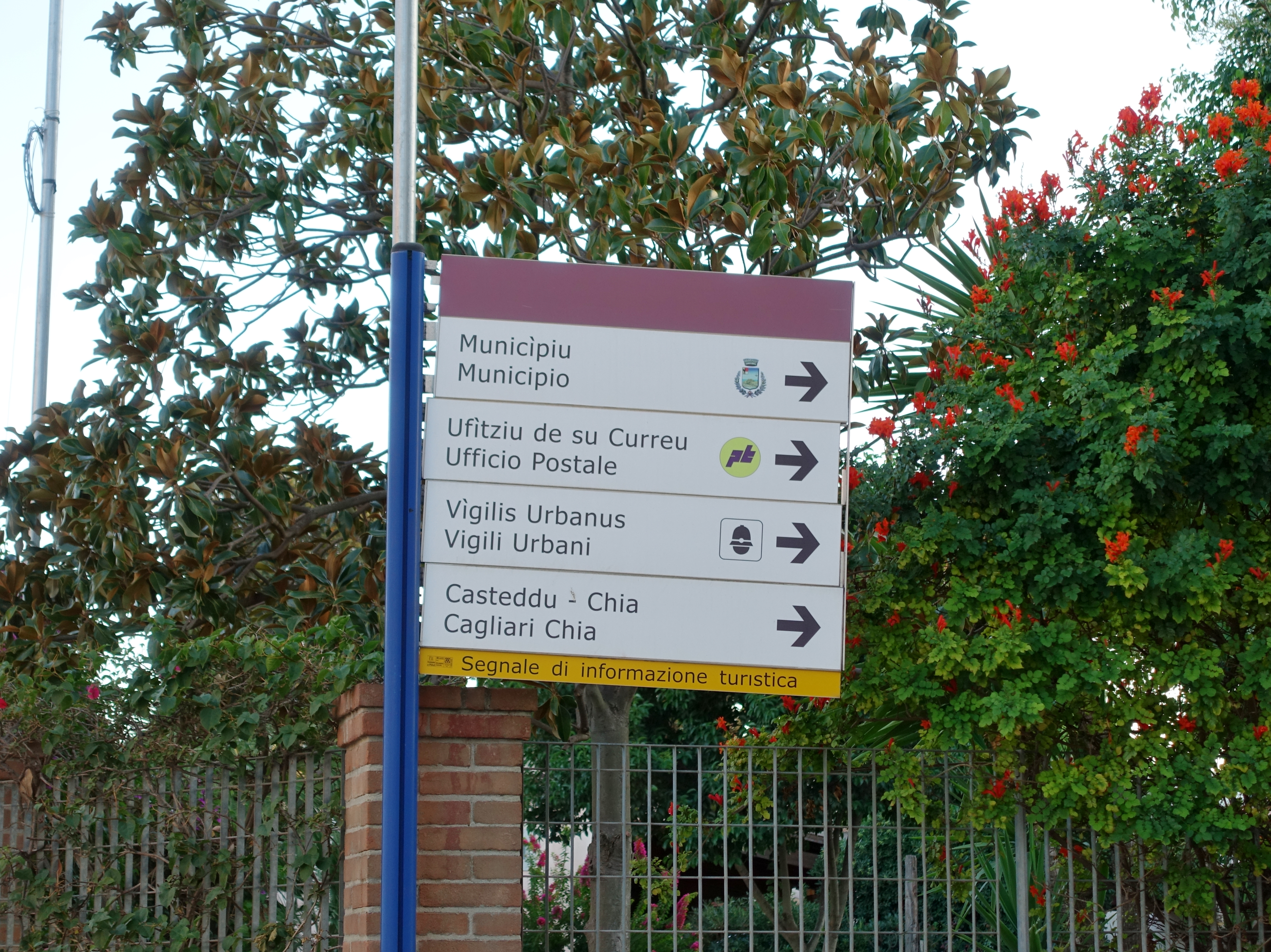
Bilingual road signs in Pula

A solution to the Sardinian question being unlikely to be found anytime soon, the language has become highly endangered: even though the endogamy rate among group members seems to be very high, less than 15 per cent of the Sardinian children use the language to communicate with each other. it appears that the late recognition of Sardinian as a minority language on the part of the state, as well as the gradual but pervasive Italianisation promoted by the latter's education system, the administration system and the media, followed by the intergenerational language replacement, made it so that the vitality of Sardinian has been heavily compromised. The 1995 Euromosaic project, which conducted a research study on the current situation of the ethno-linguistic minorities across Europe under the auspices of the European Commission, concludes their report on Sardinian as follows:

This would appear to be yet another minority language group under threat. The agencies of production and reproduction are not serving the role they did a generation ago. The education system plays no role whatsoever in supporting the language and its production and reproduction. The language has no prestige and is used in work only as a natural as opposed to a systematic process. It seems to be a language relegated to a highly localised function of interaction between friends and relatives. Its institutional base is extremely weak and declining. Yet there is concern among its speakers who have an emotive link to the language and its relationship to Sardinian identity.

— Sardinian language use survey, Euromosaic report

As Matteo Valdes explains, "the island's population sees, day after day, the decline of their original languages. They are complicit in this decline, passing on to their children the language of prestige and power, but at the same time they feel that the loss of local languages is also a loss of themselves, of their history, of their own specific identity or distinctiveness".

With cultural assimilation having already occurred, most of the younger generation of islanders, although they do understand some basic Sardinian, is now in fact Italian monolingual and monocultural as they are not able to speak Sardinian anymore, but simply regional Italian (known amongst Italian linguists as italiano regionale sardo or IrS) which in its lowest diastratic forms is, oftentimes derisively, nicknamed italiànu porcheddìnu (literally "swinish Italian") by native Sardinian speakers. Roberto Bolognesi argues that, in the face of the persistent denial and rejection of the Sardinian language, it is as if the latter "had taken revenge" on its original community of speakers "and continues to do so by "polluting" the hegemonic linguistic system", recalling Gramsci's prophetic warning uttered at the dawn of the previous century. In fact, compared to a now prevalent regional Italian that, according to Bolognesi, "is in fact a hybrid language that has arisen from the contact between two different linguistic systems", "the (little) Sardinian which is used by young people often constitutes an ungrammatical jargon filled with obscenities and constructions belonging to Italian": in other words, the population would therefore only master "two crippled languages" (due lingue zoppe) whose manifestations do not arise from a recognisable norm, nor do they constitute a clear source of linguistic security. Bolognesi believes therefore that the Sardinians' utter "rejection of their original linguistic identity has not entailed the hoped-for and automatic homologation to a more socially prestigious identity, but the acquisition of a second-class identity (neither truly Sardinian nor truly Italian), no longer self-centred but rather peripheral with respect to the sources of linguistic and cultural norms, which still remain beyond their reach: on the other side of the Tyrrhenian Sea".

By contrast, Eduardo Blasco Ferrer has been noted how the Sardinian-speaking community engages only in code-switching and usually takes care in refraining from code-mixing between the two different languages.

Negative attitudes among native speakers have been observed towards second-language learners for speaking "poor Sardinian", an attitude considered to be ethnically grounded on the interaction of in-group and out-group dynamics.

In conclusion, the Sardinian language, while still being described as "viable" in 2003, continues to be adversely affected by pervasive and all-encompassing Italianisation through language shift, and is thus nowadays moribund, albeit its replacement continues at a slower pace than before thanks to the commitment of those who, in various contexts, promote its revaluation in a process that has been defined by some scholars as "linguistic re-Sardization". Still, arrangements for bilingualism exist only on paper and factors such as the intergenerational transmission, which remain essential in the reproduction of the ethnolinguistic group, are severely compromised because of Italianisation; many young speakers, who have been raised in Italian rather than Sardinian, have a command of their ethnic language which does not extend beyond a few stereotyped formulas.

== Phonology ==
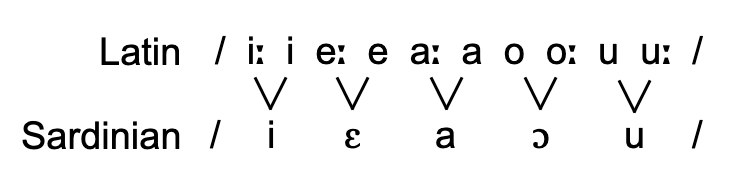
Vowel changes from Latin to early Sardinian

Consonants
		Labial	Dental	Alveolar	Retroflex	Post-alv./ Palatal	Velar
Plosive	voiceless	p	t	t͡s		t͡ʃ†	k
Plosive	voiced	b	d	d͡z	ɖ	d͡ʒ†	ɡ
Fricative	voiceless	f	θ‡	s		ʃ†	
Fricative	voiced	v				ʒ†	
Nasal		m	n			ɲ†	
Vibrant				r			
Approximant		w†		l		j	

† Not present in Nuorese.

‡ Mainly in Nuorese.

Vowels
	Front	Central	Back
Close	i		u
Close-mid	e†		o†
Open-mid	ɛ		ɔ
Open		a	

† /e, o/ allophones of /ɛ, ɔ/ except in Campidanese.

== Grammar ==
Some distinctive features typical of Sardinian include:

=== Nouns ===
- The plural marker is -s (ie, sigmatic plural (from the Latin accusative plural)), as in Western Romance languages like French, Occitan, Catalan, Spanish, Portuguese and Galician: sardu, sardus "Sardinian"; pudda, puddas "hen"; margiane, margianes "fox". In Italo-Dalmatian languages like Italian, or Eastern Romance languages like Romanian, the plural ends with -i, -e or -a (ie, vocalic non-sigmatic plural). However, Sardinian may also change the final vowel.
- The definite article derives from the Latin ipse: su, sa, plural sos, sas (Logudorese & Nuorese) and is (Campidanese). At present, such articles are only common in Balearic Catalan and were once used in Gascon as well, whilst all the other Romance languages make use of forms derived from ille.

==== Noun table ====
Class	Gender	Singular	Plural
I	feminine	sa rosa	sas rosas
II	masculine	su ortu	sos ortos
II	masculine	su oro	sos oros
II	masculine	su tempus	sos tempos
III	masculine	su pane	sos panes
III	feminine	sa muzere	sas muzeres
IV	masculine	su barberi	sos barberis

Exceptions:

- The Nuorese dialect only has 2 genderless nouns (sostantivi promiscui): su cane, sa cane and su gatu, sa gatu.
- Of the first class only three nouns are masculine: su boja, su poeta, su pantarma.
- Although belonging to the second class, the following nouns which in Latin were part of the 4th declension are feminine: acu, domo, ficu, manu.
- The masculine plural form of tottu is tottus.

=== Verbs ===
Sardinian verbs are divided into three main classes, each distinguished by a different infinitive ending (-are, -ere, or -ire). The conjugations of regular verbs in the three main dialects (Nuorese, Logudorese, and Campidanese) are as follows:

Infinitive		cant-	are		ai	tìm-	ere		i	fin-	ire		iri
Gerund		cant-	ande		endi	tim-	ende		endi	fin-	inde		endi
Past Participle		cant-	àu / ada	adu	au	tim-	i(d)u / i(d)a	idu	iu	fin-	ìu / ìa	idu	iu
Indicative	Present	cant- cant- cant- cant- cant- cant-	o as at amus àes an	o as at amus ades ant	u as at aus ais ant	tim- tim- tim- tim- tim- tim-	o es et imus ìes en	o es et imus ides ent	u is it eus eis int	fin- fin- fin- fin- fin- fin-	o is it imus ìes in	o is it imus ides int	u is it eus eis int
Indicative	Imperfect	cant- cant- cant- cant- cant- cant-	abo abas abat abamus abazes aban	aìa aìas aìat aiamus astis ànt	amu àst àt amus aìazis aìant	tim- tim- tim- tim- tim- tim-	ìa ìas ìat iabamus iabazes ìan	ia ias iat iamus iazis iant	emu iast iat emus estis iant	fin- fin- fin- fin- fin- fin-	ìa ìas ìat iabamus iabazes ìan	ia ias iat iamus iazis iant	emu iast iat emus estis iant
Subjunctive	Present	cant- cant- cant- cant- cant- cant-	e es et émus edas en	e es et emus edes ent	i is it eus eis int	tim- tim- tim- tim- tim- tim-	a as at amus ades an	a as at amus ades ant	a as at aus ais ant	fin- fin- fin- fin- fin- fin-	a as at amus azes an	a as at amus ades ant	a as at aus ais ant
Subjunctive	Imperfect	cant- cant- cant- cant- cant- cant-	àre(po) ares aret arémus arezes aren	ere eres eret eremus erezis erent	essi essis essit essimus essidis essint	tim- tim- tim- tim- tim- tim-	ère(po) eres eret erémus erezes eren	ere eres eret eremus erezis erent	essi essis essit essimus essidis essint	fin- fin- fin- fin- fin- fin-	ìre(po) ires iret irémus irezes iren	ire ires iret iremus irezis irent	essi essis essit essimus essidis essint
Imperative		cant- cant-	a àe	a ade	a ai	tim- tim-	e ìe	e ide	i ei	fin- fin-	i ìe	i ide	i ei

=== Syntax ===
Distinctive syntax features include:

- A common occurrence of a left-dislocated construction: cussa cantone apo cantadu ("That song I have sung": that is, "I've sung that song").
  - In yes/no questions, fronting of a constituent (especially a predicative element) is required, though it is not specifically a question-formation process: Cumprendiu m'as? ("Understood me you have", that is, "Have you understood me?"), Mandicatu at? ("Eaten he/she has", that is "Has he/she eaten?"), Fatu l'at ("Done he/she has", that is "He/She's done it"), etc.
- Interrogative phrases might be constructed like echo questions, with the interrogative marker remaining in underlying position: Sunt lòmpios cando? ("They arrived when?", that is, "when did they arrive?"), Juanne at pigadu olias cun chie? ("John has picked olives with whom?"), etc.
- Impersonal sentence constructions are commonly used to replace the passive voice, which is limited to the formal register: A Juanni ddu ant mortu rather than Juanni est istadu mortu.
- The use of non de + noun: non de abba, abbardente est ("not of water brandy it+is": that is, "It is not water, but brandy."); non de frades, parent inimigos ("Not of brothers, they seem enemies": that is, "Far from being brothers, they are like enemies").
- The use of ca (from quia) or chi as subordinate conjunctions: Ja nau ti l'apo ca est issa sa mere ("Already told I have you that is she the boss", that is "I've already told you that it's her the boss").
- Existential uses of àer / ài ("to have") and èsser / essi ("to be"): B'at prus de chentu persones inoghe! ("There is over a hundred people in here!"), Nci funt is pratus in mesa ("There are the plates on the table").
- Ite ("What") + adjective + chi: Ite bellu chi ses! ("What beautiful that (you) are!", that is "How beautiful you are!").
- Nominal syntagmas without having a head: Cussu ditzionariu de gregu est prus mannu de su de Efis ("That Greek dictionary is bigger than Efisio's"), Cudda machina est prus manna de sa de Juanne ("That car is bigger than John's").
- Extraposition of the lexical head: Imprestami su tou de ditzionàriu ("Please lend me your dictionary").
- Ancu + subjunctive as a way to express a (malevolent) wish on someone: Ancu ti falet unu lampu! ("May you be struck by lightning!").
- Prepositional accusative: Apo bidu a Maria ("I've seen Mary").
- Insertion of the affirmative particle ja / giai: Ja m'apo corcau ("I did go to bed").
  - Use of the same particle to express antiphrastic formulas: Jai ses totu istudiatu, tue! ("You're so well educated!", that is, "You are so ignorant and full of yourself!").
- Reflexive use of intransitive verbs: Tziu Pascale si nch'est mortu (Note: As opposed to the transitive use of morrer / morri a..., which means "to kill" instead. E.g.: Pascale at mortu a tziu Bachis ("Pascal has killed uncle Bachisio").) eris sero ("Uncle Pascal passed away yesterday"), Mi nch'apo dormiu pro una parica de oras ("I've slept for a couple of hours").
- Use of àer in reflexive sentences: Si at fertu a s'anca traballende ("He/She injured himself/herself while working").
- Combination of the perfective and progressive verb aspect: Est istadu traballende totu sa die ("He/She has been working all day").
- Continuous and progressive aspect of the verb, which is meant to indicate an effective situation rather than typical or habitual: Non ti so cumprendende ("I don't understand you").
- Relative lack of adverbs: with the exception of some localized words like the Nuorese mescamente ("especially"), as well as some recent loanwords from Italian, all the Sardinian dialects have a number of ways with which to express the meaning conferred to the adverbs by the other Romance languages (e.g. Luchia currit prus a lestru / acoitendi de Maria, "Lucy runs faster than Mary").
- The expression of the deontic modality through a periphrastic form, characterized by the verb "to want" in auxiliary position, a feature also common to Southern Corsican, Sicilian, Moroccan Arabic and Moroccan Berber, in addition to some non-standard varieties of English. (e.g. Su dinare bolet / cheret torradu "money has to be paid back").
- The condaghes seem to demonstrate that unlike other Romance languages, Old Sardinian may have had verb-initial word order, with optional topicalization into the beginning of the sentence. While verb-initial word order is also attested in other old Romance languages, such as Old Venetian, Old French, Old Neapolitan, Old Spanish, Old Sicilian and others, it has been argued that Old Sardinian was alone in licensing verb-initial word order (V1) as the generalized word order, while the others had V1 only as a marked alternative.

=== Vocabulary comparison with other Romance languages ===
English	Late Latin	Sardinian	Corsican	Sicilian	Italian	Spanish	Catalan	French	Portuguese	Romanian
key	clāvem	crae/-i	chjave/chjavi	chiavi	chiave	llave	clau	clé	chave	cheie
night	noctem	note/-i	notte/notti	notti	notte	noche	nit	nuit	noite	noapte
sing	cantāre	cantare/-ai	cantà	cantari	cantare	cantar	cantar	chanter	cantar	cânta
goat	capram	cabra/craba	capra	crapa	capra	cabra	cabra	chèvre	cabra	capră
language	linguam	limba/lìngua	lingua/linga	liṅgua	lingua	lengua	llengua	langue	língua	limbă
plaza	plateam	pratza	piazza	chiazza	piazza	plaza	plaça	place	praça	piață
bridge	pontem	ponte/-i	ponte/ponti	punti	ponte	puente	pont	pont	ponte	pod, punte
church	ecclēsiam	crèsia/ecresia	ghjesgia	cresia/chiesa	chiesa	iglesia	església	église	igreja	biserică
hospital	hospitālem	ispidale/spidali	spedale/uspidali	spitali	ospedale	hospital	hospital	hôpital	hospital	spital
cheese	cāseum (fōrmāticum)	casu	casgiu	tumazzu	formaggio, cacio	queso	formatge	fromage	queijo	brânză, caș

== Varieties ==
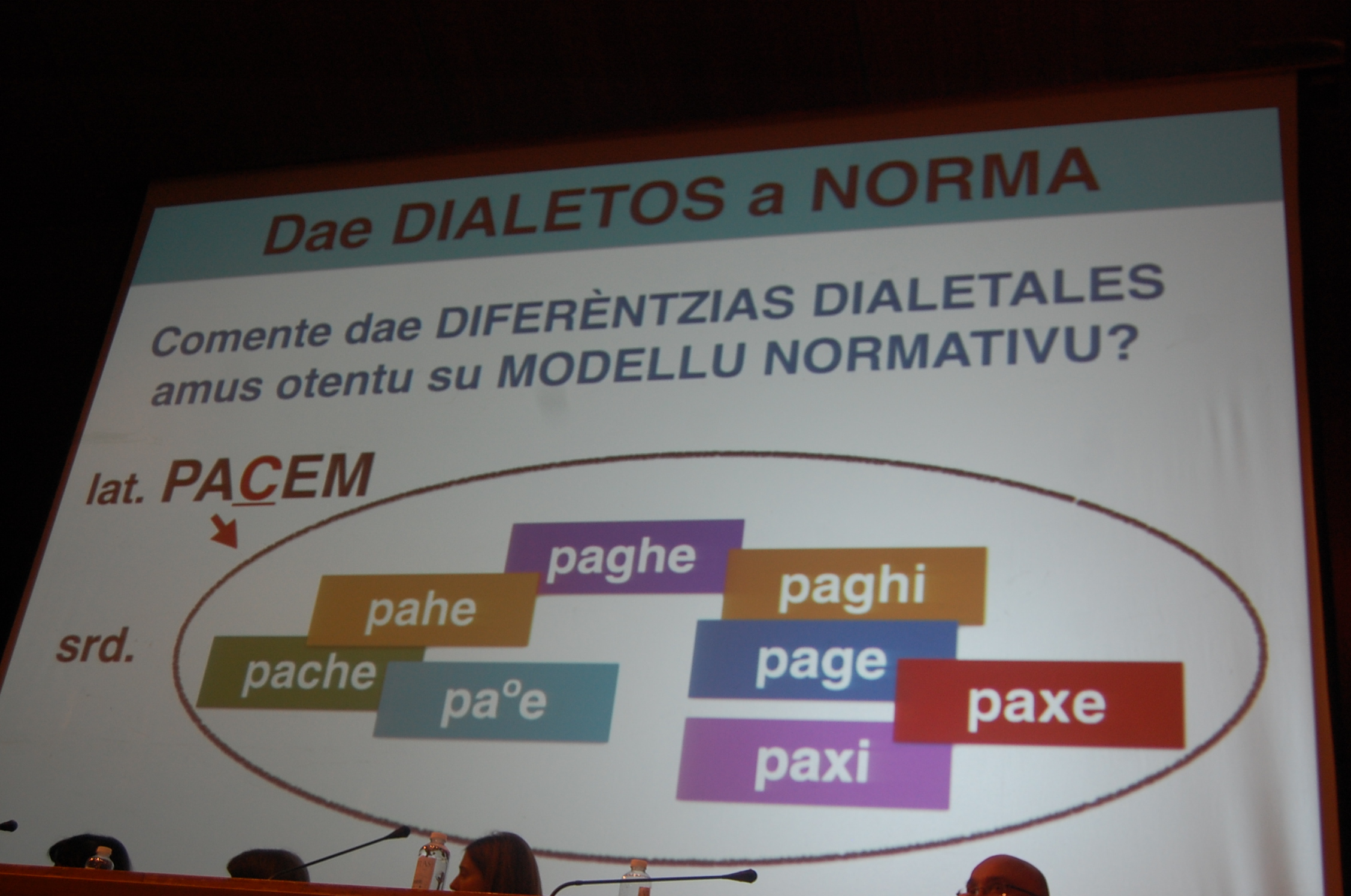
The word for "peace" in all the varieties of Sardinian

Historically, the Sardinians have always been a small-numbered population scattered across isolated cantons, sharing demographic patterns similar to the neighbouring Corsica; as a result, Sardinian developed a broad spectrum of dialects over the time. Starting from Francesco Cetti's description in the 18th century, Sardinian has been presented as a pluricentric language, being traditionally subdivided into two standardized varieties spoken by roughly half of the entire community: the dialects spoken in North-Central Sardinia, centered on the orthography known as Logudorese (su sardu logudoresu), and the dialects spoken in South-Central Sardinia, centered on another orthography called Campidanese (su sardu campidanesu).

All the Sardinian dialects differ primarily in phonetics, which does not considerably hamper intelligibility; the view of there being a dialectal boundary rigidly separating the two varieties of High Sardinian has been in fact subjected to more recent research, which shows a fluid dialect continuum from the northern to the southern ends of the island. The dualist perception of the Sardinian dialects, rather than pointing to an actual isogloss, is in fact the result of a psychological adherence to the way Sardinia was administratively subvidided into a Caput Logudori (Cabu de Susu) and a Caput Calaris (Cabu de Jossu) by the Spanish.

The dialects centered on the "Logudorese Sardinian model" are generally considered more conservative, with the Nuorese dialect of Sardinian (su sardu nugoresu) being deemed the most conservative of all. They have all retained the classical Latin pronunciation of the stop velars (chena versus cena, "supper"), the front middle vowels (compare Campidanese iotacism, probably from Byzantine Greek) and assimilation of close-mid vowels (cane versus cani, "dog" and gatos versus gatus, "cats"). Labio-velars become plain labials (limba versus lìngua, "language" and abba versus acua, "water"). I is prosthesized before consonant clusters beginning in s (iscala versus Campidanese Sardinian scala, "stairway" and iscola versus scola, "school"). An east-west strip of villages in central Sardinia, mainly in the central part of the Province of Oristano, and central part of the Province of Nuoro, speaks a transitional group of dialects (su sardu de mesania). Examples include is limbas (the languages) and is abbas (the waters). The dialects centered on the Campidanese model, spreading from Cagliari (once the metropolis of the Roman province), show relatively more influences from Carthage, Rome, Constantinople and Late Latin. Examples include is frùminis (the rivers) and is domus (the houses).

Some dialects of Sardinian from the extreme ends of the aforementioned continuum have been estimated in another research to have 88% of matches in 110-item wordlist, similarly to the 85–88% number of matches between Provençal Occitan and some Catalan dialects which by some standards is usually (even though arbitrarily) considered characteristic for two different, albeit very closely related, languages. ISO 639 counts four Sardinian languages (Campidanese, Gallurese, Logudorese and Sassarese), each with its own language code.

Non-Sardinian language varieties spoken in Sardinia

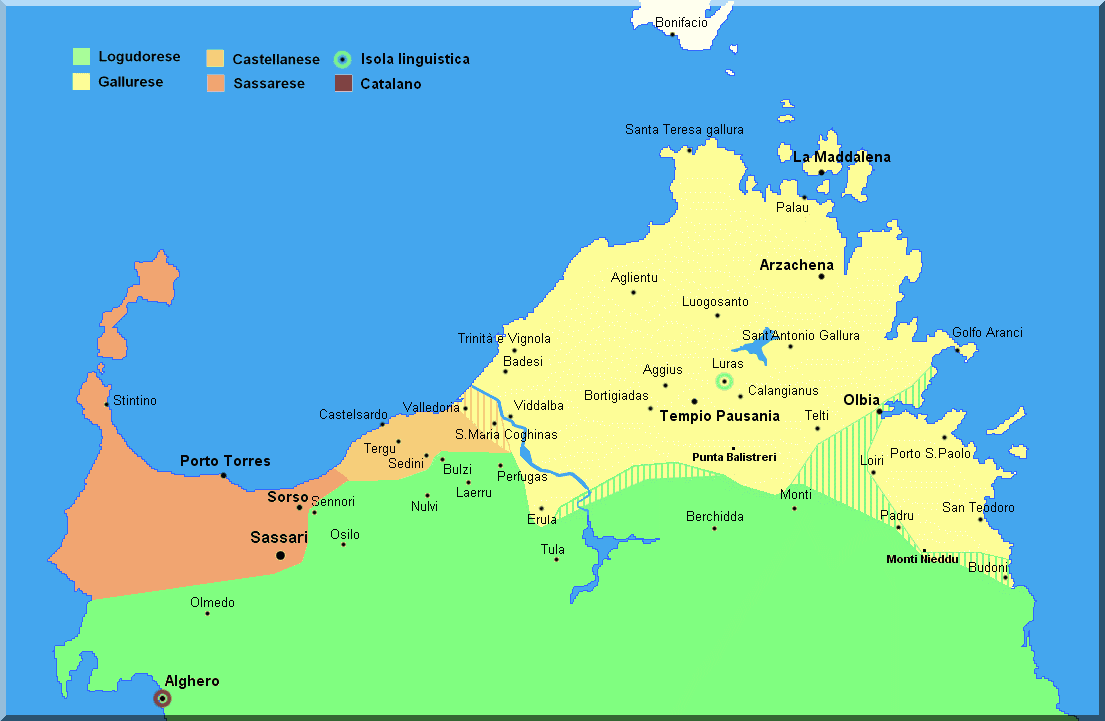
Corso-Sardinian (orange and yellow) with regard to Sardinian proper (green)

Sardinian is the indigenous and historical language of most Sardinian communities. However, Sardinian is not spoken as the native and primary language in a significant number of other ones, roughly amounting to 20% of the Sardinian population; Sassari, the second-largest city on Sardinia and the main center of the northern half of the island, is amongst the latter. The aforementioned Gallurese and Sassarese, despite being often colloquially considered part of Sardinian, are two Corso-Sardinian transitional languages; they are spoken in the northernmost part of Sardinia, although some Sardinian is also understood by the majority of people living therein (73.6% in Gallura and 67.8% in the Sassarese-speaking subregion).

Francesco Cetti, responsible for the dialectal partition of the Sardinian language in his early dissertation, went on to deem these Corso-Sardinian varieties spoken in the island "foreign" (i.e. not indigenous to Sardinia) and therefore "not national" (i.e. non-Sardinian) in that he averred they would be "an Italian dialect, much more Tuscan in fact than the vast majority of Italy's dialects themselves".

There are also two language islands, the Catalan Algherese-speaking community from the inner city of Alghero (northwest Sardinia) and the Ligurian-speaking towns of Carloforte, in San Pietro Island, and Calasetta in Sant'Antioco island (south-west Sardinia).

=== Sample of text ===
English

Our Father, who art in heaven,
hallowed be thy name.
thy kingdom come,
thy will be done,
on earth as it is in heaven.
Give us this day our daily bread,
and forgive us our debts,
as we forgive our debtors.
And lead us not into temptation,
but deliver us from evil.

Logudorese Sardinian

Babbu nostru chi ses in chelu,
Santificadu siat su nomine tou.
Benzat a nois su rennu tou,
Siat fata sa boluntade tua,
comente in chelu gai in terra.
Dona nos oe su pane nostru de donzi die,
Et perdona nos sos pecados nostros,
Comente nois perdonamus a sos depidores nostros.
Et no nos lesses ruer in tentatzione,
Et libera nos dae male.

Campidanese Sardinian

Babbu nostu chi ses in celu,
Santificau siat su nomini tuu.
Bengiat a nosus su regnu tuu,
Siat fata sa boluntadi tua,
comenti in celu aici in terra.
Donasi oi su pani nostu de dogna dii,
Et perdonasi is pecaus nostus,
Comenti nosus perdonaus a is depidoris nostus.
Et no si lessis arrui in tentatzioni,
Et liberasi de mali.

LSC (Sardinian Written Standard)

Babbu nostru chi ses in chelu,
Santificadu siat su nòmine tuo.
Bèngiat a nois su rennu tuo,
Siat fata sa voluntade tua,
comente in chelu gasi in terra.
Dona·nos oe su pane nostru de ònnia die,
E perdona·nos is pecados nostros,
Comente nois perdonamus a is depidores nostros.
E no nos lasses arrùere in tentatzione,
E lìbera·nos de male.

Latin

Pater noster qui es in cælis,
sanctificetur nomen tuum.
adveniat regnum tuum,
fiat voluntas tua,
sicut in cælo et in terra.
Panem nostrum quotidianum da nobis hodie,
et dimitte nobis debita nostra,
sicut et nos dimittimus debitoribus nostris.
et ne nos inducas in tentationem
sed libera nos a malo.

Italian

Padre Nostro, che sei nei cieli,
Sia santificato il tuo nome.
Venga il tuo regno,
Sia fatta la tua volontà,
Come in cielo, così in terra.
Dacci oggi il nostro pane quotidiano,
E rimetti a noi i nostri debiti
Come noi li rimettiamo ai nostri debitori.
E non abbandonarci alla tentazione,
Ma liberaci dal male.

Article 1 of the Universal Declaration of Human Rights in Sardinian:

Totu sos èsseres umanos naschint lìberos e eguales in dinnidade e in deretos. Issos tenent sa resone e sa cussèntzia e depent operare s'unu cun s'àteru cun ispìritu de fraternidade.

Article 1 of the Universal Declaration of Human Rights in English:

All human beings are born free and equal in dignity and rights. They are endowed with reason and conscience and should act towards one another in a spirit of brotherhood.

== Standardization ==
Until 2001, there was not a unifying orthographic standard available for all the dialects of Sardinian, neither in the literary nor in the oral domain (one designed for the latter does not exist to this day).

After the Middle Ages, where a certain orthographic uniformity can be observed, the only steps to provide the language with a single standard, called "illustrious Sardinian", were undertaken by such writers as Hieronimu Araolla, Ioan Mattheu Garipa and Matteo Madau, who had based their works on the model of medieval Sardinian. However, attempts to formalise and spread this orthography would be hindered by the Iberian and later Savoyard authorities.

The dialectally fragmented nature of the language is such that it is popularly contended that Sardinian is divided into two or more groups, which have provided themselves with a series of traditional orthographies already, albeit with many changes over the time. While this belief is not grounded on linguistic considerations, it is however motivated by political and social reasons.

In addition to the orthographies commonly referred to as "Logudorese" and "Campidanese", the Nuorese orthography, the Arborense one and even those restricted to individual towns were also developed, sometimes finding common ground with some general rules, such as those required by the Ozieri Award. It is often the case, however, that speakers who are not commonly taught the Sardinian language and are thus literate only in Italian, for lack of a bilingual education, transcribe their local spelling following rules pertaining to the latter rather than the former.

However, some attempts have been made to introduce a single orthographic form for administrative purposes over the recent decades; said form does not aim to refer to morphology and syntax, which is already fairly homogeneous, but concerns itself primarily with spelling.

To allow for an effective implementation of the provisions on the language, as per the regional law no. 26/1997 and the national law no. 482/1999, the Sardinian Autonomous Region arranged for a commission of experts to elaborate a standard capable of overcoming the hurdle posed by the dialectal differences and thereby providing a unified writing system. A first proposal (the LSU: Limba Sarda Unificada, published on 28 February 2001) was tabled, which identified a model language of reference (based on the analysis of local varieties of Sardinian and on the selection of the most representative and compatible models) so as to guarantee the necessary characteristics of certainty, coherence, univocity, and supra-local diffusion. The people appointed for the task were Eduardo Blasco Ferrer, Roberto Bolognesi, Diego Salvatore Corraine, Ignazio Delogu, Antonietta Dettori, Giulio Paulis, Massimo Pittau, Tonino Rubattu, Leonardo Sole, Heinz Jürgen Wolf, and Matteo Porru acting as the Committee's secretary. This study, although scientifically valid, has never been adopted at an institutional level: critics argued that it was an "artificial" system "imposed" on Sardinian speakers.

Nevertheless, the LSU would act as a springboard for a subsequent drafting proposal, this time drawn by a new Committee composed of Giulio Angioni, Roberto Bolognesi, Manlio Brigaglia, Michel Contini, Diego Corraine, Giovanni Lupinu, Anna Oppo, Giulio Paulis, Maria Teresa Pinna Catte and Mario Puddu. The new project continued to be worked on, going by the name of LSC (Limba Sarda Comuna). The new experimental standard proposal, published in 2006, was characterised by taking the mesania (transitional) varieties as reference, and welcoming elements of the spoken language so as to be perceived as a more "natural" mediation; it also ensured that the common orthography would be provided with the characteristics of over-dialectality and supra-municipality, while being open to integrating the phonetic peculiarities of the local variants. Despite this, there was some criticism for this norm as well, both by those who proposed amendments to improve it, and by those who preferred to insist with the idea of dividing Sardinian into two macro-variants with their own separate orthographies.

The Sardinian Regional Government, with the resolution of the Regional Council n. 16/14 of 18 April 2006 "Limba Sarda Comuna. Adoption of the reference standards of an experimental nature for the written language output of the Regional Administration", has experimentally adopted the LSC as the official orthography for the acts and documents issued by the Region of Sardinia (even if, as per Article 8 of the national Law no. 482/99, only the text written in Italian has legal value), giving citizens the right to write to the Public Administration in their own variety and establishing the regional language desk Ufitziu de sa Limba Sarda. The resolution does not aim to impose the guide and further notes that it is "open to integrations" and that "all solutions are of equal linguistic value".

In the following years, the Region has abided by the LSC standard in the translation of many documents and resolutions and in many other areas. In addition, the LSC standard has been adopted on a voluntary basis by many other institutions, schools and media, often in a complementary manner with orthographic norms closer to the local spelling. Regarding these uses, a percentage estimate was made, considering only the projects financed or co-financed by the Region for the diffusion of the Sardinian language in the municipal and supra-municipal language offices, for the teaching in schools and the media from 2007 to 2013.

The monitoring, by the Sardinian Language and Culture Service of the Department of Public Education, was published on the website of the Sardinian Autonomous Region in April 2014. Regarding the school projects financed in 2013, for example, it appears that there was a clear preference, in schools, for the use of the LSC orthographic standard together with a local spelling (51%), compared to the exclusive use of the LSC (11%) or the exclusive use of a local spelling (33%).

On the other hand, regarding the editorial projects in Sardinian language in the regional media, financed by the Region in 2012, we find a greater presence of the LSC (which could derive from a reward of 2 points in the formation of the rankings to take funding, a reward that was not present in the notice for schools). According to those data, it appears that 35% of textual production in media projects was in LSC, 35% in LSC and in local spellings and 25% in local spellings only.

The local language offices, co-financed by the Regional Government, in 2012 used LSC in 50% of their writing, LSC together with local spelling for 9% and local spellings for 41%.

A recent research on the use of the LSC orthography in schools, carried out in the municipality of Orosei, showed that the students of the local middle school had no problem using that standard despite the fact that the Sardinian they spoke was partly different. No pupil rejected it or considered it "artificial", a thing that proved its validity as a didactic tool. The results were first presented in 2016 and published in an article in 2021.

== Surnames, given names, and toponyms ==
From the Sardinian language stem both the historical Sardinian given names, which the natives used to confer on each other until contemporary times, as well as most of the traditional surnames still common on the island. Sardinian place names have a very ancient history and, in some cases, have originated a significant debate about their origins.

== See also ==
- Help:IPA/Sardinian
- Paleo-Sardinian language
- Southern Romance
- Traditional writing forms of Sardinian: Logudorese, Campidanese
- Non-Sardinian languages spoken on Sardinia: Sassarese, Gallurese, Algherese, Tabarchino
- Sardinian surnames

== Bibliography ==
- Argiolas, Mario; Serra, Roberto. 2001. Limba lingua language: lingue locali, standardizzazione e identità in Sardegna nell'era della globalizzazione. Cagliari: CUEC.
- Baroncelli, Stefania; Caretti, Paolo; Rosini, Monica; Louvin, Roberto. 2017. Regioni a statuto speciale e tutela della lingua: Quale apporto per l'integrazione sociale e politica?. Turin: Giappichelli.
- Blasco Ferrer, Eduardo. 2002. Linguistica sarda: Storia, metodi, problemi. Cagliari: Condaghes.
- Blasco Ferrer, Eduardo. 2010. Paleosardo: Le radici linguistiche della Sardegna neolitica. Berlin: De Gruyter.
- Blasco Ferrer, Eduardo; Koch, Peter; Marzo, Daniela. 2017. Manuale di linguistica sarda. Berlin: De Gruyter.
- Bolognesi, Roberto. 1998. The phonology of Campidanian Sardinian: A unitary account of a self-organizing structure. Amsterdam: HIL.
- Bolognesi, Roberto; Heeringa, Wilbert. 2005. Sardegna tra tante lingue: Il contatto linguistico in Sardegna dal Medioevo a oggi. Cagliari: Condaghes.
- Bolognesi, Roberto. 2013. Le identità linguistiche dei sardi. Cagliari: Condaghes, 2013.
- Brigaglia, Manlio. 1982. La Sardegna. 1. La geografia, la storia, l'arte e la letteratura. Cagliari: Edizioni Della Torre.
- Brigaglia, Manlio. 1982. La Sardegna. 2. La cultura popolare, l'economia, l'autonomia. Cagliari: Edizioni Della Torre.
- Cardia, Amos. 2004. Apedala dimòniu!. Cagliari: I Sardi.
- Cardia, Amos. 2006. S'italianu in Sardìnnia. Ghilarza: Iskra.
- Casula, Francesco. 2010. La Lingua sarda e l'insegnamento a scuola. Quartu Sant'Elena: Alfa.
- Casula, Francesco. 2011–2013. Letterature e civiltà della Sardegna. 2 vols. Dolianova: Grafia del Parteolla. ISBN 978-88-96778-61-6.
- Contarini, Silvia; Marras, Margherita; Pias, Giuliana. 2012. L'identità sarda del XXI secolo: Tra globale, locale e postcoloniale. Nuoro: Il Maestrale.
- Contini, Michele. 1987. Etude de géographie phonétique et de phonétique instrumentale du sarde. Alessandria: Edizioni dell'Orso.
- Corongiu, Giuseppe. 2013. Il sardo: Una lingua "normale": Manuale per chi non ne sa nulla, non conosce la linguistica e vuole saperne di più o cambiare idea. Cagliari: Condaghes. ISBN 978-88-7356-214-6. OCLC 856863696.
- Corongiu, Giuseppe. 2020. A dies de oe. Annotos pro una limba sarda tzìvica e cuntemporànea. Cagliari: Condaghes.
- Farina, Luigi. 1987. Bocabolariu Sardu Nugoresu-Italianu. Sassari: Gallizzi.
- Hubschmid, Johannes. 1953. Sardische Studien: Das mediterrane Substrat des Sardischen, seine Beziehungen zum Berberischen und Baskischen sowie zum eurafrikanischen und hispano-kaukasischen Substrat der romanischen Sprachen. Bern: Francke.
- Ingrassia, Giorgia; Blasco Ferrer, Eduardo. 2009. Storia della lingua sarda. Cagliari: CUEC.
- Jones, Michael Allen. 1988. Sardinian. In Harris, Martin; Vincent, Nigel (eds.), The Romance languages, 314–350. London: Routledge.
- Jones, Michael Allen. 1993. Sardinian syntax. London: Routledge.
- Kamps, Bernd Sebastian; Lepori, Antoni. Sardisch für Mollis & Müslis. 1985. Wuppertal: Steinhäuser.
- Loporcaro, Michele. 2015. Vowel length from Latin to Romance. Oxford University Press.
- Lepori, Antonio. 1980. Vocabolario moderno sardo-italiano: 8400 vocaboli. Cagliari: CUEC.
- Lepori, Antonio. 1983. Zibaldone campidanese. Cagliari: Castello.
- Lepori, Antonio. 1987. Fueddàriu campidanesu de sinònimus e contràrius. Cagliari: Castello.
- Lepori, Antonio. 1988. Dizionario Italiano-Sardo (Campidanese). Cagliari: Castello.
- Lepori, Antonio. 2001. Gramàtiga sarda po is campidanesus. Quart Sant'Elena: C.R.
- Lepori, Antonio. 2005. Stòria lestra de sa literadura sarda. Quartu Sant'Elena: C.R.
- Mameli, Francesco. 1998. Il logudorese e il gallurese. Vilanova Monteleone: Soter.
- Marci, Giuseppe. 2005. In presenza di tutte le lingue del mondo: Letterature sarda. Cagliari: CUEC.
- Marongiu, Maria Antonietta. 2019. Situazione sociolinguistica in Sardegna. In Corsale, Andrea; Sistu, Giovanni (eds.), Sardegna: Geografie di un'isola, 195–214. Milan: Franco Angeli.
- Maxia, Mauro. 2006. Lingua limba linga: Indagine sull'uso dei codici linguistici in tre comuni della Sardegna settentrionale. Cagliari: Condaghes.
- Maxia, Mauro. 2010. La situazione sociolinguistica nella Sardegna settentrionale. In Sa Diversidade de sas Limbas in europa, Itàlia, e Sardigna, Atos de sa cunferèntzia regionale de sa limba sarda, Macumere, 28–30 Santandria 2008. Casteddu: Regione Autònoma de Sardigna.
- Mensching, Guido. 1992. Einführung in die sardische Sprache. Bonn: Romanistischer Verlag.
- Mensching, Guido; Remberger, Eva-Maria. 2016. Sardinian. In Ledgeway, Adam & Maiden, Martin (eds.), The Oxford guide to the Romance languages, 270–291. Oxford University Press.
- Mercurio, Giuseppe. 1997. S'Allega Baroniesa. La parlata Sardo-Baroniese: Fonetica, morfologia, sintassi. Milan: Ghedini.
- Mongili, Alessandro. 2015. Topologie postcoloniali: Innovazione e modernizzazione in Sardegna. Cagliari: Condaghes.
- Mura, Riccardo; Virdis, Maurizio. 2015. Caratteri e strutture fonetiche, fonologiche e prosodiche della lingua sarda. Cagliari: Condaghes.
- Ong, Brenda Man Qing; Perono Cacciafoco, Francesco. 2022. Unveiling the Enigmatic Origins of Sardinian Toponyms. Languages, 7, 2, 131: 1–19, Paper, DOI: https://doi.org/10.3390/languages7020131.
- Paulis, Giulio. 1987. I nomi di luogo della Sardegna. Sassari: Carlo Delfino.
- Paulis, Giulio. 1992. I nomi popolari delle piante in Sardegna: Etimologia, storia, tradizioni. Sassari: Delfino.
- Pili, Marcello. 2004. Novelle lanuseine: poesie, storia, lingua, economia della Sardegna. Ariccia: Legatoria del Sud.
- Pira, Michelangelo. 1984. Sardegna tra due lingue. Cagliari: Della Torre.
- Pittau, Massimo. 1972. Grammatica del sardo-nuorese: Il più conservativo dei parlari neolatini. Bologna: Pàtron.
- Pittau, Massimo. 1991. Grammatica della lingua sarda: Varietà logudorese. Sassari: Delfino.
- Pittau, Massimo. 1997. I nomi di paesi città regioni monti fiumi della Sardegna. Cagliari: Gasperini.
- Pittau, Massimo. 2001. La lingua sardiana o dei protosardi. Cagliari: Gasperini.
- Pittau, Massimo. 2000–2003. Dizionario della lingua sarda: fraseologico ed etimologico. 2 vols. Cagliari: Gasperini.
- Porru, Vincenzo Raimondo. 1811. Saggio di grammatica sul dialetto sardo meridionale. Cagliari: Reale Stamperia.
- Porru, Vincenzo Raimondo. 1832. Nou dizionariu universali sardu-italianu. Casteddu: Tipografia Arciobispali.
- Rindler Schjerve, Rosita. 2007. Code-switching nel sardo: Un segno di disintegrazioni o ristrutturazione socio-linguistica?. In Iliesci, Maria; Siller, Heidi; Danler, Paul (eds.), Actes du XXVe Congrès International de Philologie et de Linguistique Romanes 7, 207–215. Berlin: De Gruyter.
- Rohlfs, Gerhard. 1970. Le gascon: Études de philologie pyrénéenne. 2nd ed. Tübingen: Max Niemeyer.
- Rubattu, Antonino. 2001–2004. Dizionario universale della lingua di Sardegna. Sassari: Edes.
- Spano, Giovanni. 1840. Ortografia sarda nazionale ossia grammatica della lingua logudorese paragonata all'italiana dal sacerd. professore Giovanni Spano. Cagliari: Reale Stamperia.
- Spano, Giovanni. 1851–1852. Vocabolario sardo-italiano e italiano-sardo coll'aggiunta dei proverbi sardi. 2 vols. Cagliari: Tipografia Nazionale.
- Sugeta, Shigeaki. 2000. Su bocabolariu sinotticu nugoresu-giapponesu-italianu: Sas 1500 paragulas fundamentales de sa limba sarda. Cagliari: Della Torre.
- Sugeta, Shigeaki. 2010. Cento tratti distintivi del sardo tra le lingue romanze: Una proposta. In Iliescu, Maria; Siller, Heidi; Danler, Paul (eds.), Actes du XXVe Congrès International de Philologie et de Linguistique Romanes 7, 217–227. Berlin: De Gruyter.
- Tola, Salvatore. 2006. La letteratura in lingua sarda: Testi, autori, vicende. Cagliari: CUEC.
- Tola, Salvatore. 2006. 50 anni di premi letterari in lingua sarda. Selargius: Domus de Janas. ISBN 88-88569-61-8. OCLC 77504100.
- Virdis, Maurizio. 2019. La Sardegna e la sua lingua: Studi e saggi. Milano: Franco Angeli.
- Wagner, Max Leopold. 1941. Historische Lautlehre des Sardinischen. Halle (Saale): Niemayer.
- Wagner, Max Leopold. 1951. La lingua sarda: Storia, spirito e forma. Berne: Francke.
- Wagner, Max Leopold. 1960–1964. Dizionario etimologico sardo. 3 vols. Heidelberg: Carl Winter.
- Wolf, Heinz Jürgen. 1998. Toponomastica barbaricina: I nomi di luogo dei comuni di Fonni, Gavoi, Lodine, Mamoiada, Oliena, Ollolai, Olzai, Orgòsolo, Ovodda. Nuoro: Insula.
