= List of ancient Corsican and Sardinian tribes =

This is a list of ancient Corsican and Sardinian tribes, listed in order of ethnic kinship or the general area in which they lived. Some closely fit the concept of a tribe. Others are confederations or even unions of tribes.

== Overview ==
Before the Roman conquest in the 3rd century BC, the islands of Corsica and Sardinia were inhabited by three main peoples or ethnic groups, the Corsi, the Balares, and the Ilienses, each of them divided into several tribes. With the Roman conquest, the province of Sardinia and Corsica was created, becoming the second province of the Roman Republic to be created after that of Sicily.

The ethnic and linguistic affiliation (Paleo-Sardinian language) of the Nuragic people and tribes remains to be further studied, moreover "Nuragic" might have also been a geographical and historical name designating different peoples and languages, rather than indicating a single origin. Current knowledge indicates that they may have been related to the Iberians and the ancient Basque: these peoples were Pre-Indo-Europeans and spoke Pre-Indo-European languages, Proto-Basque (the ancestor of modern Basque) and Iberian. There is also the possibility that the Nuragic peoples may have been related to the Etruscans and other Tyrsenian peoples and languages. One of the Sea Peoples (the Shardana or Sherden) may have been either a population hailing from Sardinia (Ugas 2005, 2016) or a group of tribes that migrated to the island in the Late Bronze Age (Sandars 1978).

If the Corsi, dwelling in Corsica and in the northernmost tip of Sardinia (Gallura), were a subset of the Ligurians and a group of tribes (they probably were an Indo-European people related to the Celts), then they would have been of a different ethnic and linguistic affiliation from the majority of the tribes of Sardinia (although Emidio De Felice found similarities between Paleo-Sardinian and Ancient Ligurian).

The ancient Sardinian and Corsican tribes are the ancestors of most present-day native Sardinians and Corsicans, and their language or languages, like Paleo-Sardinian and Paleo-Corsican, are the substrate of the modern Sardinian and Corsican languages, now part of the Neo-Latin branch.

== Ancient Corsican and Sardinian tribes ==
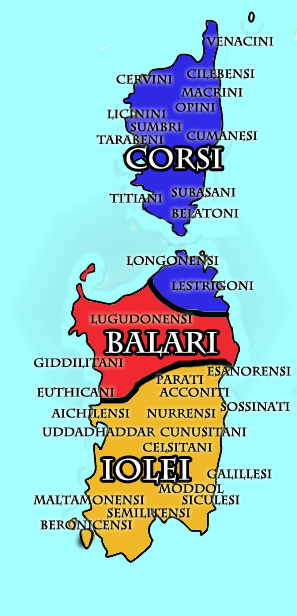
Ancient peoples and tribes of Corsica and Sardinia; in blue the land dwelt by the Corsi, in red the land dwelt by the Balares (Balari), in yellow the land dwelt by the Ilienses (Iolei) (tribes' names are in Italian and not in Latin).

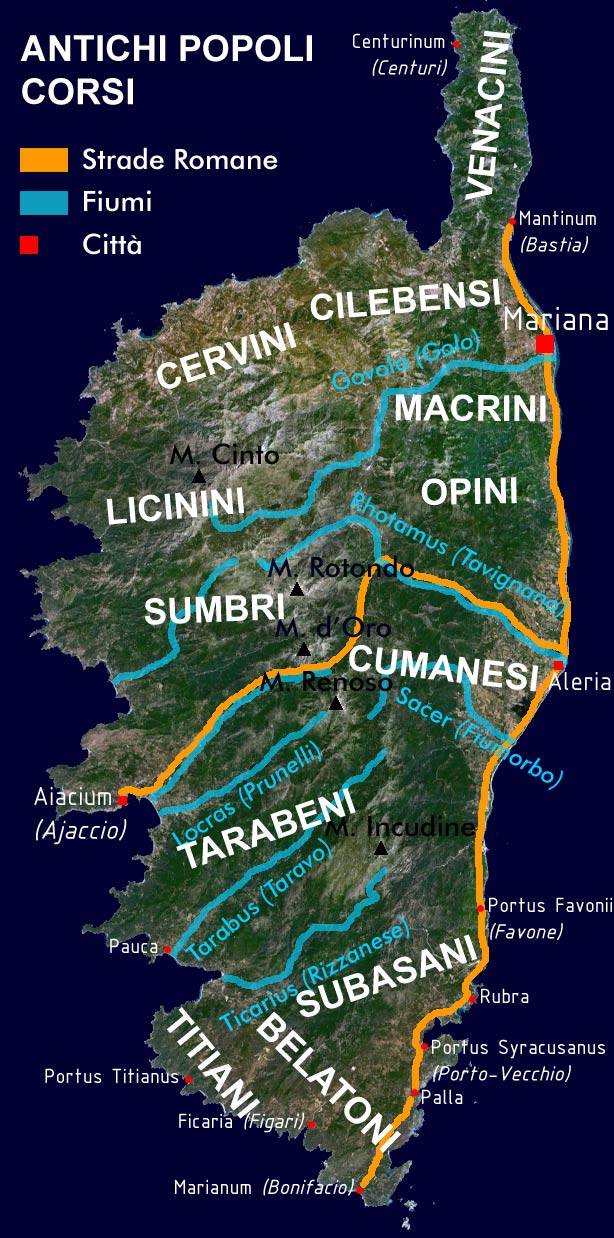
Ancient tribes of Corsica (tribes' names are in Italian and not in Latin).

Ancient tribes of Sardinia according to the Greek geographer Ptolemy and Ugas (2005) (tribes' names are in Italian and not in Latin).

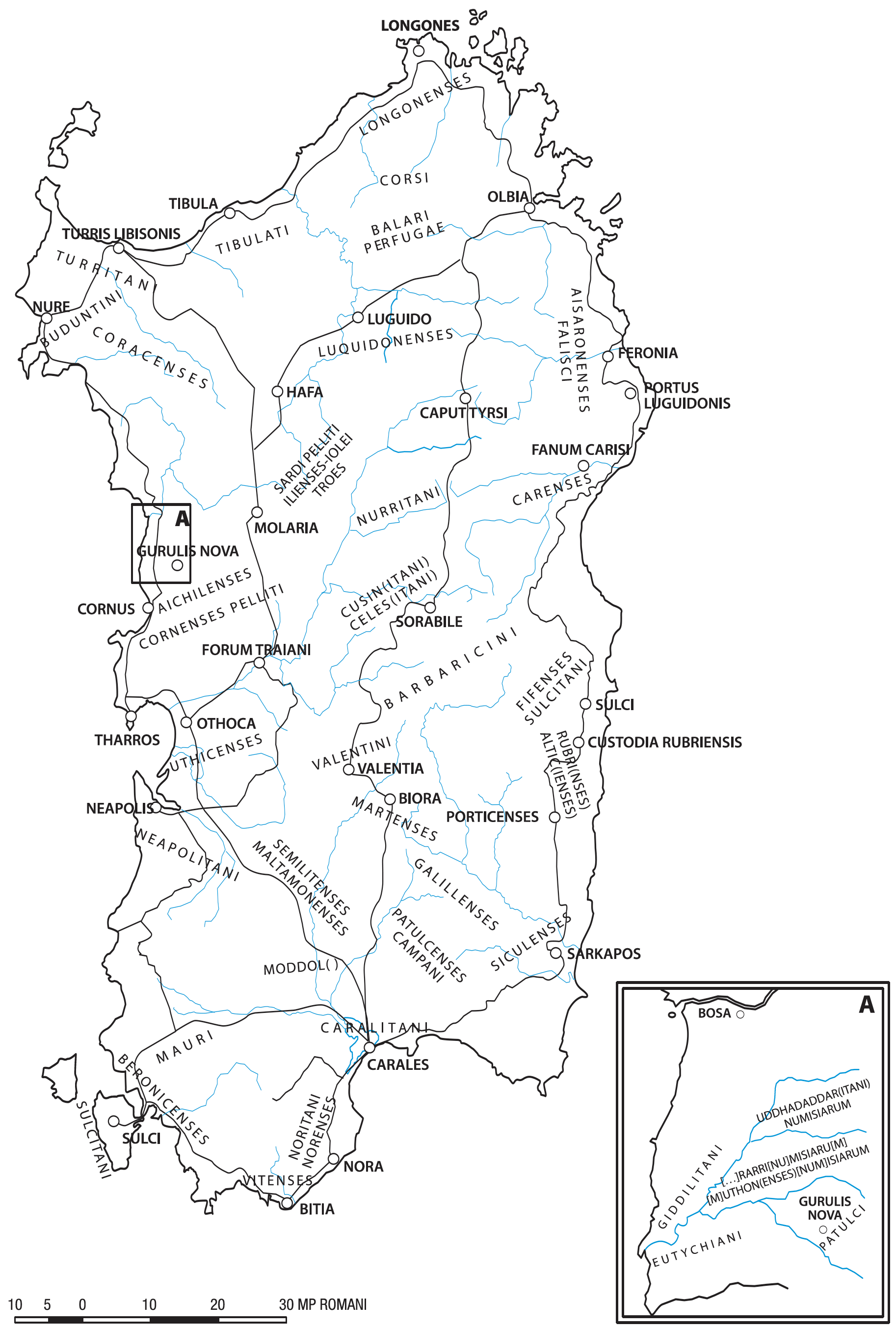
Tribes of Sardinia geographic location described by the Romans.

=== Paleo-Corsicans ===
- Ligures
  - Corsi
    - Belatones (Belatoni)
    - Cervini
    - Cilebenses (Cilibensi)
    - Corsi Proper, they dwelt at the far north-east of Sardinia, near the Tibulati and immediately north of the Coracenses.
    - Cumanenses / Cumasenes (Cumanesi, Cumaseni)
    - Lestricones / Lestrigones (Lestriconi / Lestrigoni) (they lived in far northern Sardinia)
    - Licinini
    - Longonenses (Longonesi) (not to be confused with the Lucuidonenses or Luquidonenses) (they lived in far northern Sardinia)
    - Macrini
    - Opini
    - Subasani
    - Sumbri
    - Tarabeni
    - Tibulati, they dwelt at the far northern Sardinia, about the ancient city of Tibula, near the Corsi (for whom Corsica is named) and immediately north of the Coracenses.
    - Titiani
    - Venacini

=== Paleo-Sardinians ===
- Balares (Balari)
  - Buduntini
  - Coracenses, they dwelt south of the Tibulati and the Corsi (for whom Corsica is named) and north of the Carenses and the Cunusitani
  - Giddilitani
  - Lucuidonenses / Luquidonenses / Lugudonenses / Liguidonenses (Lugudonensi), they dwelt south of the Carenses and the Cunusitani and north of the Æsaronenses (not to be confused with the Longonenses)
  - Nurritani, in Nurra territory (not the same tribe as the Nurrenses or the Norenses / Noritani)
  - Perfugae / Perfugae Balares
  - Turritani
  - Uddadhaddaritani / Uddhadaddhar(itani) Numisiarum (part of the Balares and not of the Ilienses or Iolaes)
- Ilienses / Iolaes / Diagesbes (Iliensi / Iolaei / Iolei)
  - Acconites (Acconiti)
  - Aechilenenses / Aichilenses (Aichilensi) / Cornenses / Cornenses Pelliti
  - Aesaronenses / Aisaronenses (Esanorensi)
  - Alcitani (Alkitani)
  - Alticientes (Altikientes) / Altic(ienses)
  - Barbaricini (Barbarikini) (in the region later known as Barbagia)
  - Barsanes
  - Beronicenses (Beronikenses) (Beronicensi)
  - Bulgares (Ilienses Bulgares)
  - Campani (Patulcenses Campani)
  - Caralitani (Carales, today's Cagliari, was in their territory)
  - Carenses, they dwelt south of the Coracenses and north of the Salcitani and the Lucuidonenses.
  - Celes(itani) / Celsitani, they dwelt south of the Rucensi and north of the Scapitani and the Siculensi.
  - Corpicenses, they dwelt south of the Rucensi and north of the Scapitani and the Siculensi.
  - Cunusitani / Cusin(itani), they dwelt south of the Coracenses and north of the Salcitani and the Lucuidonenses.
  - Euthychiani (Euthicani) (they were not a tribe of the Balares)
  - Fifenses
  - Galillenses (Galillesi)
  - Hypsitani
  - Ilienses (Ilienses Proprii) / Iolei (Iolei Proprii) / Pelliti / Sardi Pelliti
  - Lesitani
  - Maltamonenses
  - Martenses
  - Mauri (Paleo-Sardinian tribe) (Mauri Ilienses), in an area of far southwestern Sardinia (they may have been a tribe related to or of Mauri origin that was assimilated by the Ilienses (Iolei))
  - Moddol(...)
  - Muthon(enses)
  - Neapolitani, they dwelt north of the Sulcitani and the Noritani.
  - Noritani / Norenses, they dwelt at the extreme south part of the island, immediately south of the Neapolitani and the Valentini (not to be confused with the Nurritani or Nurrenses)
  - Nurrenses (Nurensi) (not to be confused with the Norenses or Noritani)
  - Parati
  - Patulcenses (not to be confused with the Patulcii or Patulci)
  - Patulcii / Patulci (not to be confused with the Patulcenses)
  - Rubrenses / Rubri / Rubrinses
  - Rucenses (Rucensi), they dwelt south of the Æchilenenses (also called Cornenses) and north of the Celsitani and the Corpicenses
  - Salcitani (Salkitani), they dwelt south of the Carenses and the Cunusitani and north of the Æsaronenses.
  - Sarrapitani
  - Scapitani, they dwelt south of the Celsitani and the Corpicenses and north of the Neapolitani and the Valentini
  - Semilitenses (Semilitensi) / Maltamonenses (Maltamonensi)
  - Siculenses (Siculesi), they dwelt south of the Celsitani and the Corpicenses and north of the Neapolitani and the Valentini. (may have been a tribe of Siculian or Sicel origin assimilated by the Ilienses or Iolei)
  - Sossinates (Sossinati)
  - Sulcitani / Solcitani, they dwelt at the extreme south part of Sardinia, immediately south of the Neapolitani and the Valentini
  - Uterini
  - Uthicenses / Uthikenses / Othocenses
  - Valentini, they dwelt south of the Scapitani and the Siculensi and north of the Solcitani and the Noritani.
  - Vitenses
  - [...]rarri [Nu]misiaru[m]

== See also ==
- Paleo-Corsican language
- Paleo-Sardinian language
- History of Sardinia
- Nuragic civilization
- Sardinian people
- Torrean civilization
- Corsican people
- Ligures
- Ethnic group
- Tribe
