= Ilienses =

Ancient population of Nuragic Sardinia

The Ilienses or Iolaes or Ilians or Iolai (Ancient Greek: Ἰολαεῖς or Ἰολάειοι or Ἰόλαοι or Ἰλιεῖς); later known as Diagesbes (Διαγησβεῖς) or Diagebres (Διαγηβρεῖς) were an ancient Nuragic people who lived during the Bronze and Iron Ages in central-southern Sardinia, as well as one of the three major groups among which the ancient Sardinians considered themselves divided (along with the Corsi and the Balares). After the Sicilian Wars began with the Punic invasion in the sixth century BC, part of them retreated to the mountainous interior of the island, from which they opposed the foreign rule for centuries.

== History ==
Ancient tribes of Nuragic Sardinia (described by Ptolemy)

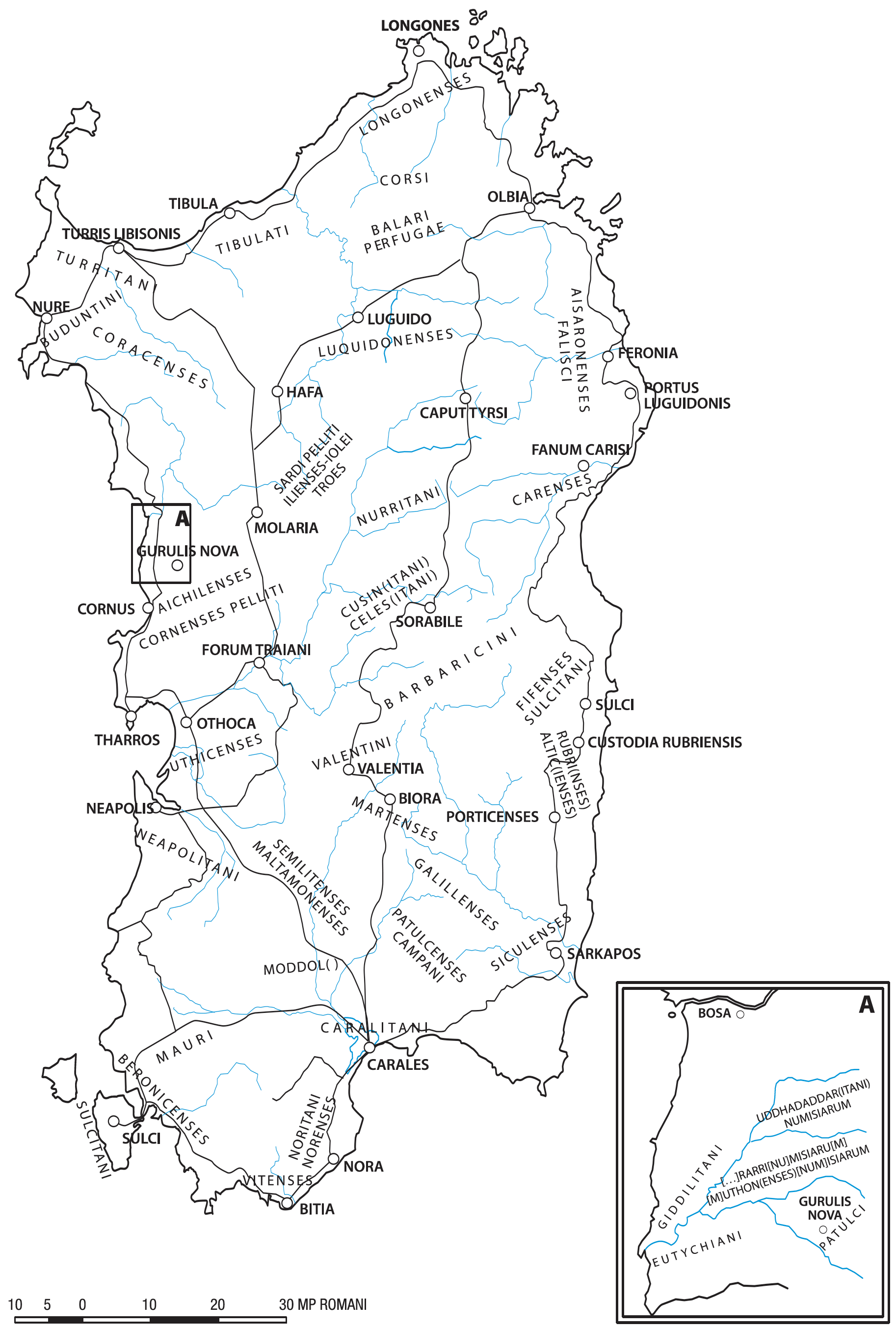
Tribes of Sardinia geographic location described by the Romans.

=== Mythological origins ===
According to the legend recorded by Greek historians, the etymology of their name (Iolaes) is to be traced back to Iolaus, the hero who led the Thespiades, sons of Heracles and the daughters of Thespius (king of the Boeotian city-state of Thespiae) in Sardinia, where he founded a colony. Another myth tell that the old inhabitants of Ilium, better known as Troy, after the fall of the city established themselves in this part of Sardinia (where they mixed with the Iolaes), hence the name of Ilienses. Pomponius Mela considered the Ilienses as the oldest people of the island.

A fourth component part of the population was the army of Iolaus, consisting of Thespians and men from Attica, which put in at Sardinia and founded Olbia [...] Be this as it may, there are still today places in Sardinia called Iolaia, and Iolaus is worshipped by the inhabitants.[...] When Troy was taken, among those Trojans who fled were those who escaped with Aeneas. A part of them, carried from their course by winds, reached Sardinia and intermarried with the Greeks already settled there (Iolaes). But the non-Greek element (Balares ?) were prevented from coming to blows with the Greeks and Trojans, for the two enemies were evenly matched in all warlike equipment, while the river Thorsus (Tirso), flowing between their territories, made both equally afraid to cross it.

— Pausanias, Description of Greece, 10.17

.

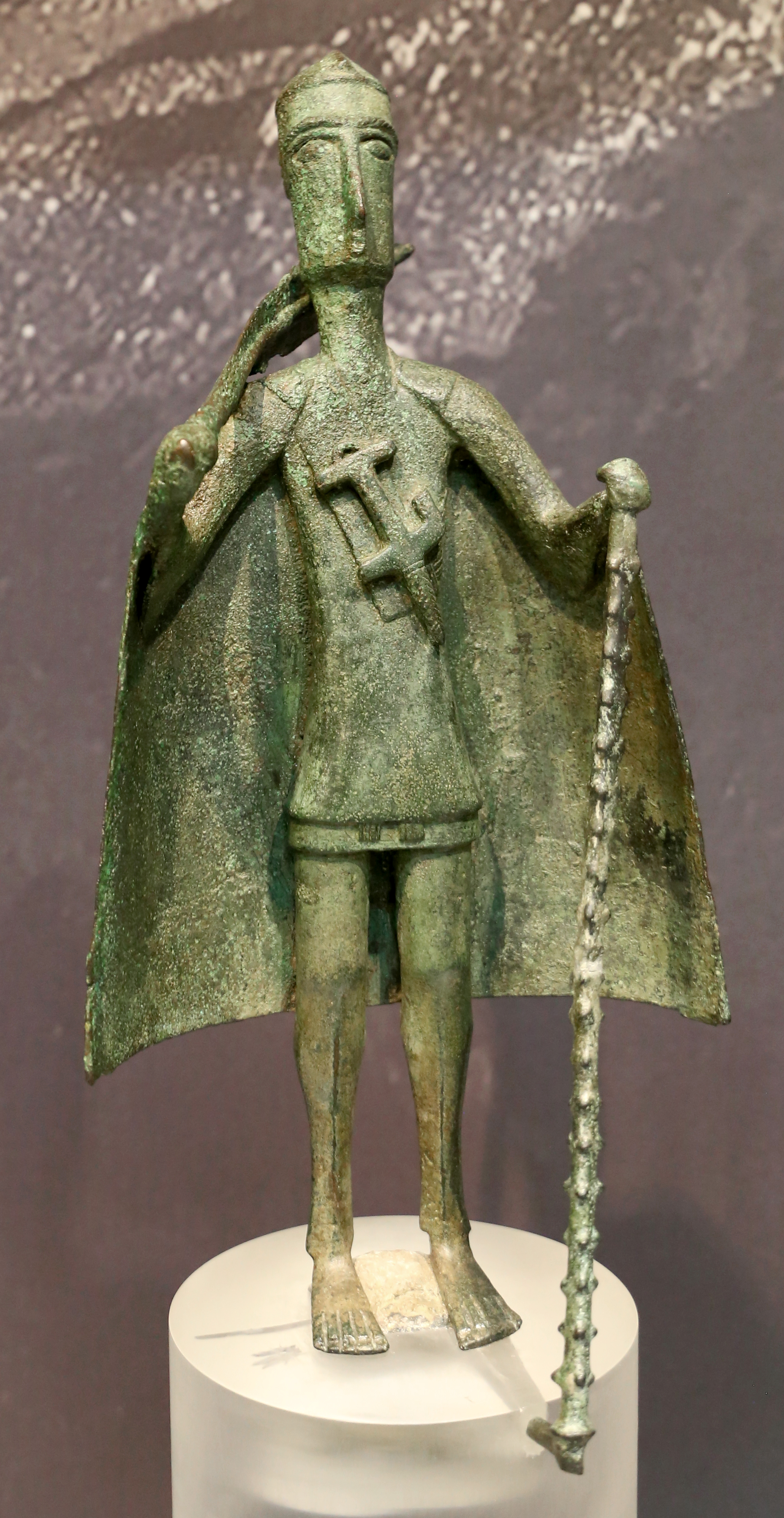
Nuragic bronze statuette from Uta depicting a chieftain, National Archaeological Museum, Cagliari

=== Nuragic period ===
Despite the myth, they were most likely a tribal group indigenous to the island. According to the archaeologist Giovanni Ugas, the Ilienses were the most important population of Nuragic Sardinia and were connected with the Sherden, one of the Sea Peoples widely cited in Ancient Egyptian sources. This hypothesis has been, however, opposed by other archaeologists and historians.

Eduardo Blasco Ferrer correlates their name with the Iberian root *ili-, meaning settlement. In the nuragic period their territory extended from the plain of Campidano (called in antiquity Iolean plain) to the Tirso river in north where began the territory of the Balares. They were probably divided into 40 tribes, each ruled by a king or chieftain. These rulers lived in the complex nuraghi, called "polilobates", such as Su Nuraxi of Barumini.

In what was once their territory, very important are the findings of Mycenaean artifacts, confirming the wealth of exchanges between these two ancient populations. Of particular interest are also the Oxhide ingot, which perhaps came from Cyprus and was discovered in various locations, including the Cagliari area, in the province of Ogliastra and other central areas. Between 1300 and 1200 BC in central-southern Sardinia was produced a kind of gray pottery also called "gray Sardinian"; remains of this type of pottery have been found in Kommos, Crete, and at Cannatello near Agrigento, Sicily.

=== Punic and Roman period ===
As witnessed by the ancient sources (Diodorus Siculus, Bibliotheca historica and Pausanias, Description of Greece) since the sixth century BC this population opposed fiercely to the domination of Carthage.

When the Carthaginians were at the height of their sea power, they overcame all in Sardinia except the Ilians (Ilienses) and Corsicans, who were kept from slavery by the strength of the mountains.

— Pausanias, Description of Greece, 10.17

After the end of the First Punic War in 238 BC the Romans occupied the main strongholds of the Punic Sardinia, but the people of the interior opposed even to the new invaders.

In 227 BC, Corsica and Sardinia became the second Roman province (the first was Sicily). The outbreak of the Second Punic War and the victories of Hannibal in the Italian Peninsula provoked new stirrings of rebellion in Sardinia where, after the Roman defeat at the Battle of Cannae, the Sardinian-Punic landowner and military Hampsicora, helped by the Carthaginians and by Ilienses, organized a new uprising. In 215 BC the rebels were defeated and massacred in the battle of Decimomannu by Titus Manlius Torquatus and so Carthage lost the island definitively.

In Roman times the Ilienses and the Balares of the interior continued to resist, but in 177 BC they were heavily defeated by the consul Tiberius Gracchus who killed or enslaved about 80,000 Sardinians. However still in imperial time they were not completely subjugated by Rome and continued to live relatively independently in the central region called Barbagia.

== Ilienses / Iolaes tribes (Iolei) ==
- Acconites (Acconiti)
- Aechilenenses / Aichilenses (Aichilensi) / Cornenses / Cornenses Pelliti
- Aesaronenses / Aisaronenses (Esanorensi)
- Alcitani (Alkitani)
- Alticientes (Altikientes) / Altic(ienses)
- Barbaricini (Barbarikini) (in the region later known as Barbagia)
- Beronicenses (Beronikenses) (Beronicensi)
- Bulgares (Ilienses Bulgares)
- Campani (Patulcenses Campani)
- Caralitani (Carales, today's Cagliari, was in their territory)
- Carenses, they dwelt south of the Coracenses and north of the Salcitani and the Lucuidonenses.
- Celes(itani) / Celsitani, they dwelt south of the Rucensi and north of the Scapitani and the Siculensi.
- Corpicenses, they dwelt south of the Rucensi and north of the Scapitani and the Siculensi.
- Cunusitani / Cusin(itani), they dwelt south of the Coracenses and north of the Salcitani and the Lucuidonenses.
- Euthychiani (Euthicani) (they were not a tribe of the Balares)
- Fifenses
- Galillenses (Galillesi)
- Hypsitani
- Ilienses (Ilienses Proprii) / Iolei (Iolei Proprii) / Pelliti / Sardi Pelliti
- Lesitani
- Maltamonenses
- Martenses
- Mauri (Paleo-Sardinian tribe) (Mauri Ilienses), in an area of far southwestern Sardinia (they may have been a tribe related to or of Mauri origin that was assimilated by the Ilienses (Iolei))
- Moddol(...)
- Muthon(enses)
- Neapolitani, they dwelt north of the Sulcitani and the Noritani.
- Noritani / Norenses, they dwelt at the extreme south part of the island, immediately south of the Neapolitani and the Valentini (not to be confused with the Nurritani or Nurrenses)
- Nurrenses (Nurensi) (not to be confused with the Norenses or Noritani)
- Parati
- Patulcenses (not to be confused with the Patulcii or Patulci)
- Patulcii / Patulci (not to be confused with the Patulcenses)
- Rubrenses / Rubri / Rubrinses
- Rucenses (Rucensi), they dwelt south of the Æchilenenses (also called Cornenses) and north of the Celsitani and the Corpicenses
- Salcitani (Salkitani), they dwelt south of the Carenses and the Cunusitani and north of the Æsaronenses.
- Sarrapitani
- Scapitani, they dwelt south of the Celsitani and the Corpicenses and north of the Neapolitani and the Valentini
- Semilitenses (Semilitensi) / Maltamonenses (Maltamonensi)
- Siculenses (Siculesi), they dwelt south of the Celsitani and the Corpicenses and north of the Neapolitani and the Valentini. (may have been a tribe of Siculian or Sicel origin assimilated by the Ilienses or Iolei)
- Sossinates (Sossinati)
- Sulcitani / Solcitani, they dwelt at the extreme south part of Sardinia, immediately south of the Neapolitani and the Valentini
- Uterini
- Uthicenses / Uthikenses / Othocenses
- Valentini, they dwelt south of the Scapitani and the Siculensi and north of the Solcitani and the Noritani.
- Vitenses
- [...]rarri [Nu]misiaru[m]

== See also ==
- List of ancient Corsican and Sardinian tribes
- Balares (Balari)
- Corsi
- Paleo-Corsican language
- Paleo-Sardinian language
- History of Sardinia
- Nuragic civilization
- Sardinian people
- Torrean civilization
- Corsican people
- Ethnic group
- Tribe

== Bibliography ==
- Ugas, Giovanni (2005). L'Alba dei Nuraghi. Cagliari: Fabula editrice. ISBN 88-89661-00-3.
