= Balares =

Ancient population of Nuragic Sardinia

The Balares were one of the three major groups among which the Nuragic Sardinians considered themselves divided (along with the Corsi and the Ilienses).

== History ==
Ancient tribes of Nuragic Sardinia.

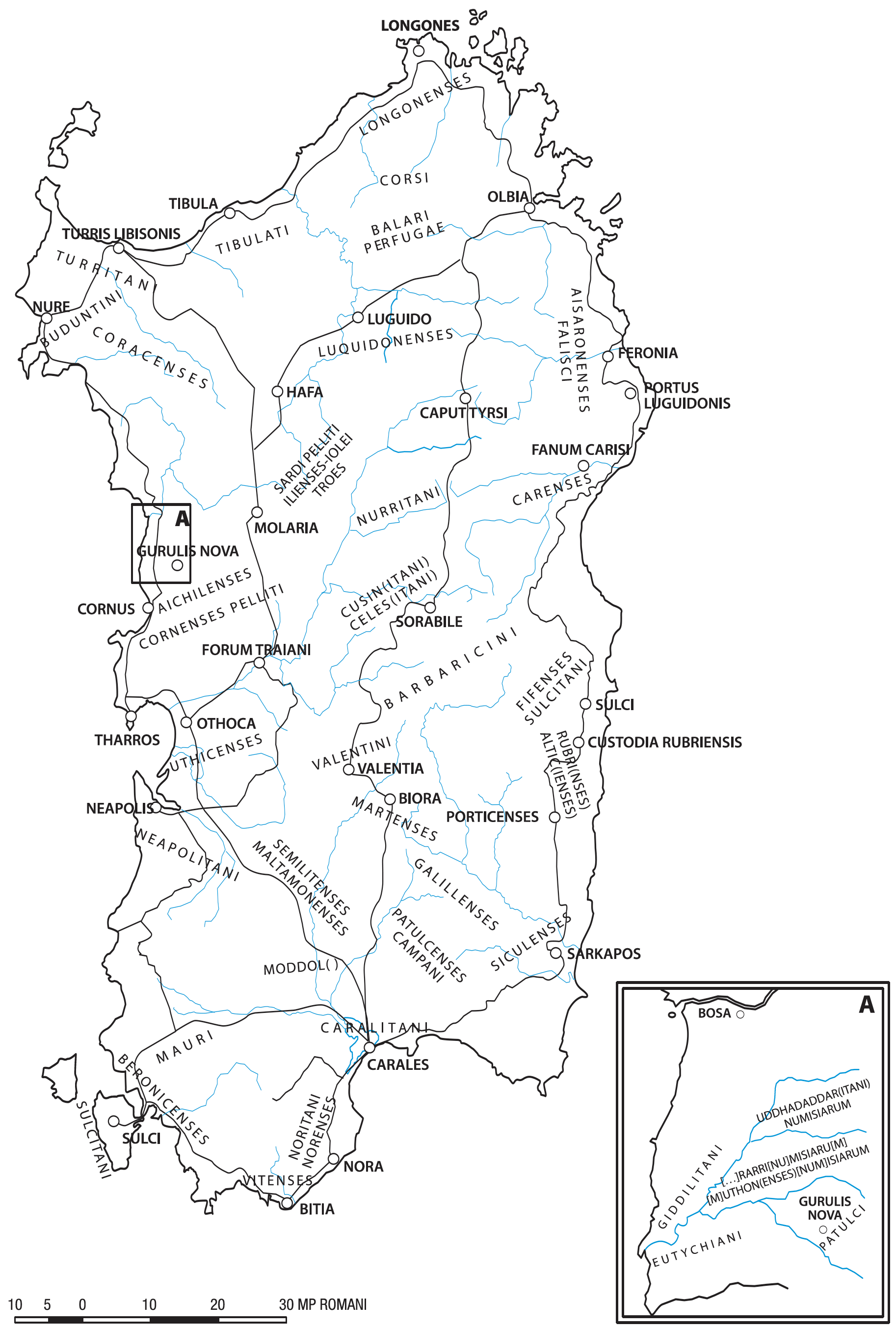
Tribes of Sardinia geographic location described by the Romans.

Pausanias in his work Periegesis speculated that the Balares were the descendants of the Iberian and African mercenaries of Carthage, adding that in the language of the Corsi, "Balares" translates to fugitives.

Some of the Carthaginian mercenaries, either Libyans or Iberians, quarrelled about the booty, mutinied in a passion, and added to the number of the highland settlers. Their name in the Cyrnian (Corsican) language is Balari, which is the Cyrnian word for fugitives.

— Pausanias, Description of Greece, 10.17.9

In the Historiae, Sallust mentions a possible origin from the city of Palla, Corsica.

Archaeologist Giovanni Ugas proposed that they derived from the first wave of the Beaker people who settled in the island in the late Copper Age from the Franco-Iberian area and that they were related with the ancient peoples of the Balearic Islands; their name has been connected with that of Balarus, a chief of the Vettones. According to Ugas, during the Nuragic period the Balares lived in the whole north-western part of the island (Nurra, Anglona, Sassarese); their territory bordered with the Ilienses in the south (Tirso) and with the Corsi in the north-east (Mount Limbara).

After the Punic and Roman occupation of Sardinia, part of the Balares, along with the Ilienses and the Corsi, retreated in the mountainous region called Barbagia to resist the invaders. In 177 BC, the Balares and Ilienses revolted against the Romans but they were defeated by the legions of Tiberius Gracchus.

The Ilienses, reinforced by auxiliaries of the Balari, had attacked the province while it was at peace, and could not be resisted since the army was weak and had lost a large number of its members as a result of a pestilence.

— Livy, The History of Rome, Book 41, chapter 6, § 6

Strabo in the Geographica mention them among the "nations of mountaineers" that raided the Italian coast.

There are four nations of mountaineers, the Parati, Sossinati, Balari, and the Aconites. These people dwell in caverns. Although they have some arable land, they neglect its cultivation, preferring rather to plunder what they find cultivated by others, whether on the island or on the continent, where they make descents, especially upon the Pisatæ.

— Strabo, Geography, Book 5, p. 225

== Balares tribes (Balari) ==
- Coracenses, they dwelt south of the Tibulati and the Corsi (for whom Corsica is named) and north of the Carenses and the Cunusitani
- Giddilitani
- Lucuidonenses / Luquidonenses / Lugudonenses / Liguidonenses (Lugudonensi), they dwelt south of the Carenses and the Cunusitani and north of the Æsaronenses (not to be confused with the Longonenses)
- Nurritani, in Nurra territory (not the same tribe as the Nurrenses or the Norenses / Noritani)
- Perfugae / Perfugae Balares
- Turritani
- Uddadhaddaritani / Uddhadaddhar(itani) Numisiarum (part of the Balares and not of the Ilienses or Iolaes

== See also ==
- List of ancient Corsican and Sardinian tribes
- Ilienses / Iolaes (Iolei)
- Corsi
- Paleo-Corsican language
- Paleo-Sardinian language
- History of Sardinia
- Nuragic civilization
- Sardinian people
- Torrean civilization
- Corsican people
- Ethnic group
- Tribe

== Bibliography ==
- Ugas, Giovanni (2005). L'alba dei nuraghi. Cagliari: Fabula. ISBN 88-89661-00-3.
