= Roman-Sardinian Wars =

Series of wars between the Romans and the indigenous people of Sardinia

Date	238 – 230 BC; 226 – 225 BC; 217 – 216 BC; 181 BC; 178 – 172 BC; 126 – 122 BC; 115 – 111 BC; 106 BC; 6 – 19 AD
Location	Sardinia
Result	Roman victory
Territorial changes	Conquest and occupation of coastal and interior Sardinia

Belligerents
Roman Republic, succeeded by Roman Empire	Principal belligerents: Ilienses Balares Corsi; Other belligerents: Acconites Parates Norenses Cunusitanes Celsitanes Galillenses Siculenses Aechilenenses Euthichenses Uddadhaddaritanes; Allies: Carthage

The Roman-Sardinian Wars (Latin: Bellum Sardum) were a series of conflicts in Sardinia between the 3rd century BC and the 1st century AD. These wars pitted the Roman Republic and later the Roman Empire against the major Sardinian tribes: the Ilienses (later Ioles or Diagesbes), the Balares and the Corsi (located in today's Gallura), in a struggle for control of the coastal cities.

The coasts and the plains, known as Romania ("land of the Romans"), were significantly influenced by the Romans during their centuries of dominion; the internal mountais too, even if later in time and more difficultly for the Romans. The Roman presence was eventually eroded by the arrival of the Vandals; however, these new invaders were unable to take control of the interior and consequently settled in the coastal cities for at least 80 years. The Byzantines then arrived in Sardinia, struggling with the peoples of Barbaria for a period, before finally signing a peace treaty with Hospiton, chief of the Ilienses.

== See also ==
- Sardinia and Corsica
