= Paleo-Sardinian language =

Extinct language isolate indigenous to the island of Sardinia

Paleo-Sardinian
- Nuragic
- Region: Sardinia
- Ethnicity: Ancient Sardinians
- Extinct: c. 2nd century AD
- Language family: Unclassified

Language codes
- ISO 639-3: None (mis)
- Glottolog: None

Paleo-Sardinian, also known as Proto-Sardinian or Nuragic, is a set of extinct languages spoken on the Mediterranean island of Sardinia by the ancient Sardinian population during the Nuragic era. Starting from the Roman conquest of Sardinia and Corsica, a process of language shift took place, wherein Latin became the only language spoken by the islanders. Paleo-Sardinian is thought to have left traces in the island's onomastics as well as toponyms, which appear to preserve grammatical suffixes, and a number of words in the modern Sardinian language.

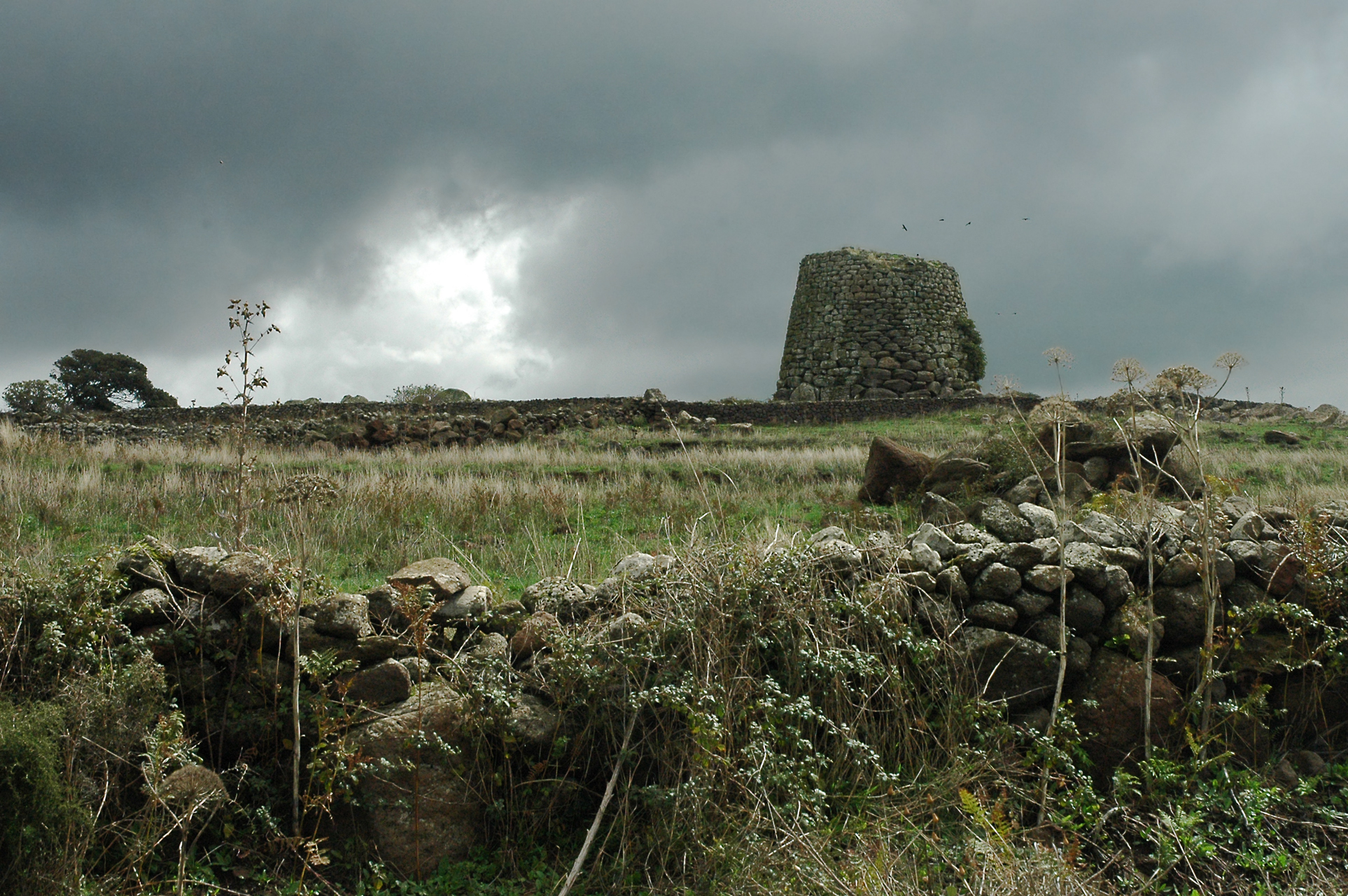
Monotower Nuraghe

== Pre-Indo-European hypothesis ==
There is toponymic evidence suggesting that the Paleo-Sardinian language may have a connection to the reconstructed Proto-Basque and to the Pre-Indo-European Iberian language of Spain. According to Max Leopold Wagner:

So e.g. sakkáyu, -a, sakkáġġu, -a is in Sardinian a lamb or a goat of a year or a year and a half; brings to mind the Aragonese segało, Catalan sagall, Béarnese sigàlo 'goat of the same age', which my colleague Rohlfs combined with the Basque segaila 'a year old goat' which seems to be derived from the Basque sekail, segail 'svelte', sakaildu 'décharner, maigrir'. Of course, not everything is equally certain, and the investigation must be continued and expanded. Naturally I am far from wanting to identify Sardinians and Basques, Sardinians and Iberians, I believe that one must always bear in mind that other influences may also have manifested themselves, long-standing Mediterranean influences, Ligurian and perhaps even Alpine influences. Certain coincidences between Sardinian and Albanian are also notable.

Massimo Pallottino, referring to various authors such as Bertoldi, Terracini and Wagner, highlighted the following similarities between Sardinian, Basque and Iberian:

Various Sardinian onomastic elements recall Iberian place names, not only in the roots (which often have a pan-Mediterranean diffusion) but also in the morphological structure of the words, for example: Sardinian: ula-, olla-; Iberian: Ulla; Sardinian: paluca, Iberian: baluca; Sardinian: nora, nurra, Iberian: nurra; Iberian: iturri-pe.

Added to this is a fact that, due to the number of concordances, cannot be considered casual and appears to be of the highest interest: the existence, that is, of specific analogies between elements of the lexical heritage of the Basque language and individual lexical relics or toponymic entries in Sardinia:

Examples: Sardinian: aurri (black hornbeam); Basque: aurri (name of tree) Sardinian: bitti (little lamb); Basque: bitin (little goat); Sardinian: golosti (holly); Basque: gorosti (holly) Sardinian: sgiàgaru (dog); Basque: zakur (dog); Sardinian: mògoro (height); Basque: mokor (clod, trunk); Sardinian: òspile (small enclosure); Basque: ospel (shady place) Sardinian: orri, orrui; Basque: orri (juniper) Sardinian: usai, useis; Basque: usi (forest);

The correspondences also extend to formative elements: for example -aga, which in Basque is used for toponyms with a collective meaning (harriaga-pile of stones from harri-stone) and which can explain the Sardinian type nuraghe compared to nurra (also the Iberian toponym Tarracone to the Sardinian maragoni).

— La Sardegna nuragica, Massimo Pallottino, Ilisso edizioni, 1950, p. 96.

Archaeologist Giovanni Lilliu hypothesized that the "Basque-Caucasian" idioms of the Bonnanaro culture replaced the previous languages of "pan-Mediterranean" type spoken by the preceding cultures.

Eduardo Blasco Ferrer concluded that the Paleo-Sardinian language developed on the island in the Neolithic as a result of prehistoric migration from the Iberian Peninsula. In his analysis of the Paleo-Sardinian language, he finds only traces of Indo-European influence ‍–‍ *ōsa, *debel- and perhaps *mara, *pal-, *nava, *sala ‍–‍ which were possibly introduced in the Late Chalcolithic through Liguria. Similarities between Paleo-Sardinian and Ancient Ligurian were also noted by Emidio De Felice. Blasco Ferrer stated:

The results thus obtained have shed light on the true nature of the Paleo-Sardinian substratum, that is, of an agglutinative language, which shows clear structural correspondences with the Paleo-Hispanic languages, in particular with the reconstructed Paleo-Basque and with Iberian. [...] The investigation highlights for the first time the stratified components of the pre-Semitic (Phoenician-Punic) Paleo-Sardinian substratum, that is, a primary Paleo-Basque and Iberian component, plus two minor components, one Peri-Indo-European and one Paleo-Indo-European

However, for the linguist and glottologist Giulio Paulis, the Basque language is not helpful in the interpretation of the toponymic heritage of Paleo-Sardinian origin.

Bertoldi and Terracini propose that the common suffix -ara, stressed on the antepenult, was a plural marker, and they indicated a connection to Iberian or to the Paleo-Sicilian languages. Terracini claims a similar connection for the suffixes -ànarV, -ànnarV, -énnarV,and -ònnarV, as in the place name Bonnànnaro. The suffix-ini also seems to be characteristic, as in the place name Barùmini. Infixes -arr-, -err-, -orr-, and -urr- have been claimed to correspond to the North African Numidia (Terracini), to the Basque-speaking Iberia and Gascony (Wagner, Rohlfs, Blasco Ferrer, Hubschmid), and to southern Italy (Rohlfs).

The non-Latin suffixes -ài, -éi, -òi, and -ùi survive in modern place names based on Latin roots. Terracini sees connections to Berber. Bertoldi sees an Anatolian connection in the endings -ài, -asài (similar claims have been made of the Elymians of Sicily). A suffix -aiko is also common in Iberia. The tribal suffix -itani, -etani, as in the Sulcitani, has also been identified as Paleo-Sardinian.

Several linguists, including Bertoldi, Terracini, Wagner, and Hubschmid, proposed various linguistic layers in prehistoric Sardinia. The oldest – pan-Mediterranean – was widespread in the Iberian Peninsula, France, Italy, Sardinia, and North Africa. The second – Hispano-Caucasian – would explain the similarities between Basque and Paleo-Sardinian, and the third – Ligurian.

== Indo-European hypotheses ==
=== Ancient Balkan hypothesis ===
The scholar Alberto Areddu developed the idea that Sardinia was civilized by Aegaean/Pelasgian people around 1800 BCE, on the basis of various lexical elements unanimously recognized as belonging to the substratum. He argued that one must speak in particular for the most conservative areas of the island, Ogliastra and Barbagia, of a particular branch of Indo-European, which shows strong formal and semantic correspondences with the few testimonies of Illyrian (or Thracian) and above all with their current linguistic continuation, Albanian; the concordances are then extended to various toponyms and microtoponyms of the central area. He provides the following comparisons with Albanian:

- Sardinian: alase 'holly, butcher's broom, weed' (in Sardinian: laruspinosu 'thorny laurel') = Albanian halë 'bone; remains (of cereals); coniferous needle; black pine', halëz 'arista or remains of the ear; splinter' ;
- Sardinian amadrina 'hind' = alb. drenje, drenushe 'doe';
- Sardinian càstia 'net to collect straw' = alb. kashtë 'straw';
- Sardinian curma,cruma ‘Ruta graveolens’ in Sardinian called too: erba de sos bermes ‘worm grass’ = alb. krym ‘worm’
- Sardinian dréddula 'ivy' = alb. dredhëz 'ivy';
- Sardinian élimu 'grudge' = alb. helm 'poison, sorrow';
- Sardinian eni, enis, eniu 'yew tree' = Albanian enjë 'yew’;
- Sardinian iscarpuddu, scarpuddu ‘Morel mushroom’ = alb. kërpudhë ‘mushroom’
- Sardinian matricusia 'broom' = alb. modriqi 'broom';
- Sardinian rethi 'tendril' = alb. rrypthi 'tendril';
- Sardinian sarcone 'enclosure for animals' = alb. thark 'fence';
- Sardinian theppa 'tip, stony top', top. Zèppara = alb. thep 'stony tip';
- Sardinian thùrgalu 'torrent' = alb. çurg 'brook, brook, stream of water';
- Sardinian ùrtzula'clematis', top. Urtzulei = alb. (h)urth, hurdh 'ivy'.

=== Etruscan-Nuragic connection ===
The linguist Massimo Pittau argues that the Paleo-Sardinian language and the Etruscan language were closely linked, as he argues that they were both emanations of the Anatolian branch of Indo-European. According to Pittau, the "Nuragics" were of Lydian origin who imported their Indo-European language to the island, pushing out the Pre-Indo-European languages spoken by the Pre-Nuragic peoples, but this hypothesis does not enjoy consensus. The Etruscan language is believed to be neither Indo-European nor related to the Anatolian languages nor to the Paleo-Sardinian language. The consensus among scholars is that Etruscan is only related to the Rhaetic language spoken in the Alps and to the language attested by a few inscriptions found on the island of Lemnos.

Some examples of Nuragic names of Indo-European origin might be:

- calambusa «sprig of cherry tree with fruits» (Osini), probably Sardian or Nuragic relict [suff. Aegean-Anatolian -ús (s) a], perhaps to compare – not derive – with the Greek kaláme «cane, stem» (Indoeur.).
- népide, nébide, nébida, nébidi "fog" (Barbagia and southern Sardinia); Sardian or Nuragic relict, to be compared – not derived – with the Greek néphos «fog» (Indoeur.) (LISPR).
- saurra «humidity of the night, frost, dew» (Log.), toponyms Saurrecci (Guspini), Zaurrái (Isili), Aurracci (Ussassai), Urracci (Guspini) (suffixes and accent); Sardian or Nuragic relict, probably to compare – not derive – with a metathesis, with Lat. ros, roris, Lithuanian rasà, ant. Slavic rose, Vedic rasá «dew» and with the Sanskrit rásah «humidity» (DELL) and therefore Indo-European. (corrige DILS, LISPR).

Some scholars attribute a "Rhaetian-Etruscoid" strand with the suffix -èna that characterizes a series of toponyms in central Italy (Tuscany, Umbria, Tuscia and Marsica) and in Veneto, passing through Emilia and Romagna. The presence of this suffix is attested, at least since the Middle Ages, also in southern Corsica and in the eastern coast of Sardinia (Gallura, Barbagia, Ogliastra), e.g., Arzachèna, Lugulèna, etc.

== Other hypotheses ==
Nuragic populations, ancient tribes of Sardinia, speakers of Paleo-Sardinian language or languages are shown in yellow and red.

Archeologist Giovanni Ugas suggested that the three main Nuragic populations (Balares, Corsi and Ilienses) may have had separate origins and spoke different languages:

- the Balares from the Iberian Peninsula or Southern France and thus of either non-Indo-European (Proto-Iberian) or Indo-European origin, linked to the Beaker culture.
- The Corsi people from the northeast may be of Ligurian origin.
- The Iolaei/Ilienses, who inhabited the southern plains and present-day Barbagia, likely would have spoken a pre-Indo-European language, possibly similar to Minoan and other languages of that area.

The common subdivision of modern Sardinian into the three dialects of Gallurese, Logudorese, and Campidanese might reflect that multilingual substratum. Other Paleo-Sardinian tribes of possible Indo-European stock were the Lucuidonenses from the north of the island (Note: May originally be from Provence, France, where the toponym Lugdunum is attested.), and the Siculensi from the Sarrabus region. (Note: Perhaps related to the Siculi from Sicily)

== See also ==
- Paleo-Corsican language
- Pre-Nuragic Sardinia
- Nuragic civilization
- List of ancient Corsican and Sardinian tribes
- History of Sardinia
- Prehistory of Corsica
