= Torrean civilization =

Bronze Age civilization

Location of torri in Corsica

The Torrean civilization was a Bronze Age megalithic civilization that developed in Southern Corsica, mostly concentrated south of Ajaccio, during the second half of the second millennium BC.

== History ==
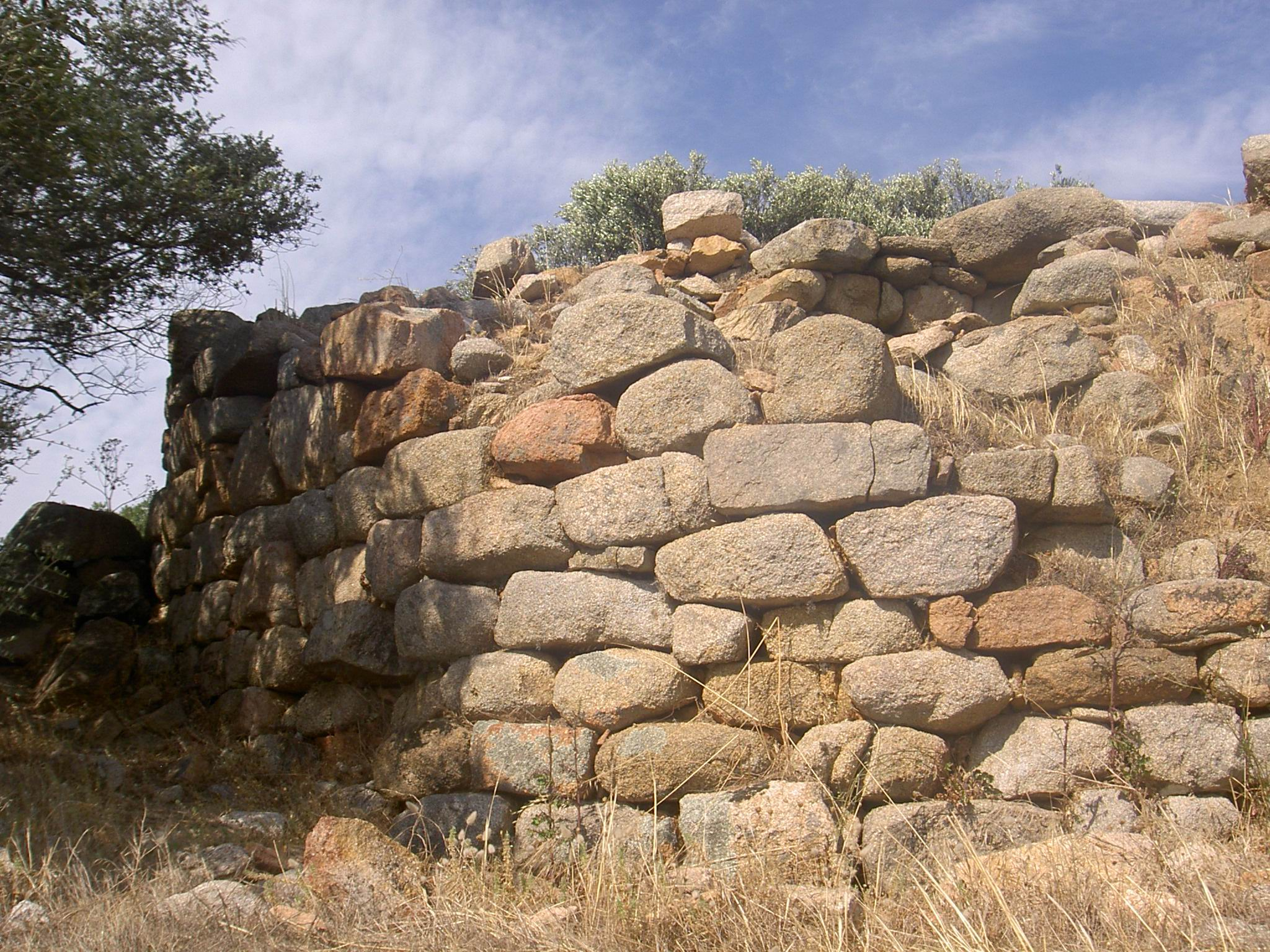
Torre from Ceccia

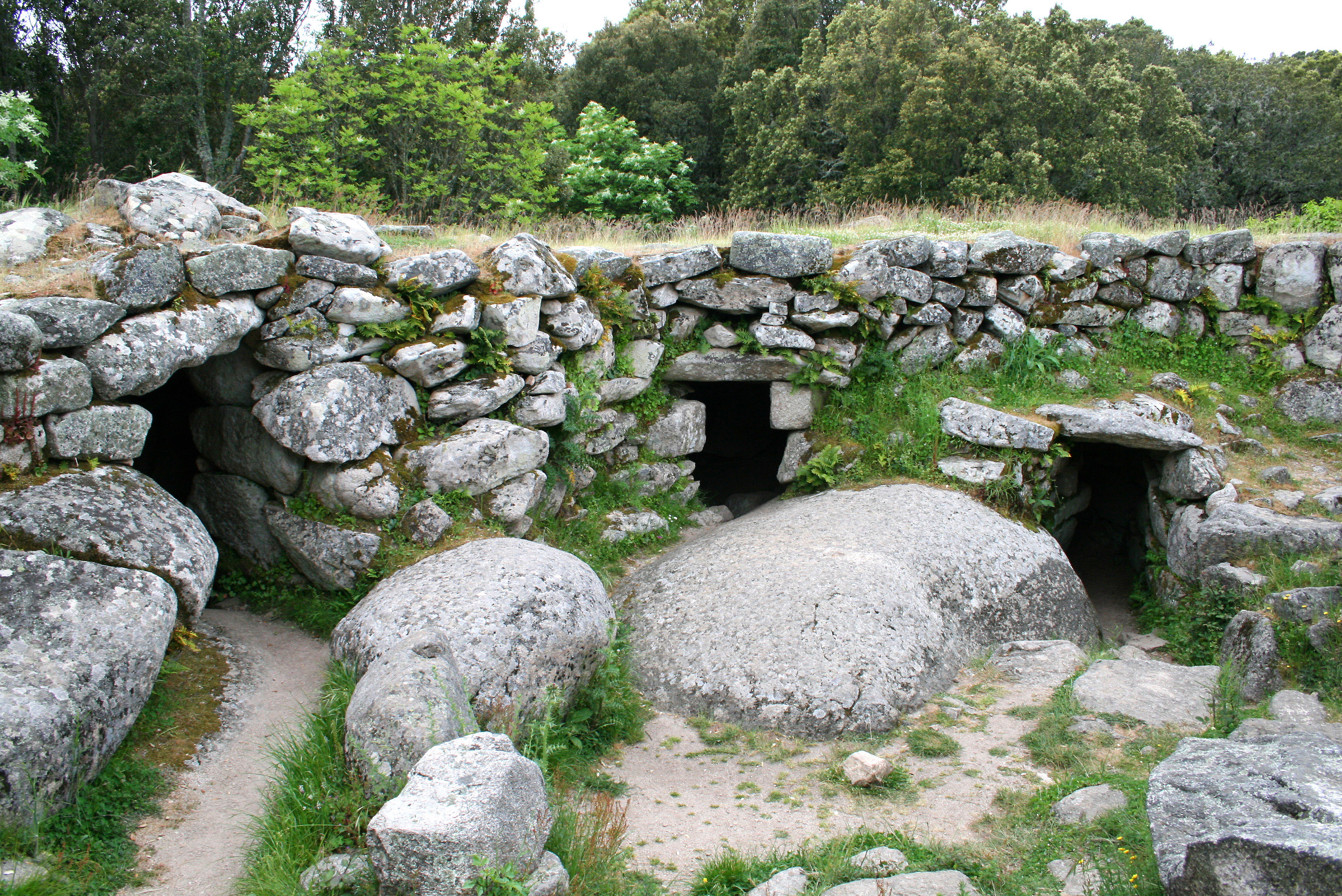
"Castle" of Cucuruzzu

The characteristic buildings of this culture are the torri ("towers"), megalithic structures similar to the Sardinian nuraghes, from which the culture takes its name, and the castelli ("castles"), more complex buildings that include a wall, a tower and huts.

According to preliminary investigations conducted during the 1950s by the French scholar Roger Grosjean, the Torrean civilization began when, at the end of the second millennium BC, the Sea People known as Sherden landed on the island from the Eastern Mediterranean, subduing the native megalithic population. The Sherden brought metallurgy to the island and built the torri, which Grosjean thought were temples dedicated to the worship of fire and the dead. They also erected statue menhir representing their leaders armed with swords and a horned helmet, similar to the Sherden immortalized in the temple of Medinet Habu in Egypt.

Currently, the Torrean civilization is seen as an indigenous civilization, and the result of a local evolution started since the Neolithic with possible Sardinian (Bonnanaro culture), North Italian (Polada culture) and later Central Italian (Apennine culture) influences. In fact, according to modern dating, the first towers and castles were built a millennium earlier than Grosjean thought, at the end of the third millennium BC, at the same time or even before the appearance of the first protonuraghes in Sardinia. Also, contrary to what Grosjean thought, metallurgy had existed in Corsica for centuries before the supposed "arrival of the Sherden near Porto Vecchio." The Terrina site, near Aleria, shows that the processing of copper had spread on the island from the early centuries of the third millennium B.C.

However, some scholars think that Sherden may have migrated to Corsica from the west (Sardinia) instead of the east, and that they themselves pushed toward the Eastern Mediterranean for piracy, possibly in the pay of the Mycenaean lords.

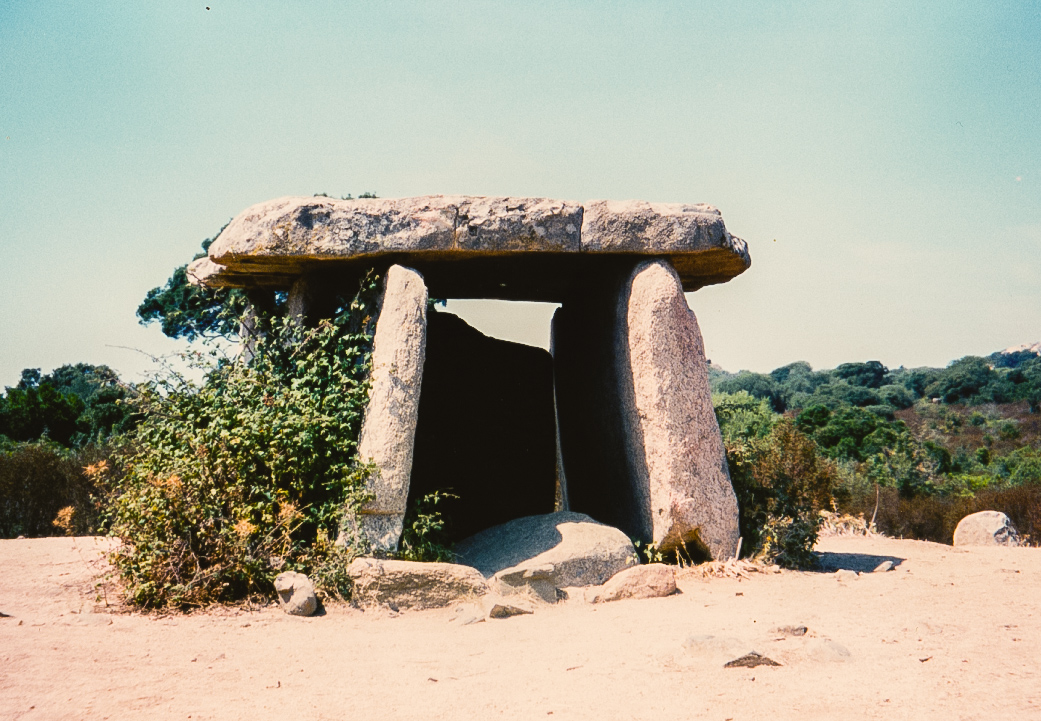
Dolmen of Funtanaccia, Sartene

During the Iron Age, the towers and castles were still occupied, but the relationships with Sardinia become less intense (the characteristic Nuragic bronze statuettes are absent in Corsica), while in the north there were increasing contacts with Tuscany and Liguria.

The Torrean civilization disappeared in the middle of the first millennium BC, when Corsica was settled by the Ligurians, the Greeks of Phocaea, the Etruscans, the Carthaginians, and then the Romans.

The Torrean people might be associated with the Corsi, a people that lived in Corsica and north-east Sardinia during Roman times, described as one of the main tribal groups of the two islands together with the Sardinian Ilienses and the Balares. The Corsi were in turn divided into several other tribes that dwelt in Corsica: the Belatoni, Cervini, Cilibensi, Cumanesi, Licinini, Macrini, Opini, Subasani, Sumbri, Tarabeni, Titiani, and Venacini. Potential Corsi tribes in Nuragic Sardinia included the proper Corsi, from whom Corsica derives its name, and who dwelt at the extreme north-east of Sardinia; Longonensi; and the Tibulati, who dwelt at the extreme north of Sardinia, around the ancient city of Tibula.

== Politics ==
The Torrean society was not organized into a complex political system with a strong central power; the villages of huts at the foot of the castles rather indicate that it was structured into small chiefdoms that dominated the valleys.

== Society ==
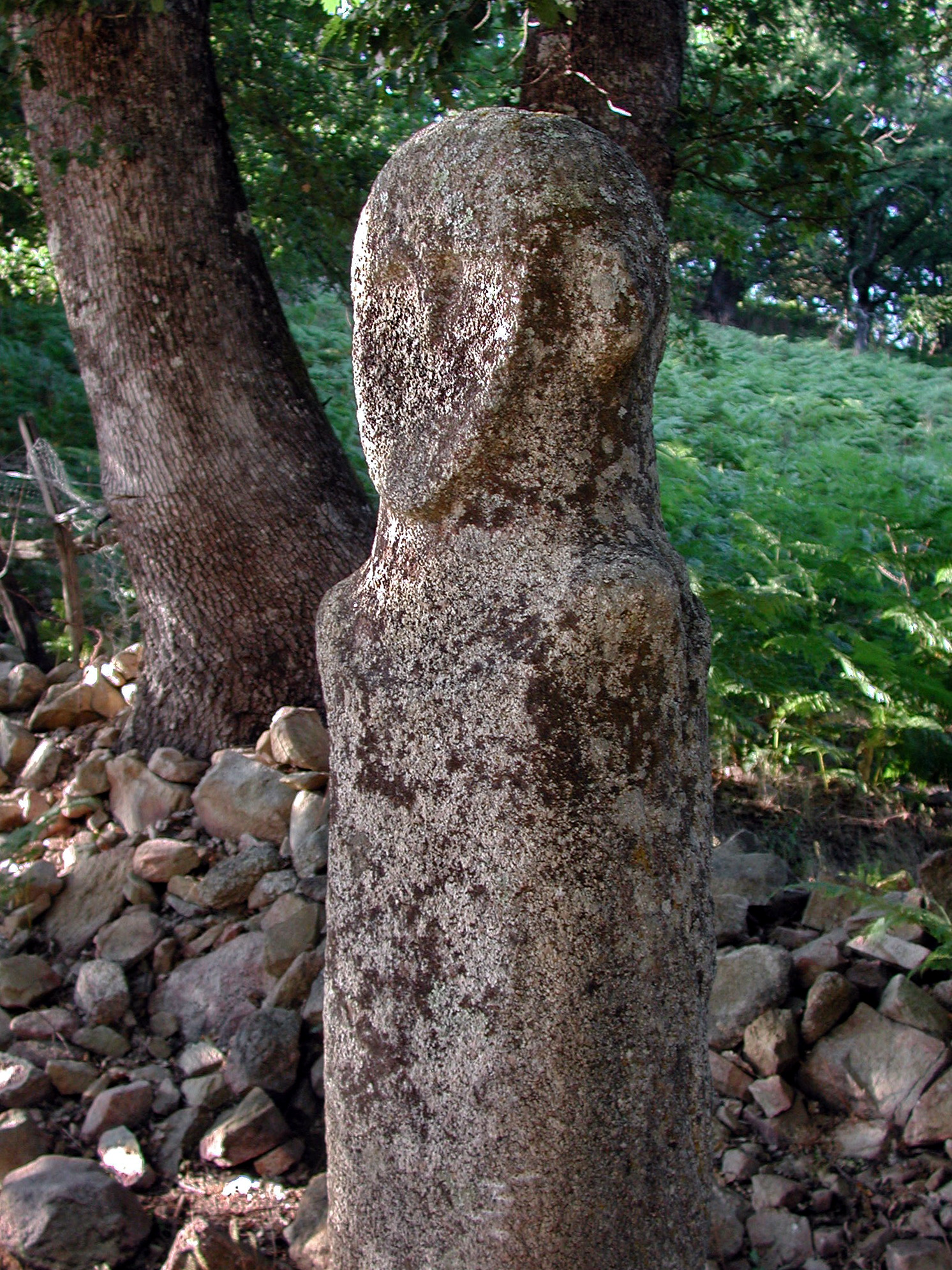
Statue menhir from Tavera

The representations in anthropomorphic statues reflect a hierarchical society led by a warrior class that flaunted its military virtues. Some interpretations also reveal the existence of lower classes such as traders and craftsmen.

== Religion ==
Torrean buildings with specifically religious functions are unknown, making it difficult to identify a possible priestly caste; religiosity was expressed, as in the past, in the maintenance of places like coffres (circular tombs with stone cists) and the dolmens.

== Economy ==
The economy was based mainly on agriculture and livestock, particularly of cattle, goats and pigs. In Bronze Age Corsica there was a notable expansion in metallurgy and trade with the East, as evidenced by the discovery at Borgo of a copper oxhide ingot and some cobalt beads, goods coming from Cyprus and the Aegean, respectively. However, there have been only sporadic discoveries of Mycenaean goods, which are quite common in Sardinia.

== Gallery ==
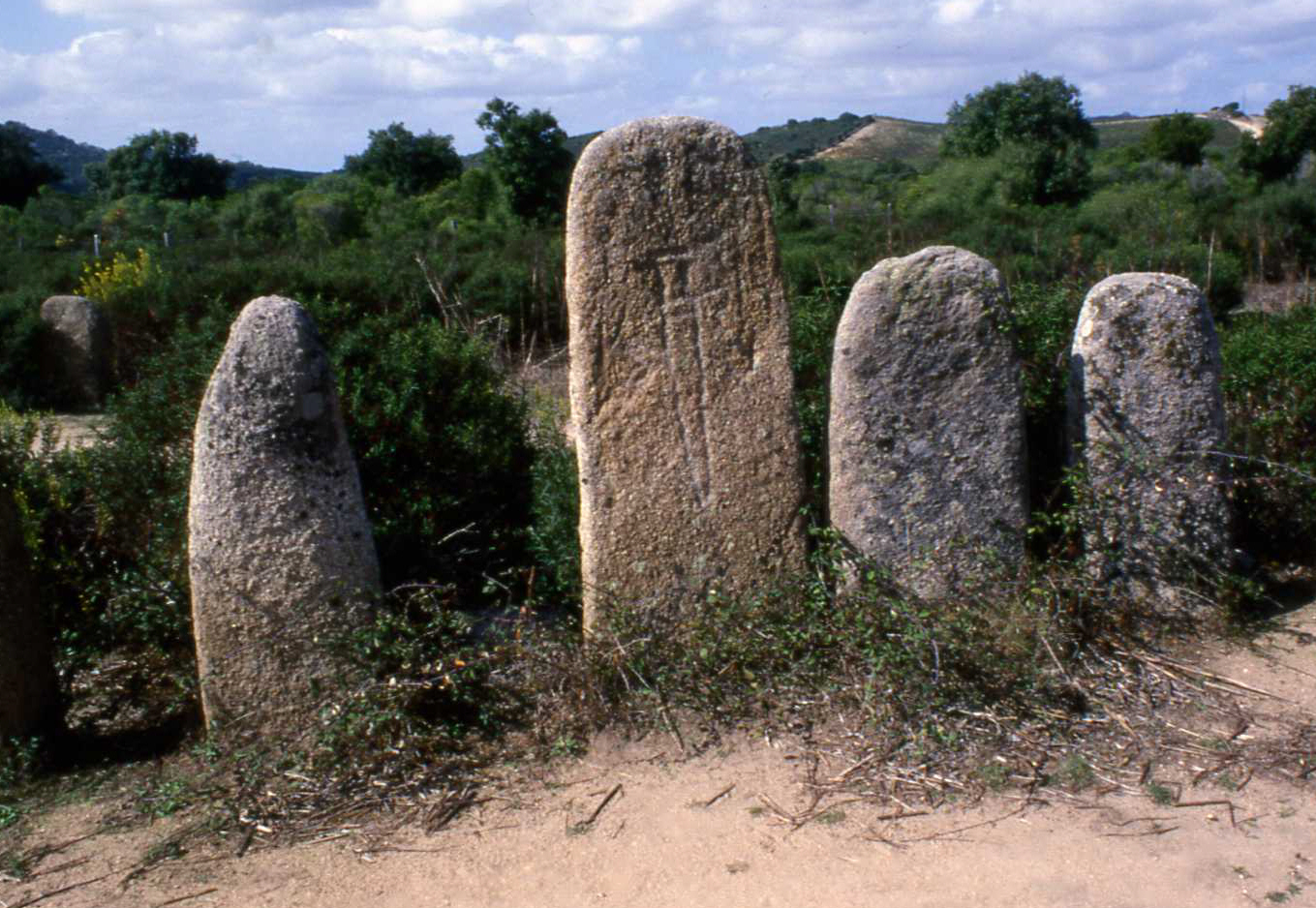
Statue menhir from Palaggiu

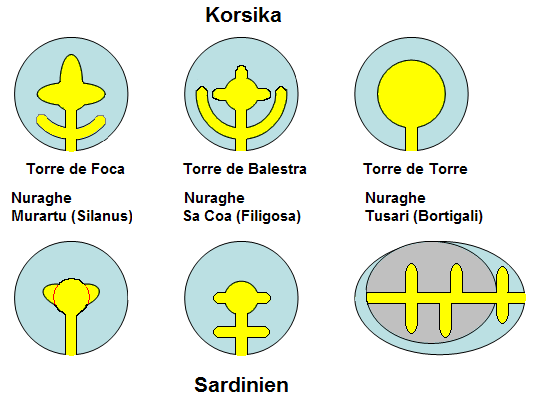
Plans of torri and nuraghi

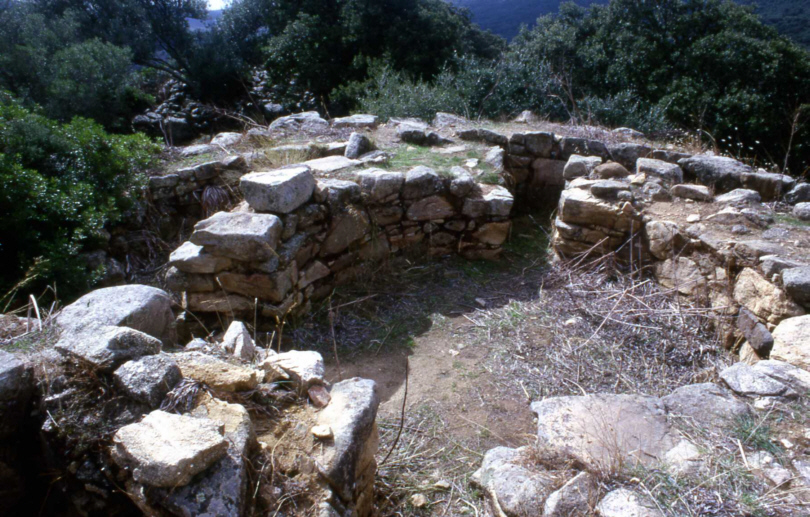
Alo-Bisucce

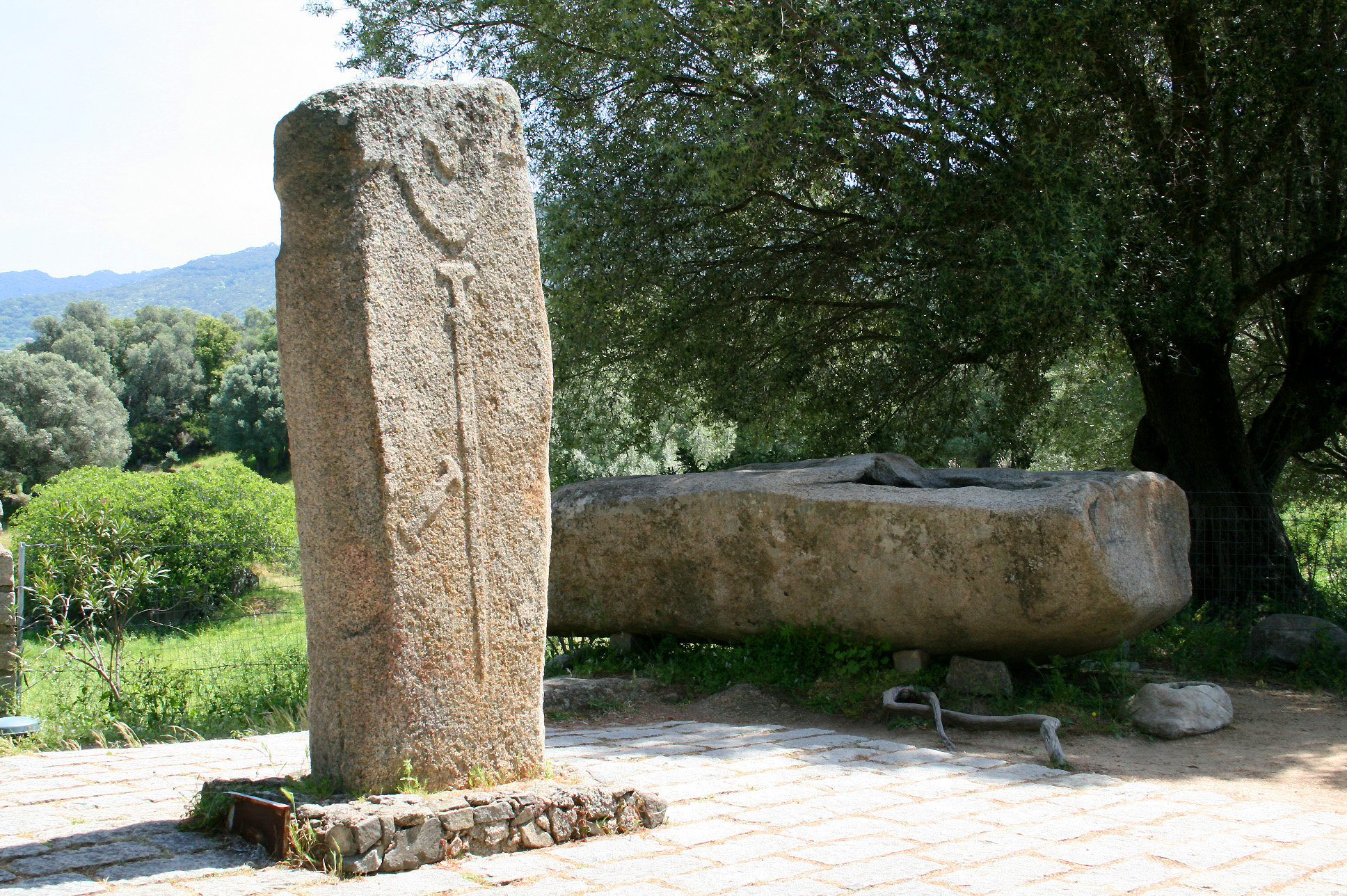
Statue menhir from Filitosa

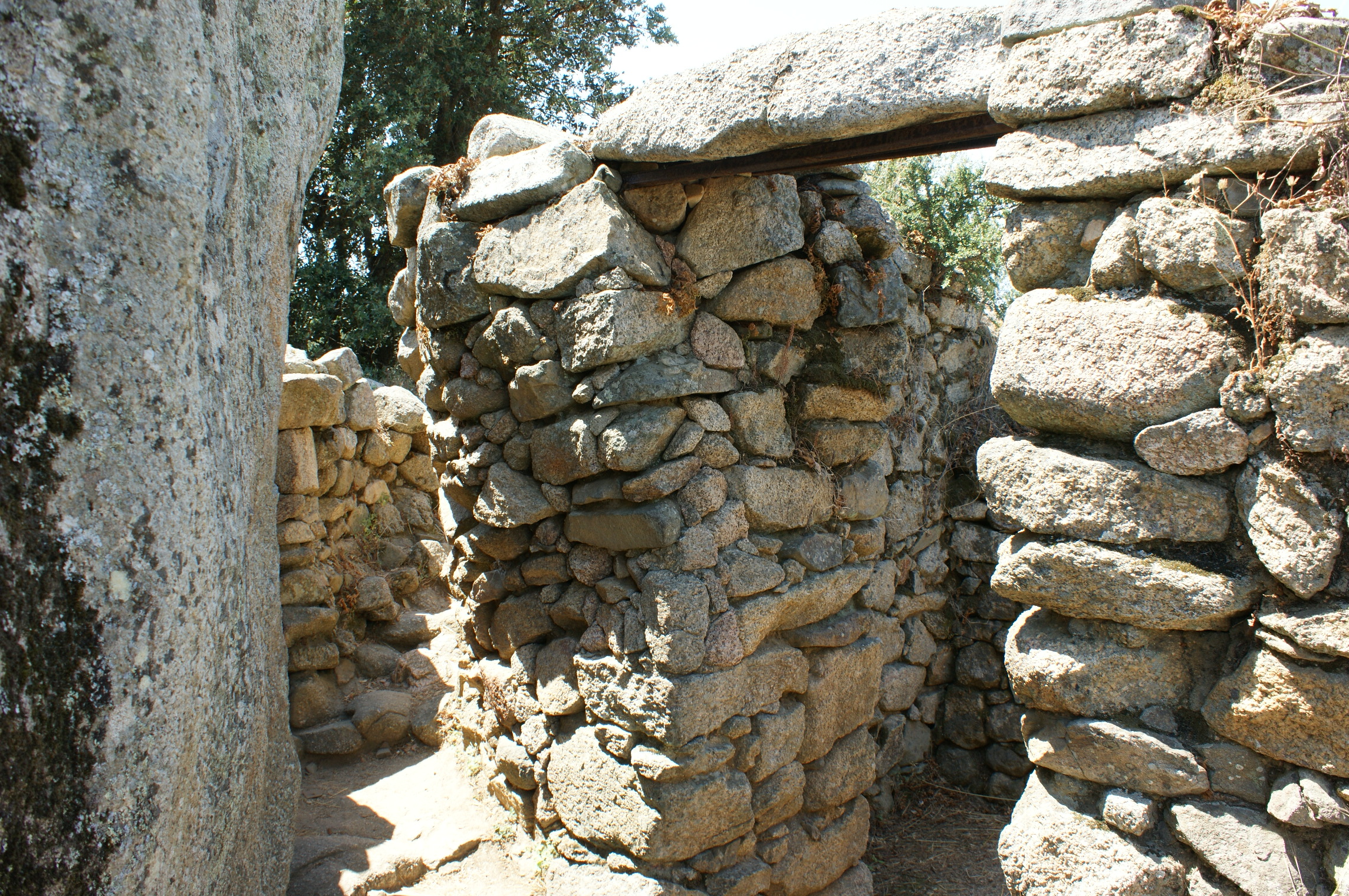
Filitosa

== See also ==
- Nuragic civilization
- Talaiot
- Paleo-Corsican language
- Corsican people

== Bibliography ==
- Camps, Gabriel (1988). Préhistoire d'une île: les origines de la Corse. Paris: Éditions Errance. ISBN 9782903442743.
- Costa, Laurent-Jacques (2004). Corse préhistorique: peuplement d'une île et modes de vie des sociétés insulaires (IXe-IIe millénaires av. J.-C.). Paris: Éditions Errance. ISBN 9782877722735.
- Ugas, Giovanni (2005). L'alba dei nuraghi. Italy: Fabula. ISBN 978-88-89661-00-0.
- Zucca, Raimondo (1996). La Corsica romana. Italy: S'Alvure. ISBN 9788873831266.
