= Sherden =

2nd millennium BC Mediterranean ethnic group

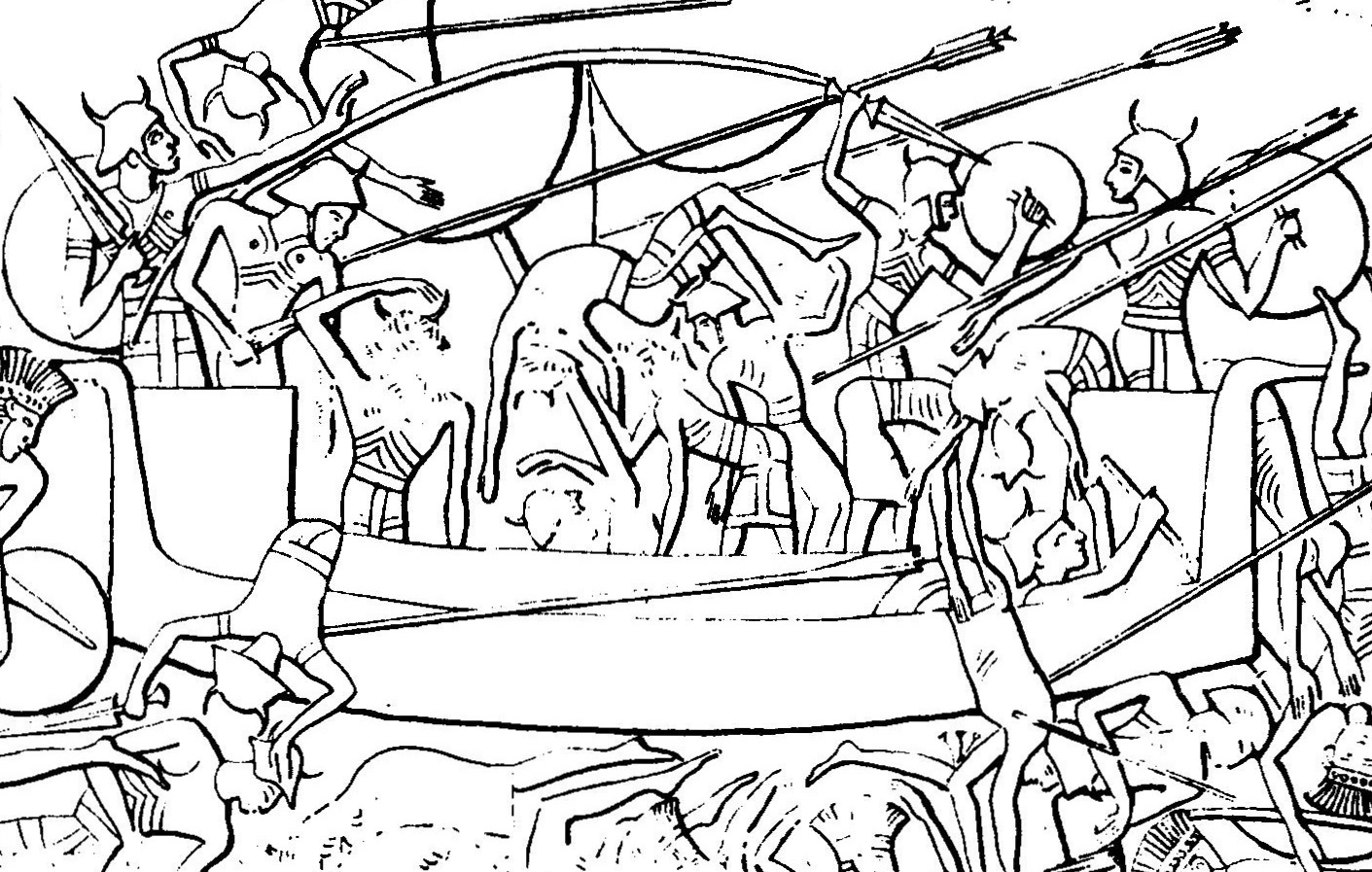
The Sherden in battle as depicted at Medinet Habu

The Sherden (Egyptian: šrdn, šꜣrdꜣnꜣ or šꜣrdynꜣ; Ugaritic: šrdnn(m) and trtn(m); possibly Akkadian: šêrtânnu; also glossed "Shardana" or "Sherdanu") is one of the several ethnic groups the Sea Peoples were said to be composed of, appearing in fragmentary historical and iconographic records (ancient Egyptian and Ugaritic) from the Eastern Mediterranean in the late 2nd millennium BC.

On reliefs, they are shown carrying round shields and spears, dirks or swords, perhaps of Naue II type. In some cases, they are shown wearing corslets and kilts, but their key distinguishing feature is a horned helmet, which, in all cases but three, features a circular accouterment at the crest. At Medinet Habu the corslet appears similar to that worn by the Philistines. The Sherden sword, it has been suggested by archaeologists since James Henry Breasted, may have developed from an enlargement of European daggers and been associated with the exploitation of Bohemian tin. Robert Drews suggested that use of this weapon by groups of Sherden and Philistine mercenaries made them capable of withstanding attacks by chariotry and so made them valuable allies in warfare, but Drews's theory has been widely criticised by contemporary scholars.

== Early historical references ==
=== Amarna period ===
The earliest known mention of the people called Srdn-w, more usually called Sherden or Shardana, is generally thought to be the Akkadian reference to the "še-er-ta-an-nu" in the Amarna Letters correspondence from Rib-Hadda, mayor (hazannu) of Byblos, to the Pharaoh (Amenhotep III, Akhenaten or Tutankhamen, c. 1350 BC). Though they have been referred to as sea raiders and mercenaries, who were prepared to offer their services to local employers, these texts do not provide any evidence of that association, and they shed no light on what the function of these "širdannu-people" was at the time.

=== Ramesses II ===
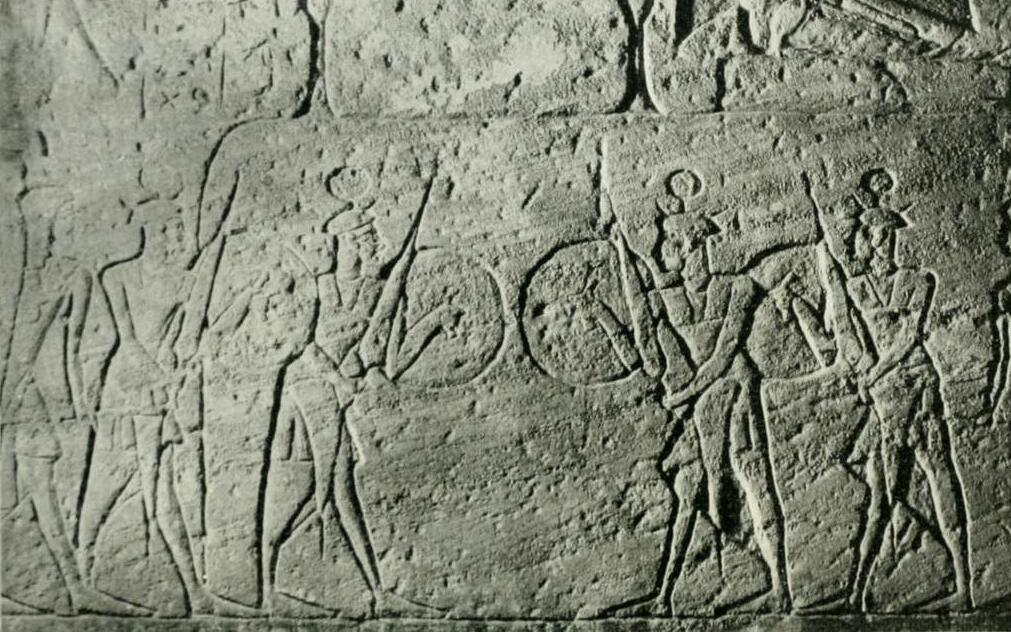
Members of Ramesses II's Sherden personal guard in a relief in Abu Simbel

The first certain mention of the Sherden is found in the records of Ramesses II (ruled 1279–1213 BC), who defeated them in his second year (1278 BC) when they attempted to raid Egypt's coast. The pharaoh subsequently incorporated many of these warriors into his personal guard. An inscription by Ramesses II on a stele from Tanis that recorded the Sherden pirates' raid and subsequent defeat, speaks of the constant threat which they posed to Egypt's Mediterranean coasts:

the unruly Sherden whom no one had ever known how to combat, they came boldly sailing in their warships from the midst of the sea, none being able to withstand them.

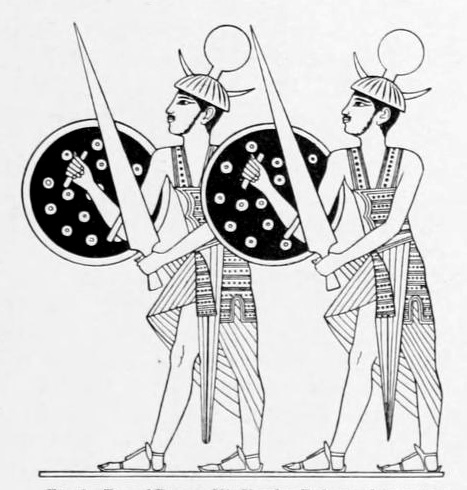
A rendering of two guards from the relief above, in a 19th-century drawing; their equipment is clearly visible.

After Ramesses II succeeded in defeating the invaders and capturing some of them, Sherden captives are depicted in this Pharaoh's bodyguard, where they are conspicuous by their helmets with horns with a ball projecting from the middle, their round shields and the great Naue II swords. In Year 5 of Ramesses II they are depicted in inscriptions about the Battle of Kadesh, fought against the Hittites. Ramesses stated in his Kadesh inscriptions that he incorporated some of the Sherden into his own personal guard at the Battle of Kadesh.

=== Merneptah ===
In Year 5 of Merneptah, the Sherden were among the coalition of Sea Peoples attacking Egypt.

=== Ramesses III ===
After being defeated by Pharaoh Ramesses III, they, along with other "Sea Peoples", would be allowed to settle in that territory, subject to Egyptian rule.

An Egyptian work written around 1100 BC, the Onomasticon of Amenope, documents the presence of the Sherden in Canaan.

The Italian orientalist Giovanni Garbini identified the territory colonized by the Sherden as that occupied, according to the Bible, by the Israelite tribe of Zebulun going by the eponym of Sared, which had established themselves in the northern territory of Canaan. Archaeologist Adam Zertal suggests that some Sherden settled in what is now northern Israel. He hypothesizes that biblical Sisera was a Sherden general and that the archaeological site at el-Ahwat (whose architecture resembles nuraghe sites in Sardinia) was Sisera's capital, Harosheth Haggoyim, though this theory has not received wide acceptance in the scholarly community.

== Connection to Sea Peoples ==
The Sherden seem to have been one of the more prominent groups of pirates that engaged in coastal raiding and the disruption of trade in the years around the 13th century BC. They are first mentioned by name in the Tanis II rhetorical stele of Ramesses II, which says in part, "As for the Sherden of rebellious mind, whom none could ever fight against, who came bold-hearted, they sailed in, in warships from the midst of the Sea, those whom none could withstand; but he plundered them by the victories of his valiant arm, they being carried off to Egypt." It is possible that some of the Sherden captured in the battle recounted in Tanis II were pressed into Egyptian service, perhaps even as shipwrights or advisers on maritime technology, a role in which they may have assisted in the construction of the hybrid Egyptian warships seen on the monumental relief at Medinet Habu that shows the naval battle between Egyptians and Sea Peoples.

Michael Wood has suggested that their raids contributed greatly to the collapse of the Mycenaean civilization. However, while some Aegean attributes can be seen in the material culture of the Philistines, one of the Sea Peoples who established cities on the southern coastal plain of Canaan at the beginning of the Iron Age, the association of the Sherden with this geographic area is based entirely on their association with that group and the Sea Peoples phenomenon writ large, rather than on physical or literary evidence (of which almost all testifies to their presence in Egypt, rather than their port of origin).

== Origins ==
=== Eastern origin theory ===
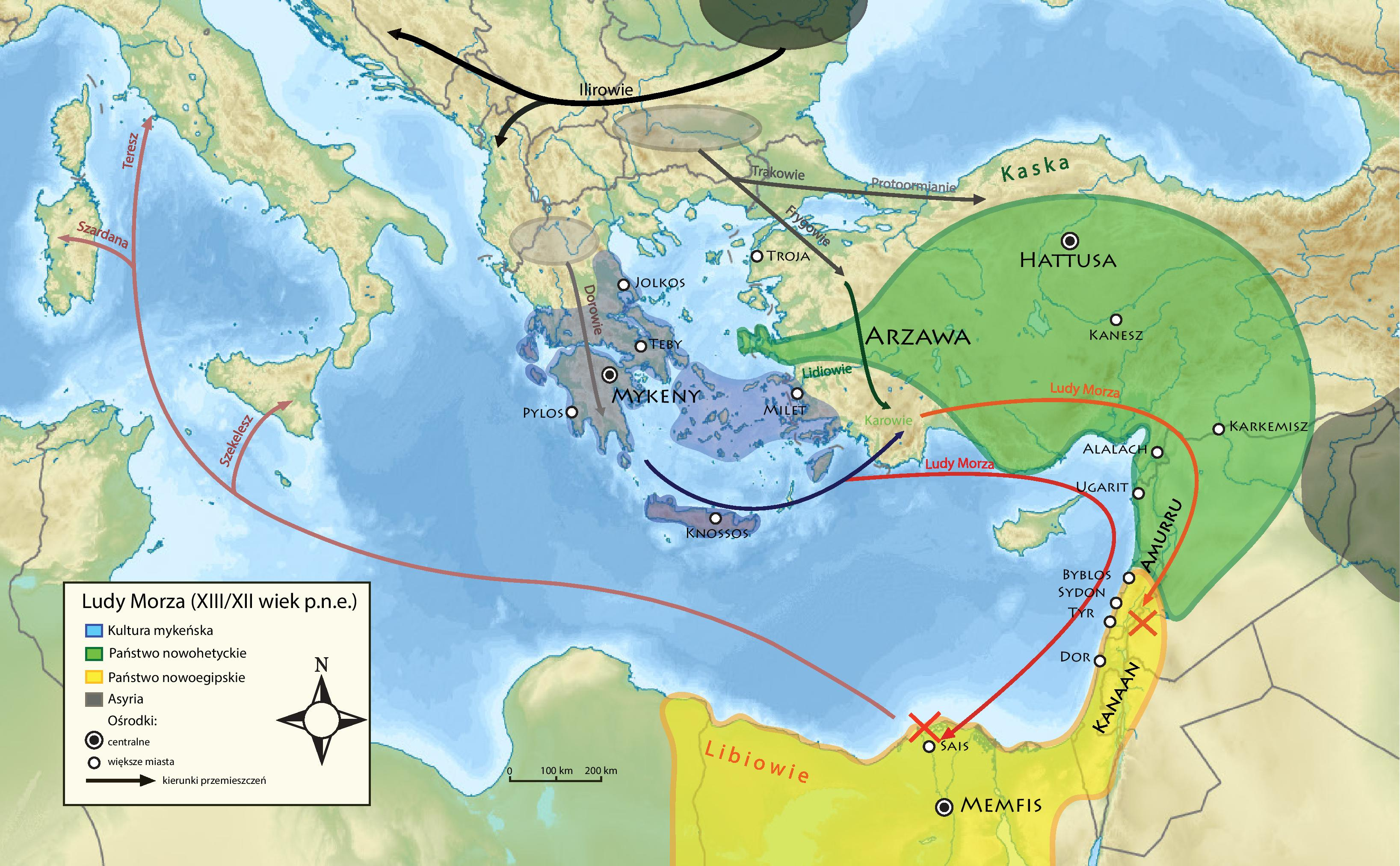
Theorized Sea Peoples migrations from the East

English archaeologist Margaret Guido (1912–1994) concludes the evidence for the Sherden, Shekelesh, or Teresh coming from the western Mediterranean is flimsy. Guido in 1963 suggests that the Sherden may ultimately derive from Ionia, in the central west coast of Anatolia, in the region of Hermos, east of the island of Chios. It is suggested that Sardis, and the Sardinian plain nearby, may preserve a cultural memory of their name.

Until recently it was assumed that Sardis was only settled in the period after the Anatolian and Aegean Dark Age, but American excavations have shown the place was settled in the Bronze Age and was a site of a significant population. If this is so, the Sherden, pushed by Hittite expansionism of the Late Bronze Age and prompted by the famine that affected this region at the same time, may have been pushed to the Aegean Islands, where shortage of space led them to seek adventure and expansion overseas. It is suggested that from here they may have later migrated to Sardinia. Guido suggests that

[if a] few dominating leaders arrived as heroes only a few centuries before Phoenician trading posts were established, several features of Sardinian prehistory might be explained as innovations introduced by them: Oriental types of armour, and fighting perpetuated in the bronze representation of warriors several centuries later; the arrival of the Cypriot copper ingots of the Serra Ilixi type; the sudden advance in and inventiveness of design of the Sardinian nuraghes themselves at about the turn of the first millennium; the introduction of certain religious practices such as the worship of water in sacred wells – if this fact was not introduced [later] by the Phoenician settlers.

It has been stated that the only weapons and armour similar to those of the Sherden found in Sardinia have been dated to several centuries after the period of the Sea Peoples, which mainly covered the 13th–12th centuries BC. If the theory that the Sherden moved to Sardinia only after their defeat around 1178–1175 BC by Ramesses III is true, then it could be inferred from this that the finds in Sardinia are survivals of earlier types of weapons and armour. On the other hand, if the Sherden only moved into the Western Mediterranean in the ninth century, associated perhaps with the movement of early Etruscans and even Phoenician seafaring peoples into the Western Mediterranean at that time, this would solve the problem of the late appearance of their military gear in Sardinia; but it would remain unknown where they were located between the period of the Sea Peoples and their eventual appearance in Sardinia.

=== Western origin theory ===
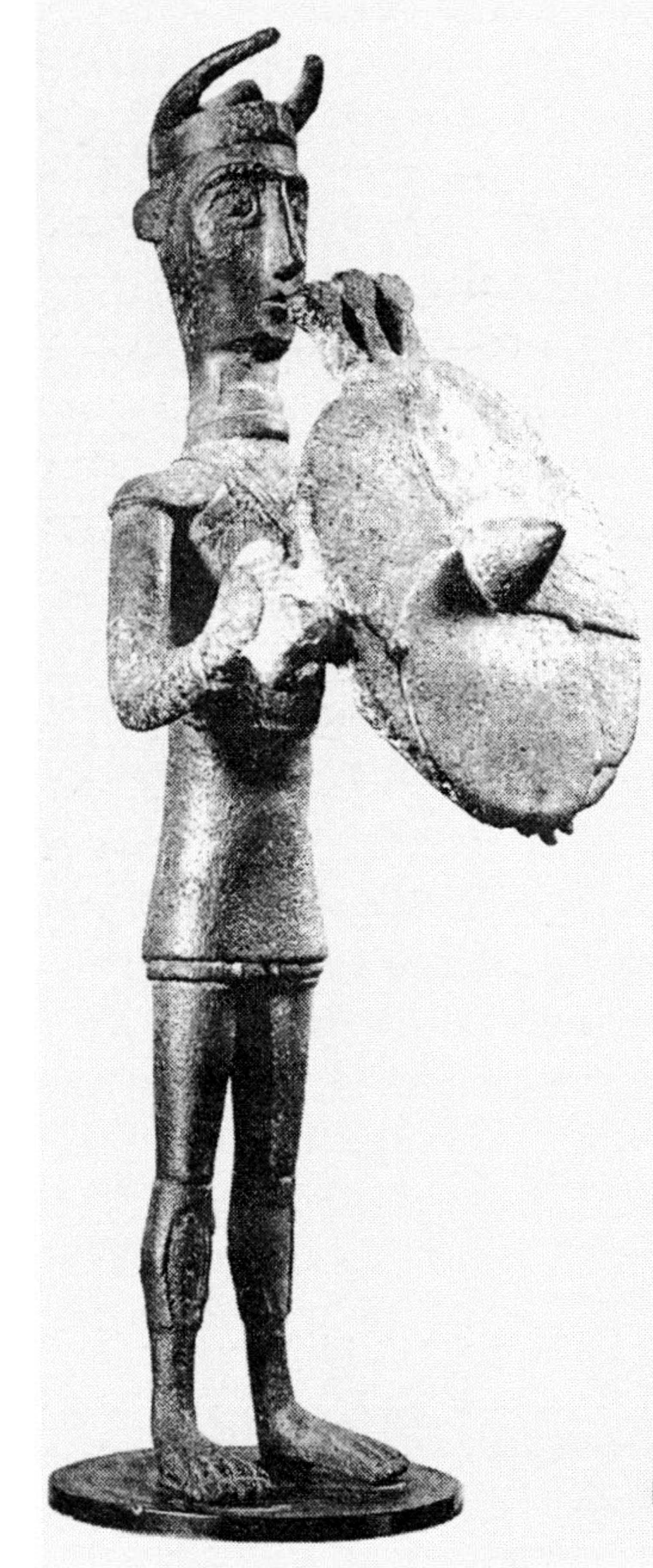
Sardinian bronze statuette of a Nuragic warrior

The theory that postulates a migration of peoples from the Eastern Mediterranean to Sardinia during the Late Bronze Age was firmly rejected by Italian archaeologists like Antonio Taramelli and Massimo Pallottino and by Vere Gordon Childe, and more recently by Giovanni Ugas, who instead identifies the Sherden with the indigenous Sardinian Nuragic civilization. He excavated the accidentally-discovered Hypogeum of Sant'Iroxi in Sardinia, where several arsenical bronze swords and daggers dating back to 1600 BC were found. The discovery suggested that the Nuragic tribes actually used these kind of weapons since the mid-2nd millennium BC, as is also demonstrated by the Nuragic bronze sculptures dating back to as far as 1200 BC and depicting warriors with a horned helmet and a round shield.

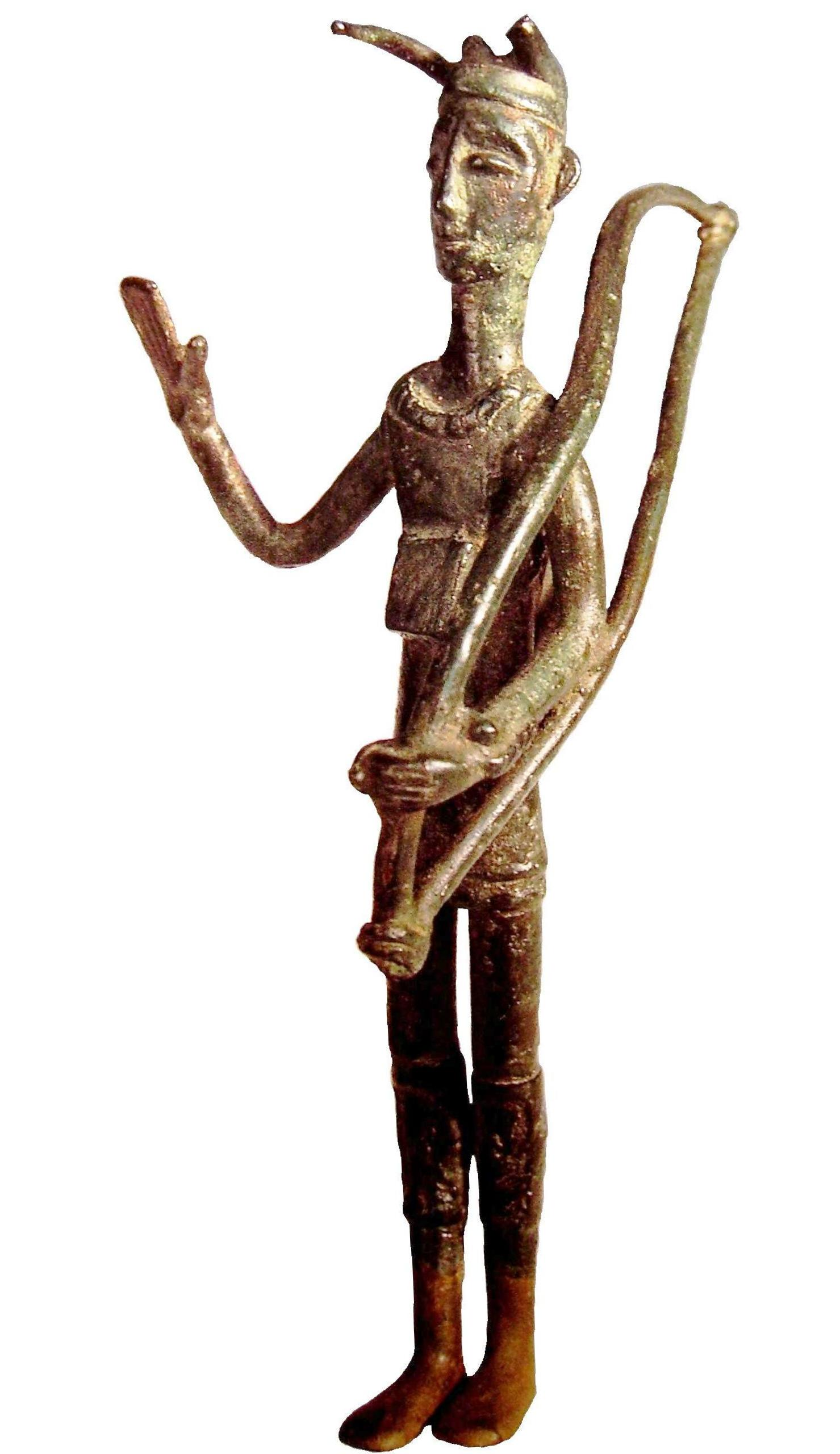
Sardinian bronze statuette of a Nuragic archer

Similar swords are also depicted on the statue menhir of Filitosa, in southern Corsica. Giovanni Lilliu noted that the period in which the Sherden are mentioned in the Egyptian sources coincides with the height of the Nuragic civilization. According to Robert Drews, Sardinians from the Gulf of Cagliari and the nearby areas were encouraged to become warriors and leave their island in order to improve their life conditions in the kingdoms of the Eastern Mediterranean.

Since 2008, the "Shardana Project" has been developed in Corsica and Sardinia by the Centre of Studies J.-Fr. Champollion on Egyptology and Coptic Civilization, based in Genoa in cooperation with the University of Genoa and the University of the Mediterranean in Taranto. The project aims to gather as many data available about the Sherden culture inside and outside the Pharaonic Egypt. The project, conducted by the Egyptologist Giacomo Cavillier, aims to verify the possible interconnections and contacts between the Sherden and the local culture of these islands, in a broader Mediterranenan view, and to reassess all data available on this phenomenon.

The identification of the Sherden with the Nuragic Sardinians has also been supported by Sebastiano Tusa in his last book and in its presentations, and by Carlos Roberto Zorea, from the Complutense University of Madrid.

Another one to support it has been the Cypriot archaeologist Vassos Karageorghis, that found Nuragic pottery in Cyprus and wrote about the Nuragic role in places like the Syrian city of Tell Kazel.

It is most probable that among the Aegean immigrants there were also some refugees from Sardinia. This may corroborate the evidence from Medinet Habu that among the Sea Peoples there were also refugees from various part of the Mediterranean, some from Sardinia, the Shardana or Sherden. [...] It is probable that these Shardana went first to Crete and from there they joined a group of Cretans for an eastward adventure.

Adam Zertal, and more recently Bar Shay from Haifa University, have also argued that the Shardana were Nuragic Sardinians, and connected them to the site of El-Awat in Canaan.

When you look at plans of sites of the Shardana in Sardinia, in the second millennium BCE, throughout this entire period, you can see wavy walls, you can see corridors... you can see high heaps of stones, which were developed into the classical nuraghic culture of Sardinia. The only good architectural parallels are found in Sardinia and the Shardana culture

According to Malcolm H. Wiener "some of the Sea Peoples are likely to have started from Sardinia, Sicily, Italy, or the Balkans. Sardinia has long been viewed as a likely or possible homeland of the Sherdana in light of the similarity in names and Egyptian depictions of helmets resembling helmets found in Sardinia" while for the Austrian archeologist Reinhard Jung "the hypothesis of a connection between Šardana and Nuragic Sardinians is as old as the archaeology, but it could not be proven so far." (2017).

Late Bronze Age Nuragic pottery had been found in the Aegean and in the Eastern Mediterranean particularly in Crete at Kommos and on the island of Cyprus, at Kokkinokremnos, a site attributed to the Sea Peoples, and Hala Sultan Tekke. Nuragic pottery were also found in a tomb of the Ugarit harbour of Minet el-Beida.

== See also ==
- Paleo-Sardinian language
- List of ancient Corsican and Sardinian tribes
- History of Sardinia

== Bibliography ==
- Giovanni Garbini, I Filistei. Gli antagonisti di Israele, Rusconi, Milano, 1997
- N. K. Sandars (1987) [1978]. The Sea Peoples: Warriors of the ancient Mediterranean (edizione riveduta ed.). London: Thames and Hudson. ISBN 978-0-500-27387-6.
- Ugas, Giovanni (2016). Shardana e Sardegna : i popoli del mare, gli alleati del Nordafrica e la fine dei Grandi Regni (XV-XII secolo a.C.) (in Italian). Cagliari: Edizioni della Torre. ISBN 9788873434719. OCLC 976013893.
- Tusa, Sebastiano (2018). I popoli del Grande Verde : il Mediterraneo al tempo dei faraoni (in Italian). Ragusa: Edizioni Storia e Studi Sociali. ISBN 9788899168308. OCLC 1038750254.
- Mohamed Raafat Abbas, “A Survey of the Military Role of the Sherden Warriors in the Egyptian Army during the Ramesside Period”, Égypte Nilotique et Méditerranéenne 10 (2017), p. 7–23.
