= Ettore Pais =

Historian and politician

Ettore Pais (27 July 1856, Borgo San Dalmazzo, Piedmont, Italy – 1939, Rome) was an ancient historian, Latin epigrapher, and an Italian politician.

Pais was the son of Michele Pais Leoni, a nobleman from Sassari, Sardinia and Carlotta Tranchero, from Piemonte. He studied at Lucca and Florence from 1874, receiving his degree from Florence in 1878. Among his teachers were Atto Vannucci and the philologist Domenico Comparetti. After spending some years in Sardinia, he published La Sardegna prima del dominio romano in 1881. That same year he studied at Berlin with Theodor Mommsen and the two collaborated on the fifth volume of the Corpus Inscriptionum Latinarum that was published in 1884. He began his teaching career in Palermo in 1886 and moved to Pisa in 1888 where he would become professor of ancient history. Pais stayed there until 1899, when he began teaching at Naples, and later the University of Wisconsin–Madison from 1905. From 1910 to 1914 he was director of the Naples National Archaeological Museum and the excavations at Pompeii. Pais studied as a visiting scholar at leading universities around the world and received many honorary degrees, including those granted to him by the following: professor of history and Roman law from the University of Wisconsin–Madison, honorary degrees at Oxford, Chicago and Paris. He taught courses in Paris at the Sorbonne, in Bucharest, Prague, Madrid, Barcelona, Boston, Cambridge, New York, and Chicago.

In 1911 he published La civiltà dei nuraghi e lo sviluppo sociologico della Sardegna and in 1923 Storia della Sardegna e della Corsica durante il dominio romano. From 1923 until 1931 he was professor at the University of Rome and, from 1922 until his death, served in the Italian senate.
