= Corsi (people) =

Ancient people of Sardinia and Corsica

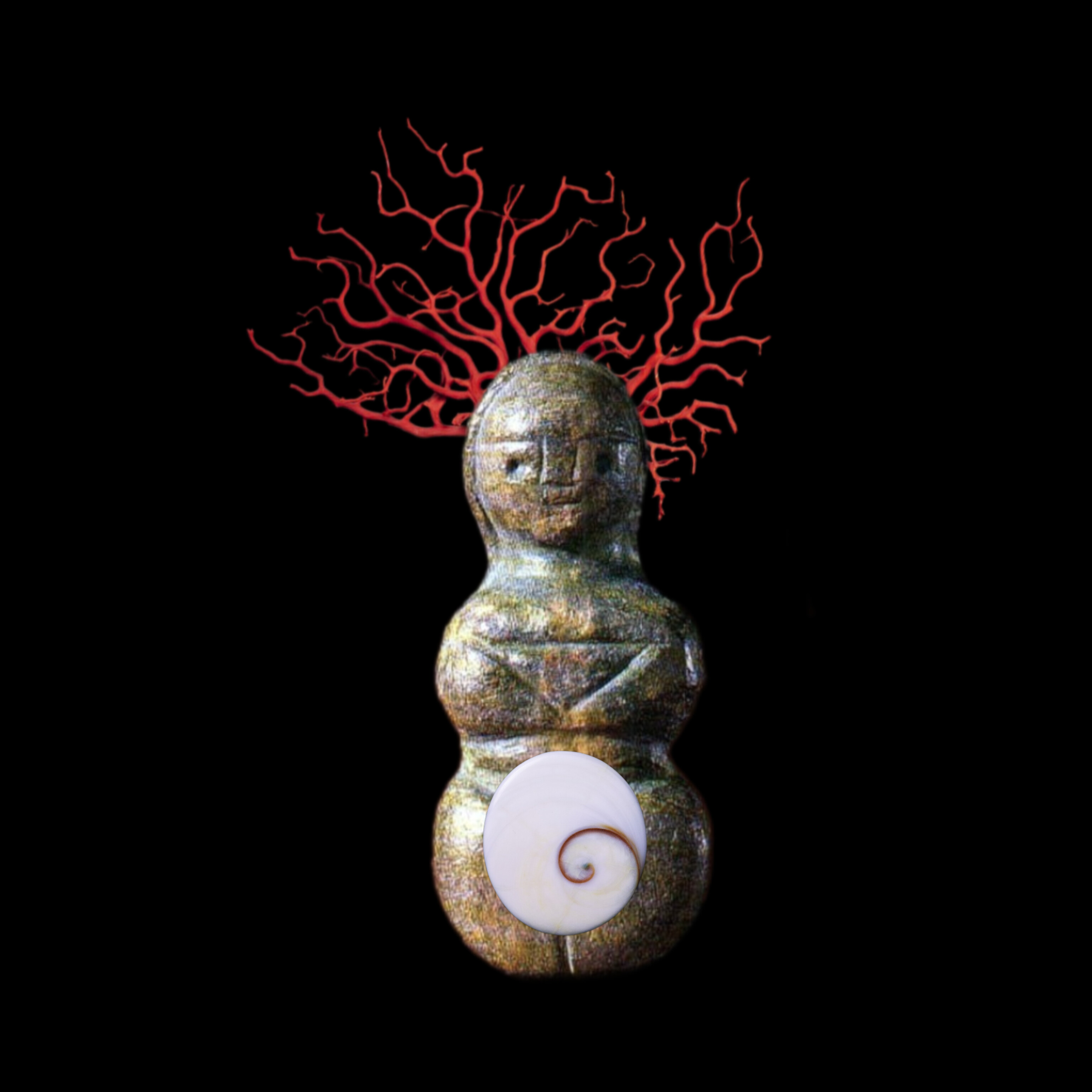
Corsican Mother Goddess from Campo Fiorello

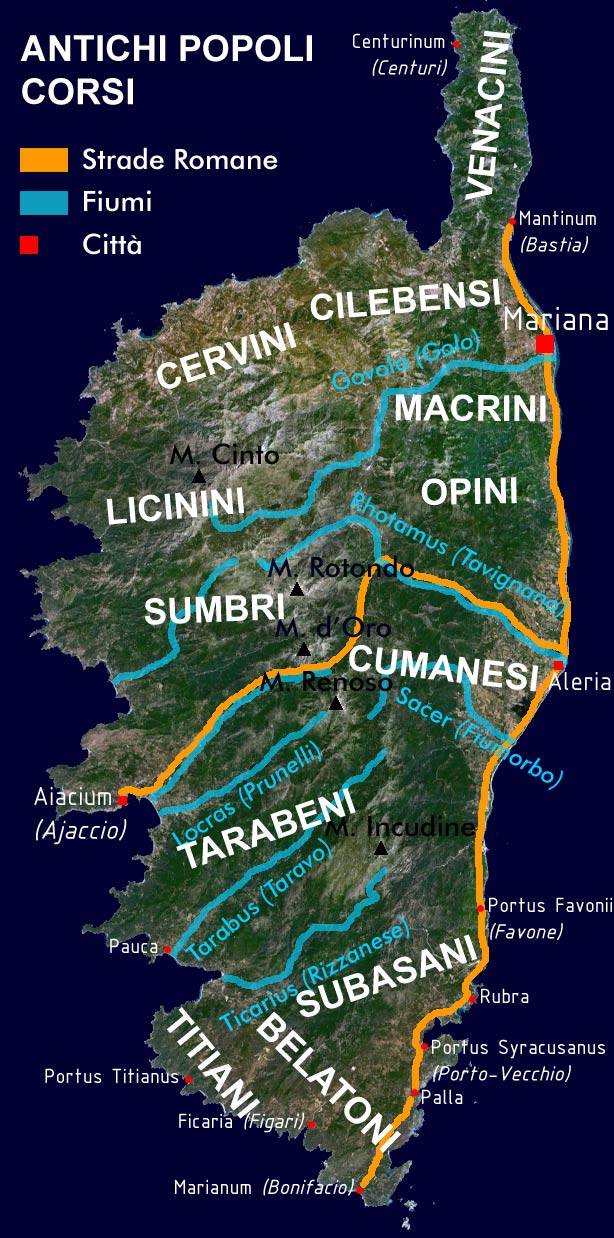
Ancient tribes of Corsica

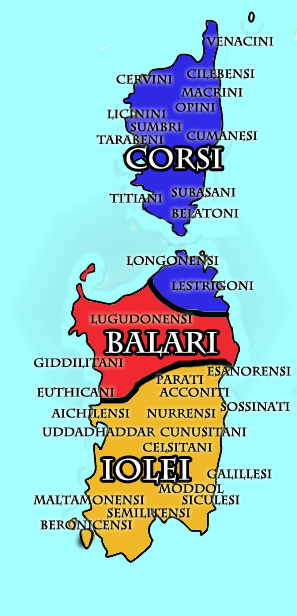
Ancient tribes of Corsica and Sardinia. The Corsi resided in the northernmost part of Sardinia.

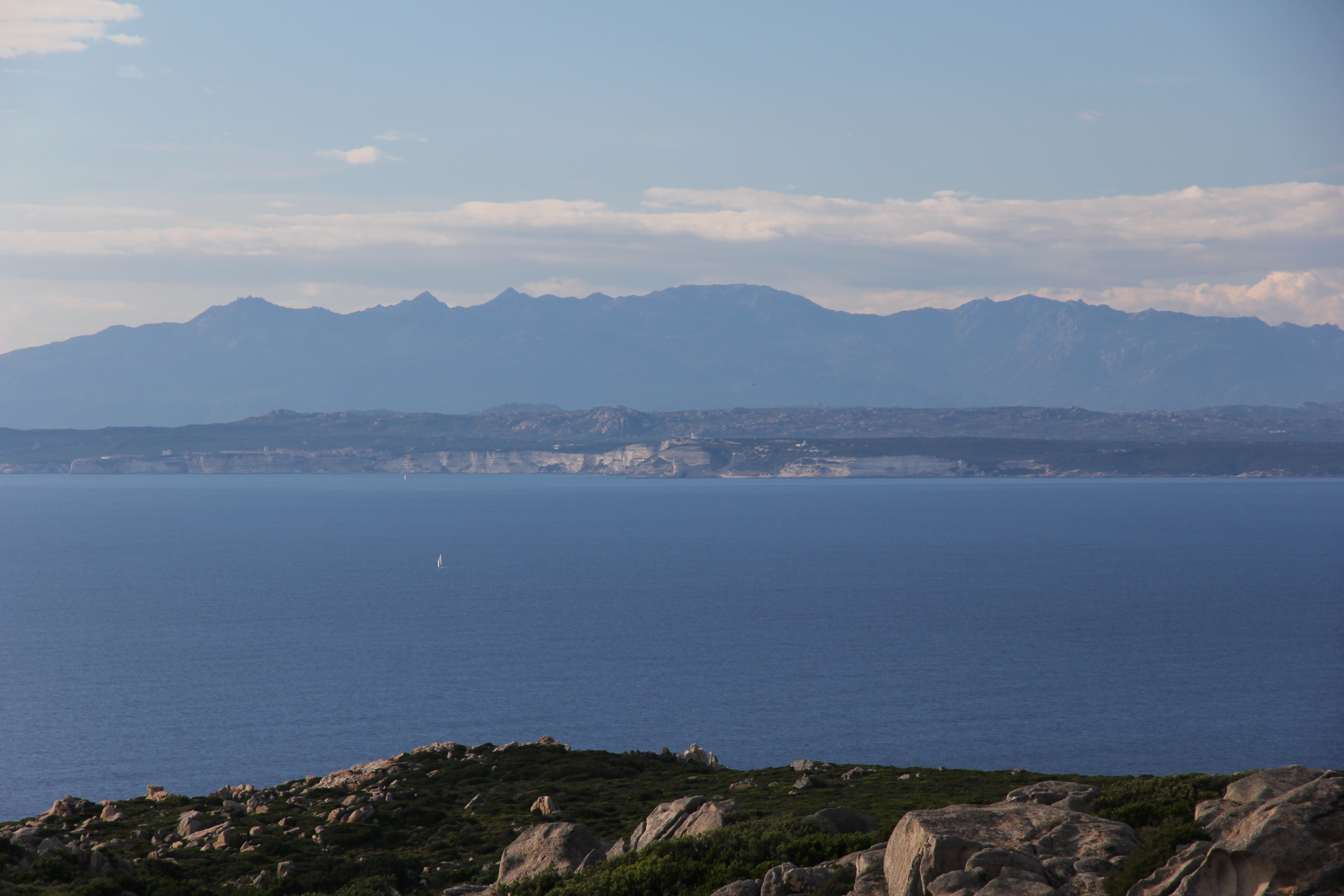
Strait of Bonifacio, the coast of Corsica as seen from Sardinia

The Corsi were an ancient people of Sardinia and Corsica, to which they gave the name, as well as one of the three major groups among which the ancient Sardinians considered themselves divided (along with the Balares and the Ilienses). Noted by Ptolemy (III, 3), they dwelt at the extreme north-east of Sardinia, in the region today known as Gallura, near the Tibulati and immediately north of the Coracenses.

According to historian Ettore Pais and archeologist Giovanni Ugas, the Corsi probably belonged to the Ligurian people. Similar was also the opinion of Seneca, who claimed that the Corsi from Corsica, where he had then been staying in exile, were of mixed origin, resulting from the continuous mingling of various ethnic groups of foreign origin, like the Ligures, the Greeks and the Iberians. In the myth, reported by Sallust, the peopling of Corsica is traced back to Corsa, a Ligurian woman who when grazing her cattle, went to the island, which then took her name. Pausanias in the Description of Greece wrote:

A large part of the population, oppressed by civil strife, left it (Corsica) and came to Sardinia; there they took up their abode, confining themselves to the highlands. The Sardinians, however, call them by the name of Corsicans, which they brought with them from home [...] When the Carthaginians were at the height of their sea power, they overcame all in Sardinia except the Ilians and Corsicans, who were kept from slavery by the strength of the mountains.

— Pausanias, Description of Greece, 10.17

== See also ==
- List of ancient Corsican and Sardinian tribes
- Paleo-Corsican language
- Nuragic civilization
- Torrean civilization

== Bibliography ==
- Zucca, Raimondo (1996). La Corsica romana. Oristano: S'Alvure. ISBN 9788873831266.
- Ugas, Giovanni (1 January 2006). L'alba dei nuraghi. Cagliari: Fabula Editore. ISBN 978-88-89661-00-0.
