= Eduardo Blasco Ferrer =

Spanish-Italian linguist and professor

Eduardo Blasco Ferrer (Barcelona, 1956 – Bastia, 12 January 2017) was a Spanish-Italian linguist and a professor at the University of Cagliari, Sardinia. He is best known as the author of several studies about the Paleo-Sardinian and Sardinian language.

== Biography ==
He graduated in 1981 with a degree in Romance linguistics from the University of Erlangen–Nuremberg, a subject in which he earned a Doctor of Philosophy with Heinrich Kuen, and landed at the University of Cagliari as a lecturer in the Catalan language in the Faculty of Education.

He was then a lecturer at the universities of Sassari, Bonn, Florence, and Munich; since 1993 he has been back in Cagliari, initially as a lecturer in the history of the Italian language, and since 1996 as a lecturer in Sardinian linguistics.

He worked more on the study and teaching of the Sardinian language, but also turned his attention to Catalan, Spanish, Ladin and Italian.

== Books ==
- Grammatica storica del catalano e dei suoi dialetti con speciale riguardo all'algherese. Tübingen: G. Narr, c1984.
- La lingua sarda contemporanea : grammatica del logudorese e del campidanese : norma e varietà dell'uso : sintesi storica. Cagliari : Della Torre, c1986.
- Storia linguistica della Sardegna. Tübingen : Niemeyer, 1984.
- Le parlate dell'alta Ogliastra : analisi dialettologica : saggio di storia linguistica e culturale. Cagliari : Edizioni Della Torre, 1988.
- Ello, ellus : grammatica sarda. Nuoro : Poliedro, c1994.
- La lingua nel tempo : variazione e cambiamento in latino, italiano e sardo. Cagliari : CUEC, 1995.
- Breve corso di linguistica italiana : con facsimili, edizione e commento d'un testo quattrocentesco ad uso di seminari ed esercitazioni. Cagliari : CUEC, 1996.
- Pro domo : grammatica essenziale della lingua sarda. Cagliari : Condaghes, 1998.
- Italiano e tedesco : un confronto linguistico. Torino : Paravia scriptorium, c1999.
- Italiano, sardo e lingue moderne a scuola. Milano : F. Angeli, 2003.
- Storia della lingua sarda. Cagliari : CUEC, 2009.
- Paleosardo. Le radici linguistiche della Sardegna neolitica. Berlin : De Gruyter, 2010. ISBN 978-3-11-023560-9
