= Corpicenses =

Ancient people

The Corpicenses were an ancient people of Sardinia, noted by Ptolemy (III, 3). They dwelt south of the Rucensi and north of the Scapitani and the Siculensi.
