= Salcitani =

Ancient people of Sardinia

The Salcitani were an ancient people of Sardinia, noted by Ptolemy (III, 3). They dwelt south of the Carenses and the Cunusitani and north of the Æsaronenses.
