= Neapolitani =

The Neapolitani were an ancient people of Sardinia, as noted by Ptolemy (III, 3). They dwelt south of the Scapitani and the Siculensi and north of the Solcitani and the Noritani. Their chief city was Neapolis, located approximately 20 km north of modern Guspini.
