= Rucensi =

Ancient people of Sardinia

The Rucensi were an ancient people of Sardinia, noted by Ptolemy (III, 3). They dwelt south of the Æchilenenses (also called Cornenses) and north of the Celsitani and the Corpicenses.
