= Scapitani =

Ancient community found in Sardinia

The Scapitani were an ancient people of Sardinia, noted by Ptolemy (III, 3). They dwelt south of the Celsitani and the Corpicenses and north of the Neapolitani and the Valentini.

== See Further ==
- Ptolemy's Geography online
