= Tibula =

Tibula (Greek: Τιβουλα, Ptol.), was an ancient town of Sardinia, near the northern extremity of the island, which appears to have been the customary landing-place for travelers coming from Corsica; for which reason the Itineraries give no less than four lines of route, taking their departure from Tibula as a starting-point. (Itin. Ant. pp. 78–83.)

== Location ==
Its position is a matter of great uncertainty. That assigned to it by Ptolemy would place it on the site of Castelsardo (province of Sassari) on the north coast of the island, and only about 30 km from Porto Torres, but this is wholly incompatible with the statements of the Itineraries, and must certainly be erroneous. Indeed, Ptolemy himself places the Tibulati or Tibulates or Tibulatii (Τιβουλάτιοι), who must have been closely connected with the town of that name, in the extreme north of the island (Ptol. iii. 3. § 6), and all the data derived from the Itineraries concur in the same result. The position assigned it by De la Marmora, and adopted by Smith is the port or small bay called Porto di Lungo Sardo, almost close to the northernmost point of the island, the Errebantium Promontorium of Ptolemy. (De la Marmora, Voy. en Sardaigne, vol. ii. pp. 421–32, where the whole question is fully examined and discussed.) The editors of the Barrington Atlas of the Greek and Roman World place Tibula at Santa Teresa Gallura (province of Olbia-Tempio).
