= Barbagia =

Region of inner Sardinia

Coordinates: 40°N 9.2°E

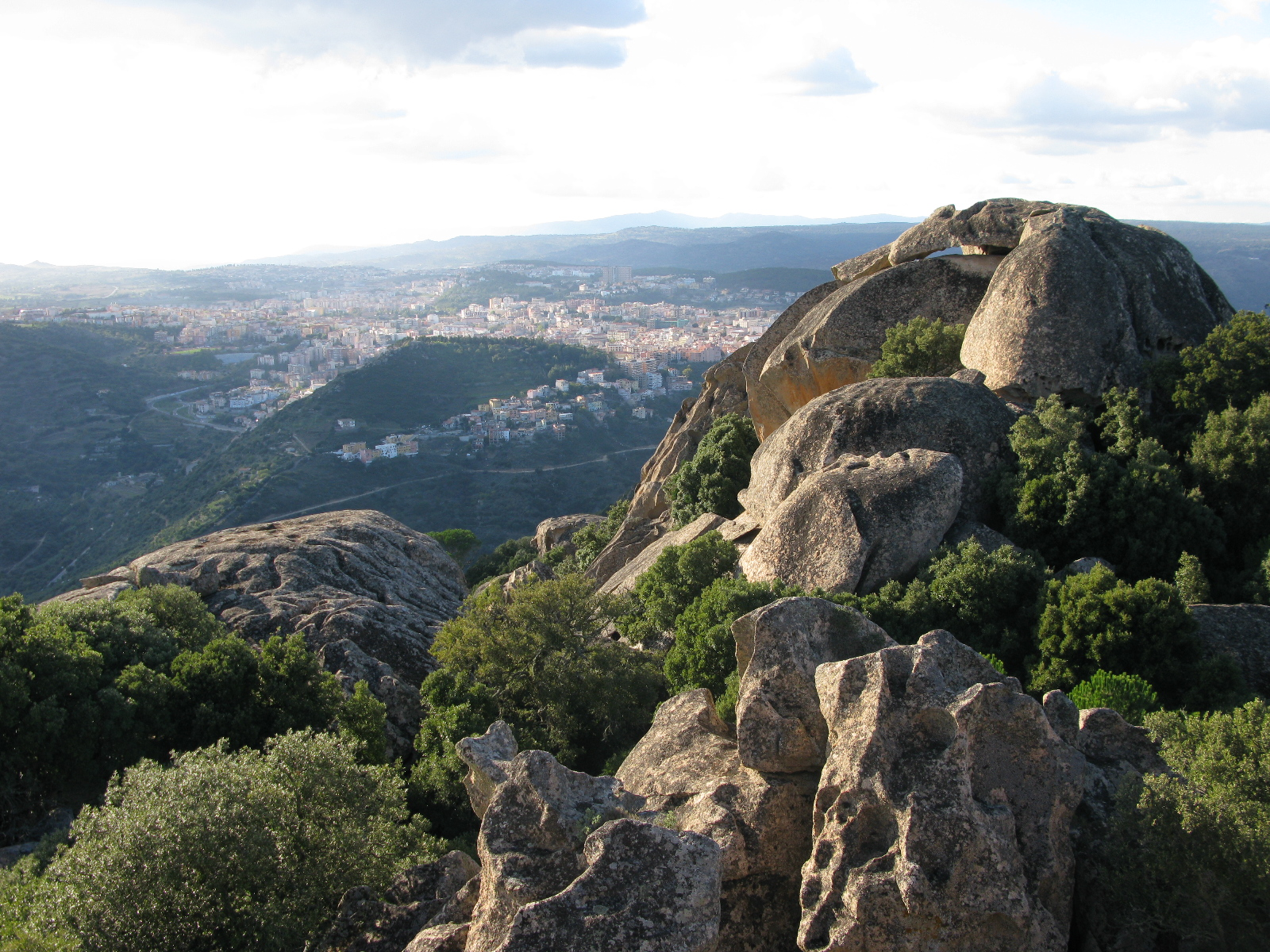
- A view of the mountains around Nuoro, the main urban center in Barbagia

Highest point
- Peak: Punta La Marmora/Perdas Carpías
- Elevation: 1,834 m (6,017 ft)

Dimensions
- Area: 1,300.37 km^{2} (502.08 mi^{2})

Naming
- Native name: Barbagia (Italian); Barbàgia (Sardinian); Barbàza (Sardinian)

Geography
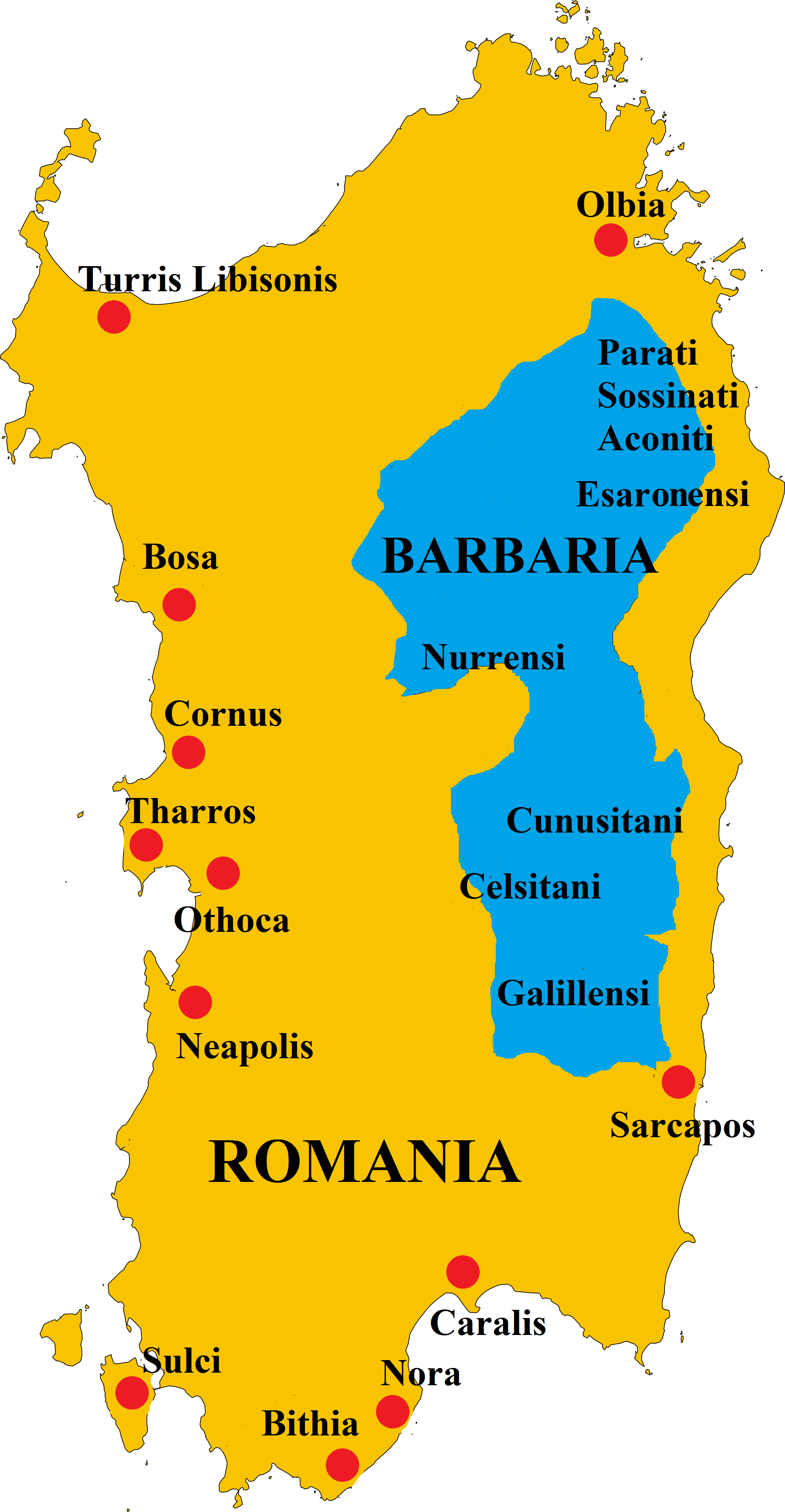
- Localisation of the ancient region of Barbaria (in blue) in relation to the Roman-controlled areas (in yellow)
- Country: Italy

Barbagia (Italian: [barˈbaːdʒa]; Sardinian: Barbàgia or Barbàza) is a geographical, cultural and natural region of inner Sardinia, contained for the most part in the province of Nuoro and Ogliastra and located alongside the Gennargentu massif.

The name comes from Cicero, who described the land as inhabited by barbarians; Roman domination over this part of the island was in fact never more than nominal as a result of the Roman-Sardinian Wars. This word shares its etymology with the now antiquated Barbary.

The Sardinians, many of whose revolts came from this area, were also mocked by the ancient Romans with the pejorative term latrones mastrucati 'thieves wearing rough woolen garments'.

In 594, Pope Gregory the Great wrote a letter to Hospito, a Christian whom he calls the "leader of the Barbaricini" (dux barbaricinorum). Hospito apparently permitted the evangelisation of pagan Barbagia by Christian missionaries.

The area is usually divided into five Barbagias: the Barbagia of Ollolai, the Barbagia of Seulo, the Barbagia of Belvì, the Mandrolisai, and finally the Barbagia Trigònia, the historical name by which the area of Ogliastra was once referred to. The latter two are named after a sub-region, and the others after their main villages.

The area comprises mainly rocky and steep hills and mountains, and there is little human presence. Barbagia is one of the least populated areas in Europe, which has allowed Barbagia to better preserve the island's cultural and natural treasures. According to a thesis by the archaeologist Giovanni Lilliu, Sardinian history has always been characterised by what he called the "constant of Sardinian resistance": opposition to various invaders who attempted, at various times, to lord over the indigenous inhabitants. Barbagia is one of the few Sardinian regions where the Sardinian language in its own varieties, both Nuorese and Campidanese, is still spoken on an everyday basis, while the rest of the island has mostly already undergone thorough Italianization and language shift to Italian.

One of the most important villages is Gavoi. Orgosolo was famous for its bandits and kidnappers and typical murals. Oliena is well known for its wines (especially the Nepente, a wine made with Cannonau grapes). Another well known town is Fonni, the highest town in Sardinia at more than 1,000 meters above sea level. Fonni is also the gateway to the Gennargentu mountain system.

The economy consists of agriculture, sheep breeding, art and tradition related business, tourism and light industry.

== See also ==
- Roman-Sardinian Wars
- Cantu a tenore
