= Carenses =

Ancient people of Sardinia

The Carenses were an ancient people of Sardinia, noted by Ptolemy (III, 3). They dwelt south of the Coracenses and north of the Salcitani and the Lucuidonenses.
