= Siculensi =

The Siculensi were an ancient people of Sardinia, noted by Ptolemy (III, 3). They dwelt south of the Celsitani and the Corpicenses and north of the Neapolitani and the Valentini.
