= Æsaronenses =

Ancient tribe of Sardinia

The Æsaronenses or Aesaronenses were an ancient people of Sardinia, noted by Ptolemy (III, 3). They dwelt south of the Salcitani and the Lucuidonenses and north of the Æchilenenses or Cornenses.
