= Æchilenenses =

Ancient people of Sardinia

The Æchilenenses also called the Cornenses and Æchilenses were an ancient people of Sardinia, noted by Ptolemy (III, 3). They dwelt south of the Æsaronenses and north of the Rucensi.
