= Solcitani =

The Solcitani (also called the Sulcitani), were an ancient people of Sardinia, as noted by Ptolemy (III, 3). They dwelt in the extreme southern part of the island, immediately south of the Neapolitani and the Valentini. Their chief city was Sulci, adjacent to the modern Sant'Antioco.
