= Coracenses =

Ancient people of Sardinia

The Coracenses were an ancient people of Sardinia, noted by Ptolemy (III, 3). They dwelt south of the Tibulati and the Corsi (for whom Corsica is named) and north of the Carenses and the Cunusitani.
