= Tibulati =

The Tibulati (Greek: Τιβουλάτιοι), also called Tibulates and Tibulatii, were an ancient people of Sardinia, noted by Ptolemy (III, 3). They dwelt at the extreme north of the island, about the ancient city of Tibula, near the Corsi (for whom Corsica is named) and immediately north of the Coracenses.
