= Giovanni Lilliu =

Italian archaeologist, academician and publicist

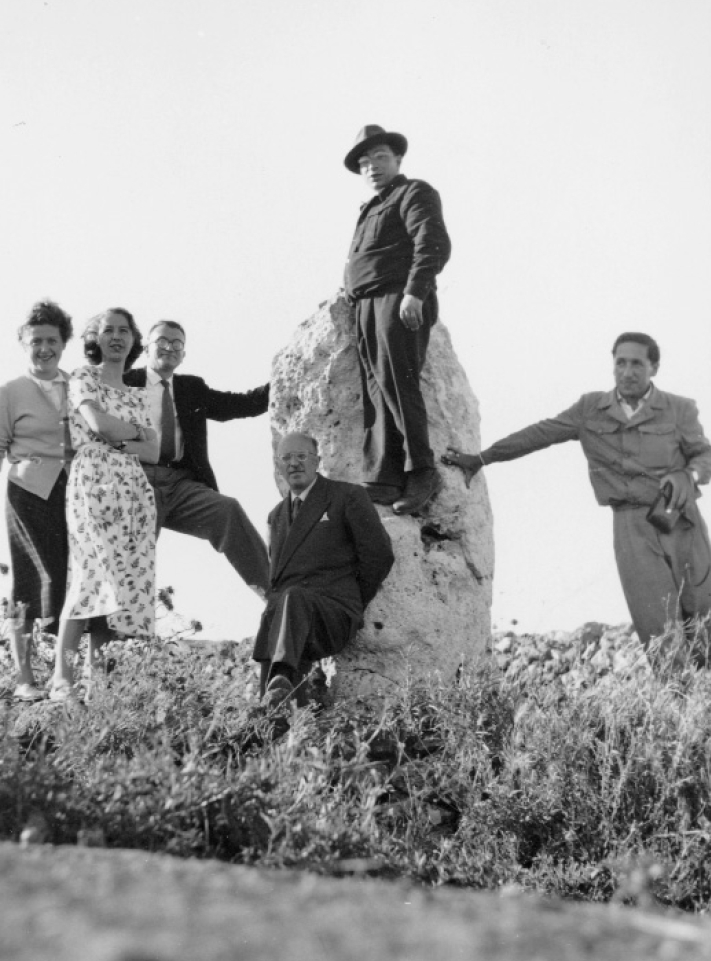
Giovanni Lilliu (in the center, above the menhir) and other archaeologists, including Massimo Pallottino, at the site of Monte d'Accoddi in 1954

Giovanni Lilliu (13 March 1914 in Barumini, Italy – 19 February 2012 in Cagliari), was an archeologist, academician, publicist, politician and an expert of the Nuragic civilization. Largely due to his scientific and archeologic work in the Su Nuraxi di Barumini in Sardinia, Italy, the site was inscribed on the UNESCO list of World Heritage Sites in 1997.

== Biography ==
Graduated in Classics, he was a student of Ugo Rellini at the "National School of Archaeology" in Rome, where he obtained his specialization. From 1943 to 1945 he worked in the "Superintendency of Antiquities of Sardinia". In 1972 he founded and then directed for twenty years the "School of specialization in Sardinian Studies" of the University of Cagliari, holding the role of Full Professor of Paleethnology teaching Sardinian Antiquities.

He considered himself, together with Ernesto de Martino and Alberto Mario Cirese, one of the founders of the Anthropological School of Cagliari, both as professor of Paleethnology, and as founder and then for a long time President of the Higher Regional Ethnographic Institute (ISRE) of Nuoro, and especially for his broad transdisciplinary interests in the study of Prehistory. For a long time he was Dean of the Faculty of Letters and Philosophy.

He directed the magazine "Studi Sardi" and the "Nuovo Bollettino Archeologico Sardo". He also carried out political activity at a local level, having been a regional councilor from 1969 to 1974 and a municipal councilor in Cagliari from 1975 to 1980, always in the ranks of the Democrazia Cristiana. He was affiliate with numerous Italian and foreign scientific institutes and since 1990 a member of the Accademia dei Lincei of Rome.

In 2007 he received the "Sardus Pater" honor from the Autonomous Region of Sardinia, established in that year as a recognition to be given to Italian and foreign citizens who have distinguished themselves for particular merits of cultural, social or moral value and have given prestige to Sardinia. He died in Cagliari on 19 February 2012 at the age of 97.

== Bibliography ==
- La civiltà dei Sardi dal neolitico all'età dei nuraghi, Torino, 1967
- "I nuraghi della Sardegna" dans le vie d'Italia, 1953
- La civiltà dei Sardi dal Neolitico all'età dei Nuraghi, Torino, 1963
- Sculture della Sardegna nuragica, Cagliari, 1966
- La civiltà nuragica, Sassari 1982
- Cultura e culture, Sassar, 1995
- Arte e religione della Sardegna prenuragica, Sassari 1999.
- La costante resistenziale sarda, Nuoro, 2002
- La civiltà dei Sardi dal Paleolitico all'età dei Nuraghi, Nuoro 2004
- Lilliu, Giovanni (2004). Sentidu de libbertade (in Sardinian) (1 ed.). Cagliari: CUEC. ISBN 88-8467-183-3. OCLC 56122010.
- I nuraghi. Torri preistoriche di Sardegna, Nuoro 2005
- Sardegna Nuragica, Nuoro 2006
- Sardegna e Mediterraneo negli scritti di Giovanni Lilliu Volumes 1-6, 2008
- Lilliu, Giovanni (2008). Contu, Alberto (ed.). Opere (in Italian). Zonza Editori. ISBN 978-88-8470-209-8.
