= Celsitani =

The Celsitani were an ancient people of Sardinia, noted by Ptolemy (III, 3). They dwelt south of the Rucensi and north of the Scapitani and the Siculensi. Their names were found on coins in Spain four centuries before the Roman Empire.
