= Cunusitani =

Ancient people of Sardinia

The Cunusitani were an ancient people of Sardinia, noted by Ptolemy (III, 3). They dwelt south of the Coracenses and north of the Salcitani and the Lucuidonenses.
