= Noritani =

The Noritani also called Norenses were an ancient people of Sardinia, as noted by Ptolemy (III, 3). They dwelt in the extreme southern part of the island, immediately south of the Neapolitani and the Valentini. Their chief town was Nora (modern Pula).
