= Lucuidonenses =

The Lucuidonenses were an ancient people of Sardinia, noted by Ptolemy (III, 3). They dwelt south of the Carenses and the Cunusitani and north of the Æsaronenses.
