= Su patriotu sardu a sos feudatarios =

Sardinian protest and antifeudal folk song

English: The Sardinian Patriot to the Lords
- Official anthem of Sardinia
- Also known as: Procurade 'e moderare (English: Endeavor to Moderate)
- Lyrics: Frantziscu Ignatziu Mannu (Francesco Ignazio Mannu)
- Adopted: 2018

Audio sample
- Su patriotu sardu a sos feudatarios: file; help

"Su patriotu sardu a sos feudatarios" ("The Sardinian Patriot to the Lords"), widely known also by its incipit as "Procurade 'e moderare" ("Endeavor to Moderate"), is a protest and antifeudal folk song in the culture of Sardinia.

The chant was written in Logudorese Sardinian by the lawyer Francesco Ignazio Mannu (Sardinian: Frantziscu Ignàtziu Mannu) on the occasion of the Sardinian mass revolts (1793–1796) against the Savoyard feudal system, that culminated with the execution or expulsion from the island of the officials of the ruling House of Savoy on 28 April 1794 (officially commemorated today as Sa die de sa Sardigna or "Sardinian people's day"). Because of its temporal coincidence with the French Revolution, the song was also nicknamed by J. W. Tyndale and other scholars like Auguste Boullier as "the Sardinian Marseillaise".

Long regarded as a national anthem in Sardinian culture, "Su patriotu sardu a sos feudatarios" was officially declared as the island's anthem in 2018.

== Lyrics ==
The anthem is a poetry written in octave with a metrical pattern of a bb cc dd e, and its content resounds with typical Enlightenment themes. The entire text consists of 47 stanzas for a total of 376 verses, and describes the miserable state of Sardinia at the end of the 18th century, kept as an overseas dependency of the House of Savoy with an archaic feudal system that would only advantage the feudatories and leave a Sardinian only with "a rope to hang himself" (stanza 34, verse 272).

The incipit is, in fact, addressed to the feudatories' arrogance, regarded as the people being most at fault for the island's decadence: Procurad'e moderare, Barones, sa tirannia… ("Endeavor to moderate, Oh barons! your tyranny...").

The disastrous socio-economic situation plaguing the island is described in detail. The oppressors from the Mainland are also harshly criticized: according to the poet, they did not care about Sardinia, and the only thing that would concern them was to surround themselves with richness and loot through the cheap exploitation of the island's resources, in a manner analogous to what Spain had done on the Indies ("Sardinia to the Piedmontese was like a golden land; what Spain found in the Indies, they discovered here": stanza 32, verses 249–251).

The chant closes with a vigorous incitement to revolt, sealed with a terse Sardinian saying: Cando si tenet su bentu est prezisu bentulare ("When the wind is in your harbour, is the proper time to winnow": stanza 47, verse 375–376).

Here, following the original lyrics in Sardinian.

Procurad'e moderare,
barones, sa tirannia,
chi si no, pro vida mia
torrades a pe' in terra!
Declarada est già sa gherra
contra de sa prepotenzia:
e incomintza' sa passenzia
in su populu a mancare!

Mirade ch'est'atzendende
contra de ois su fogu,
mirade chi no e' giogu,
chi sa cosa andat 'e veras;
mirade chi sas aeras
minettana temporale;
zente cussizzada male,
iscultade sa oghe mia

No apprettedas s 'isprone
A su poveru ronzinu,
Si no in mesu caminu
S'arrempellat appuradu;
Mizzi chi est lanzu e cansadu
E non 'nde podet piusu;
Finalmente a fundu in susu
S'imbastu 'nd hat a bettare

Su pobulu chi in profundu
Letargu fit sepultadu
Finalmente despertadu
S'abbizzat ch 'est in cadena,
Ch'istat suffrende sa pena
De s'indolenzia antiga:
Feudu, legge inimiga
A bona filosofia!

Che ch'esseret una inza,
Una tanca, unu cunzadu,
Sas biddas hana donadu
De regalu o a bendissione;
Comente unu cumone
De bestias berveghinas
Sos homines et feminas
Han bendidu cun sa cria

Pro pagas mizzas de liras,
Et tale olta pro niente,
Isclavas eternamente
Tantas pobulassiones,
E migliares de persones
Servint a unu tirannu.
Poveru genere humanu,
Povera sarda zenia!

Deghe o doighi familias
S'han partidu sa Sardigna,
De una manera indigna
Si 'nde sunt fattas pobiddas;
Divididu han sas biddas
In sa zega antichidade,
Però sa presente edade
Lu pensat rimediare.

Naschet su Sardu soggettu
A milli cumandamentos,
Tributos e pagamentos
Chi faghet a su segnore,
In bestiamen e in laore
In dinari e in natura,
E pagat pro sa pastura,
E pagat pro laorare.

Meda innantis de sos feudos
Esistiana sas biddas,
Et issas fìni pobiddas
De saltos e biddattones.
Comente a bois, Barones,
Sa cosa anzena est passada?
Cuddu chi bos l'hat dada
Non bos la podiat dare.

No est mai presumibile
Chi voluntariamente
Hapat sa povera zente
Zedidu a tale derettu;
Su titulu, ergo, est infettu
De infeudassione
E i sas biddas reione
Tenene de l'impugnare

Sas tassas in su prinzipiu
Esigiazis limitadas,
Dae pustis sunt istadas
Ogni die aumentende,
A misura chi creschende
Sezis andados in fastu,
A misura chi in su gastu
Lassezis s 'economia.

Non bos balet allegare
S'antiga possessione
Cun minettas de presone,
Cun gastigos e cun penas,
Cun zippos e cun cadenas
Sos poveros ignorantes
Derettos esorbitantes
Hazis forzadu a pagare

A su mancu s 'impleerent
In mantenner sa giustissia
Castighende sa malissia
De sos malos de su logu,
A su mancu disaogu
Sos bonos poterant tenner,
Poterant andare e benner
Seguros per i sa via.

Est cussu s'unicu fine
De dogni tassa e derettu,
Chi seguru et chi chiettu
Sutta sa legge si vivat,
De custu fine nos privat
Su barone pro avarissia;
In sos gastos de giustissia
Faghet solu economia

Su primu chi si presenta
Si nominat offissiale,
Fattat bene o fattat male
Bastat non chirchet salariu,
Procuradore o notariu,
O camareri o lacaju,
Siat murru o siat baju,
Est bonu pro guvernare.

Bastat chi prestet sa manu
Pro fagher crescher sa renta,
Bastat si fetat cuntenta
Sa buscia de su Segnore;
Chi aggiuet a su fattore
A crobare prontamente
E s'algunu est renitente
Chi l'iscat esecutare

A boltas, de podattariu,
Guvernat su cappellanu,
Sas biddas cun una manu
Cun s'attera sa dispensa.
Feudatariu, pensat
Chi sos vassallos non tenes
Solu pro crescher sos benes,
Solu pro los iscorzare.

Su patrimoniu, sa vida
Pro difender su villanu
Cun sas armas a sa manu
Cheret ch 'istet notte e die;
Già ch 'hat a esser gasie
Proite tantu tributu?
Si non si nd'hat haer fruttu
Est locura su pagare.

Si su barone non faghet
S'obbligassione sua,
Vassallu, de parte tua
A nudda ses obbligadu;
Sos derettos ch'hat crobadu
In tantos annos passodos
Sunu dinaris furados
E ti los devet torrare.

Sas rèntas servini solu
Pro mantenner cicisbeas,
Pro carrozzas e livreas,
Pro inutiles servissios,
Pro alimentare sos vissios,
Pro giogare a sa bassetta,
E pro poder sa braghetta
Fora de domo isfogare,

Pro poder tenner piattos
Bindighi e vinti in sa mesa,
Pro chi potat sa marchesa
Sempre andare in portantina;
S'iscarpa istrinta mischina,
La faghet andare a toppu,
Sas pedras punghene troppu
E non podet camminare

Pro una littera solu
Su vassallu, poverinu,
Faghet dies de caminu
A pe', senz 'esser pagadu,
Mesu iscurzu e isporzadu
Espostu a dogni inclemenzia;
Eppuru tenet passienzia,
Eppuru devet cagliare.

Ecco comente s 'impleat
De su poveru su suore!
Comente, Eternu Segnore,
Suffrides tanta ingiustissia?
Bois, Divina Giustissia,
Remediade sas cosas,
Bois, da ispinas, rosas
Solu podides bogare.

Trabagliade trabagliade
O poveros de sas biddas,
Pro mantenner in zittade
Tantos caddos de istalla,
A bois lassant sa palla
Issos regoglin' su ranu,
E pensant sero e manzanu
Solamente a ingrassare.

Su segnor feudatariu
A sas undighi si pesat.
Dae su lettu a sa mesa,
Dae sa mesa a su giogu.
Appustis pro disaogu
Andat a cicisbeare;
Giompid'a iscurigare
Teatru, ballu, allegria

Cantu differentemente,
su vassallu passat s'ora!
Innantis de s'aurora
Già est bessidu in campagna;
Bentu o nie in sa muntagna.
In su paris sole ardente.
Oh! poverittu, comente
Lu podet agguantare!.

Cun su zappu e cun s'aradu
Penat tota sa die,
A ora de mesudie
Si zibat de solu pane.
Mezzus paschidu est su cane
De su Barone, in zittade,
S'est de cudda calidade
Chi in falda solent portare.

Timende chi si reforment
Disordines tantu mannos,
Cun manizzos et ingannos
Sas Cortes han impedidu;
Et isperdere han cherfidu
Sos patrizios pius zelantes,
Nende chi fint petulantes
Et contra sa monarchia

Ai caddos ch'in favore
De sa patria han peroradu,
Chi s'ispada hana ogadu
Pro sa causa comune,
O a su tuju sa fune
Cheriant ponner meschinos.
O comente a Giacobinos
Los cheriant massacrare.

Però su chelu hat difesu
Sos bonos visibilmente,
Atterradu bat su potente,
Ei s'umile esaltadu,
Deus, chi s'est declaradu
Pro custa patria nostra,
De ogn'insidia bostra
Isse nos hat a salvare.

Perfidu feudatariu!
Pro interesse privadu
Protettore declaradu
Ses de su piemontesu.
Cun issu ti fist intesu
Cun meda fazilidade:
Isse papada in zittade
E tue in bidda a porfia.

Fit pro sos piemontesos
Sa Sardigna una cucagna;
Che in sas Indias s 'Ispagna
Issos s 'incontrant inoghe;
Nos alzaiat sa oghe
Finzas unu camareri,
O plebeu o cavaglieri
Si deviat umiliare...

Issos dae custa terra
Ch'hana ogadu migliones,
Beniant senza calzones
E si nd'handaiant gallonados;
Mai ch'esserent istados
Chi ch'hana postu su fogu
Malaittu cuddu logu
Chi criat tale zenìa

Issos inoghe incontràna
Vantaggiosos imeneos,
Pro issos fint sos impleos,
Pro issos sint sos onores,
Sas dignidades mazores
De cheia, toga e ispada:
Et a su sardu restada
Una fune a s'impiccare!

Sos disculos nos mandàna
Pro castigu e curressione,
Cun paga e cun pensione
Cun impleu e cun patente;
In Moscovia tale zente
Si mandat a sa Siberia
Pro chi morzat de miseria,
Però non pro guvernare

Intantu in s'insula nostra
Numerosa gioventude
De talentu e de virtude
Ozïosa la lassàna:
E si algun 'nd'impleàna
Chircaiant su pius tontu
Pro chi lis torrat a contu
cun zente zega a trattare.

Si in impleos subalternos
Algunu sardu avanzàna,
In regalos non bastada
Su mesu de su salariu,
Mandare fit nezessariu
Caddos de casta a Turinu
Et bonas cassas de binu,
Cannonau e malvasia.

De dare a su piemontesu
Sa prata nostra ei s'oro
Est de su guvernu insoro
Massimu fundamentale,
Su regnu andet bene o male
No lis importat niente,
Antis creen incumbeniente
Lassarelu prosperare.

S'isula hat arruinadu
Custa razza de bastardos;
Sos privilegios sardos
Issos nos hana leadu,
Dae sos archivios furadu
Nos hana sas mezzus pezzas
Et che iscritturas bezzas
Las hana fattas bruiare.

De custu flagellu, in parte,
Deus nos hat liberadu.
Sos sardos ch'hana ogadu
Custu dannosu inimigu,
E tue li ses amigu,
O sardu barone indignu,
E tue ses in s'impignu
De 'nde lu fagher torrare

Pro custu, iscaradamente,
Preigas pro su Piemonte,
Falzu chi portas in fronte
Su marcu de traitore;
Fizzas tuas tant'honore
Faghent a su furisteri,
Mancari siat basseri
Bastat chi sardu no siat.

S'accas 'andas a Turinu
Inie basare dès
A su minustru sos pes
E a atter su... già m 'intendes;
Pro ottenner su chi pretendes
Bendes sa patria tua,
E procuras forsis a cua
Sos sardos iscreditare

Sa buscia lassas inie,
Et in premiu 'nde torras
Una rughitta in pettorra
Una giae in su traseri;
Pro fagher su quarteri
Sa domo has arruinodu,
E titolu has acchistadu
De traitore e ispia.

Su chelu non faghet sempre
Sa malissia triunfare,
Su mundu det reformare
Sas cosas ch 'andana male,
Su sistema feudale
Non podet durare meda?
Custu bender pro moneda
Sos pobulos det sensare.

S'homine chi s 'impostura
Haiat già degradadu
Paret chi a s'antigu gradu
Alzare cherfat de nou;
Paret chi su rangu sou
Pretendat s'humanidade;
Sardos mios, ischidade
E sighide custa ghia.

Custa, pobulos, est s'hora
D'estirpare sos abusos!
A terra sos malos usos,
A terra su dispotismu;
Gherra, gherra a s'egoismu,
Et gherra a sos oppressores;
Custos tirannos minores
Est prezisu humiliare.

Si no, chalchi die a mossu
Bo 'nde segade' su didu.
Como ch'est su filu ordidu
A bois toccat a tèssere,
Mizzi chi poi det essere
Tardu s 'arrepentimentu;
Cando si tenet su bentu
Est prezisu bentulare.

== Editions, translations and literary critique ==
The anthem was illegally published in Sassari in 1796 and not in the nearby island of Corsica, as it was believed until recently. After all, Sassari was already taken by the rebels and, in 1796, ruled by the alternos Giovanni Maria Angioy.

The song was first translated into another language by John Warre Tyndale, in English, in 1849 ("Endeavor to Moderate..."), while Auguste Boullier would publish a French translation in his own book (Essai sur le dialecte et les chants populaires de la Sardaigne) in June 1864 with the incipit being "Songez à modérer...".

The anthem, aside from any copy that had been illegally circulating on the island, was published for the first time in Sardinia in 1865 by Giovanni Spano and later by Enrico Costa, who also made an Italian translation. Sebastiano Satta would provide another Italian translation on the centenary of Giovanni Maria Angioy's triumphant entrance in the city. In 1979, B. Granzer and B. Schütze would translate the song into German, with the title "Die Tyrannei".

Raffa Garzia compared the song to Giuseppe Parini's "Il giorno". The scholar also drew attention to another two poems having a similar subject: one by the Ploaghese poet Maria Baule about the attempted French invasion of the island in 1793, with the title "Ancora semus in gherra" ("We Are Still at War"), that was published by Giovanni Spano; the other one, always addressing the events of 1793, by the Gavoese poet Michele Carboni (1764–1814) titled "Ànimu, patriottas, a sa gherra!" ("Come On, Patriots, to War!").

== Performers ==
- Maria Teresa Cau
- Maria Carta
- Anna Loddo
- Peppino Marotto
- Gruppo Rubanu (Orgosolo)
- Tazenda and Andrea Parodi
- Piero Marras and Maria Giovanna Cherchi
- Kenze Neke
- Elena Ledda
- Cordas et Cannas, in Cantos e musicas de sa Sardigna (1983)
- Coro Supramonte
- Pino Masi
- Savina Yannatou
- Stefano Saletti, Piccola Banda Ikona, with Ambrogio Sparagna

== See also ==
- Music of Sardinia
- Sa die de sa Sardigna
- "S'hymnu sardu nationale"

== Bibliography ==
- Boullier, Auguste (1864). Essai sur le dialecte et les chants populaires de la Sardaigne (in French). Paris.
- Boullier, Auguste (1865). L'île de Sardaigne. Dialecte et chants populaires (in French). Paris.
  Italian edition: Garzia, Raffa, ed. (1916). I canti popolari della Sardegna. Bologna.
- Garzia, Raffa (1899). Il canto d'una rivoluzione (in Italian). Cagliari.
- Bianco, Pier Ausonio; Cheratzu, Francesco (1998). Su patriottu sardu a sos feudatarios (in Sardinian). Sassari: Condaghes. ISBN 978-88-86229-33-3.
- Mannu, Francesco Ignazio (2002). Carta, Luciano (ed.). Su patriotu sardu a sos feudatarios (in Sardinian). Cagliari.
- Tyndale, J. W. (1849). The Island of Sardinia including pictures of the manners and customs of the Sardinians, and notes on the antiquities and modern abjects of interest in the Island, in three volumes. Vol. III. London: T. Bentley.
