= Sa die de sa Sardigna =

Holiday in Sardinia, Italy

Sardinia's Day
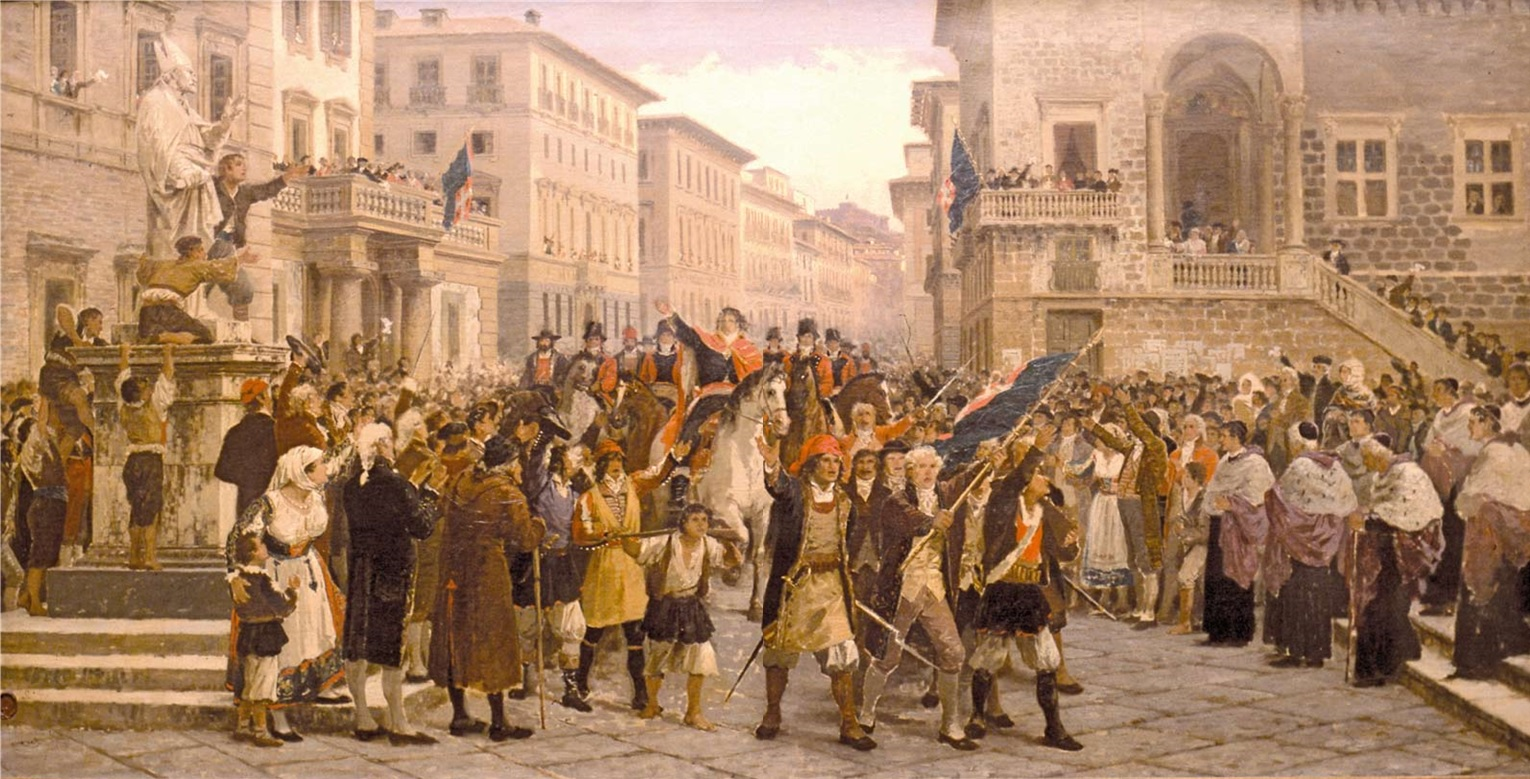
- G. Maria Angioy enters Sassari (1795)
- Official name: Sa die de sa Sardigna (Sardinian)
- Also called: Giornata del popolo sardo (Sardinian people's Day)
- Observed by: Sardinia, Italy
- Significance: Commemorates the Sardinian Vespers
- Date: April 28
- Frequency: annual

Sardinia's Day (sa die de sa Sardigna [sa ˈði.ɛ ðɛ za zaɾˈdiɲːa]; Sassarese: la dì di la Sardigna; Gallurese: la dì di la Saldigna; Algherese: lo dia de la Sardenya; Italian: il giorno della Sardegna), also known as the Sardinian People's Day (Italian: Giornata del popolo sardo), is a holiday in Sardinia commemorating the Sardinian Vespers, which occurred from 1794 to 1796.

== History ==
In the last decades of the 18th century following the Savoyard take-over of the island and the once Spanish Kingdom, tensions had begun to mount among the Sardinians towards the Piedmontese administration. Sardinian peasants resented the feudal rule and both the local nobles and the bourgeoisie were being left out of any active civil and military role, with the viceroy and other people from the Italian mainland being appointed in charge of the island. Such political unrest was bolstered further by the international situation, with particular regard to the ferment developing in other European regions (namely Ireland, Poland, Belgium, Hungary, Tyrol) and the episodes leading to the French Revolution.

In 1793, a French fleet tried to conquer the island along two lines of attack, the first one across the southern coast in Cagliari and the other in the nearby of the Maddalena archipelago. However, the locals managed to resist the invasion by the French, and began expecting the Savoyards to acknowledge the feat and improve their condition in return. The Sardinians thus presented with the King a list of grievances requiring his remedy, amongst which the demand that most of the offices be reserved for native Sardinians, along with autonomy from the Savoyard ruling class.

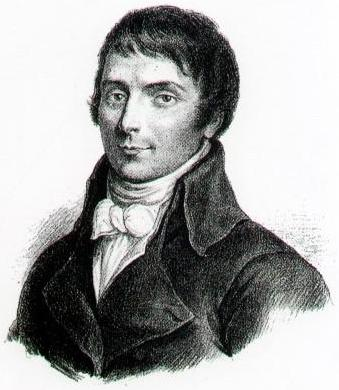
Portrait of G. Maria Angioy

== Insurrection ==
The King's peremptory refusal to grant the island any of these wishes eventually spurred the rebellion against Piedmont's primacy within the Kingdom, with the arrest of two notable figures of the so-called "Patriotic Party" (the lawyers from Cagliari Vincenzo Cabras and Efisio Pintor) being the final spark of unrest amongst the populace.

On 28 April 1794, known as sa dii de s'aciappa ("the day of the pursuit and capture"), people in Cagliari started chasing any Piedmontese functionaries they could find; since many of them started to wear the local robes in order to blend into the crowd, any people suspected to be from the Italian mainland would be asked by the populace to "say chickpea" (nara cixiri) in Sardinian: failure in pronouncing the word correctly would give their origin away. By May, all the 514 Savoyard officers were put on a boat and sent back to the mainland. Encouraged by what happened in Cagliari, the people in Sassari and Alghero did the same, and the revolt spread throughout the rest of the island in the countryside.

Thus, Sardinia became the first European country to have engaged in a revolution of its own, the episode not being the result of a foreign military importation like in most of Europe.

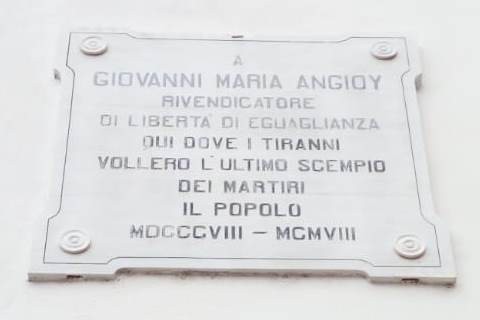
Commemorative plaque for G. M. Angioy in Sassari

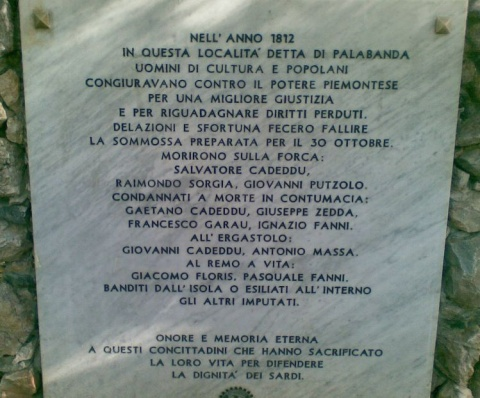
Plaque commemorating the 'Palabanda conspiracy' in Cagliari

== End ==
The uprising was then led for another two years by the republican Giovanni Maria Angioy, then a judge of the Royal Hearing (Reale Udienza), but it was later repressed by the loyalist forces that became bolstered by the peace treaty between France and Piedmont in 1796. The revolutionary experiment was thus brought to an end and Sardinia remained under Savoyard rule.

A period of restoration of the monarchical and aristocratic values would follow the Sardinian revolution, culminating in the Perfect Fusion between the island and the mainland; however, they did not manage to crack down on a couple of localized but significant antifeudal revolts that would arise, from time to time, up until 1821, like the so-called "Palabanda's Conspiracy" in Cagliari of 1812 and the rebellion in Alghero of 1821.

== Institutionalization of the date ==
The actual date was chosen in 1993 and public events are being annually held to commemorate the episode, while the schools are closed.

== See also ==
- Su patriottu sardu a sos feudatarios, official Sardinian hymn and a revolutionary anthem
- History of Sardinia
