= Giovanni Maria Angioy =

Sardinian politician (1751–1808)

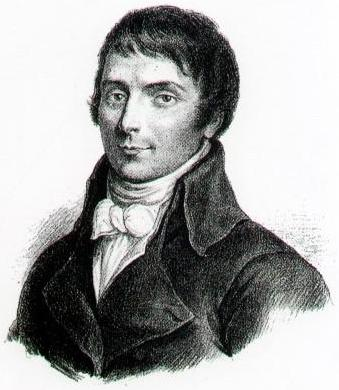
Juanne Maria Angioy

Notwithstanding the maladministration, the sparse population and all the impediments which stand in the way of agricultural, trade and industrial development, Sardinia is well provided with everything necessary for the nourishment and sustenance of its own inhabitants. If Sardinia, even in a state of neglect, without a government and industry of its own, and after all these centuries of misfortunes, has still so many resources, one may conclude that, if it were well managed, it would be one of the most prosperous states of Europe, and that the ancients were not wrong to paint it as a country renowned for its size, for its population, and for the copiousness of its manufacture.

— Memoirs, 1799

Giovanni Maria Angioy (pronounced [dʒoˈvanni maˈriːa anˈdʒɔi]; Sardinian: Juanne Maria Angioy [juˈanːɛ maˈɾi.a anˈdʒo.i]; 21 October 1751, Bono, Sardinia – 23 February 1808, Paris, France) was a Sardinian politician and patriot and is considered to be a national hero by Sardinian nationalists. Although best known for his political activities, Angioy was a university lecturer, a judge for the Reale Udienza, an entrepreneur and a banker.

From 1794 to 1796, Angioy contributed in shaping and guiding the mass revolt known as "Sardinian Vespers", which was fought to end the feudal privileges and laws that still existed on the island of Sardinia, and to declare the island to be a republic. In 1796, due to persecution by the ruling House of Savoy, he had to escape from Sardinia. Angioy found refuge in France, where he sought support for a French annexation of the island. He died, unsuccessful, in Paris at the age of fifty-six.

== Biography ==
=== Early years ===
His parents belonged to the Sardinian rural middle class of Bono. During his childhood both his parents died though, first his mother, at the young age of 30, and later his father.

A maternal uncle, Father Thaddeus Arras, took care of Angioy's education. His uncle Thaddeus was his first teacher, but he was also taught by the Fathers Mercedari, a monastic order. Later, Angioy was educated under the supervision of Canon Giovanni Antonio Arras in Sassari. Angioy continued his studies at the Jesuit fathers' school ("Canopoleno"), and at 21 years he had already become a university lecturer, in the law school at the University of Cagliari. Despite his young age he also became a deputy lawyer. Finally, at 39 he became a judge for the Reale Udienza (Sardinia's supreme court).

=== The ideas of the French Revolution ===
On the façade of the City Hall of Bono, Sardinia, an inscription says: "To Giovanni Maria Angioy, who inspired by the 1789 Revolution started the Sardinian crusade against the feudal yoke." The ideas of the French Revolution reached Sardinia and had an influence on many intellectuals, despite limited means of communication. Angioy had read many French texts, which were a catalyst for sparking his revolutionary views. The spread of the French revolutionary theories was also favored by the fact that Jean Paul Marat, one of the leading figures of the French Revolution had Sardinian ancestry.

=== Anti-Feudal revolts ===
Sardinia was at the time ruled by the House of Savoy. The House of Savoy was granted control of the Kingdom of Sardinia in 1718 with the Treaty of London that followed the War of the Spanish Succession: although assuming the role of King of Sardinia with this treaty, Victor Amadeus II of Savoy moved the capital of the Kingdom to Turin in mainland Italy where the parliament was also based: the parliament and government of the Kingdom was composed exclusively of men from the mainland. Similarly to other colonial domains, Sardinia was governed by a viceroy appointed by the king and only men from the mainland were appointed in the main roles of the Sardinian administration, excluding native Sardinians from any active role in government. After receiving the title of King of Sardinia Victor Amadeus II of Savoy sent his lieutenant, Baron de Saint-Rémy, to assume the role of viceroy of Sardinia.

The new viceroy asked the Sardinian parliament, the "Stamenti", to swear to observe the laws and privileges of the nobility that had been granted by the Spanish governments that ruled the Kingdom of Sardinia before the Savoy. The acceptance of long-standing laws and privileges by the Sardinian parliament also implied the continuation of the feudal system that had been introduced by the Spanish with the conquest of Sardinia in the 15th century. This was particularly controversial because in many other regions of Europe feudalism had disappeared well before the 18th century.

Feudalism had an extremely negative influence on the economy and social structure of Sardinia. It penalised the main economic activity in Sardinia, agriculture. At that time, in fact, the island was divided into fiefdoms and domains under the rule of the nobility. In these domains, taxes for farmers were very high, and annuities were due to the archbishops of Cagliari and Oristano, as well as those due to the major landowners like the Marquis Alagon of Villasor, the Marquis of Thiesi and many others. Only seven cities (Castelsardo, Sassari, Alghero, Bosa, Oristano, Iglesias and Cagliari) were exempted from paying feudal duties (a tradition established by the Spaniards, who granted these towns to be ruled directly by the King and not by the nobility).

As a consequence of the feudal system, which prevented economic mobility and entrepreneurship, town and cities were sparsely inhabited at the time, while most of the population lived in rural areas where they were hassled with harsh feudal taxation: farmers were paid a fifth of what other workers were paid. For vassals (farmers that worked the land of the landowner), taxes were innumerable: every head of the family, in addition to other charges, was to pay a fine.

After the French Revolution, French armies moved war to different countries in Europe, trying to spread their revolutionary ideas. In 1793, a French fleet carrying soldiers moved toward the Gulf of Cagliari. The French wanted to conquer Sardinia in order to use it as a base for attacks on mainland Italy. After bombarding Cagliari from the sea, the French divisions landed on the beach at Quartu, near Cagliari, and from there, moved toward the town on foot. Most of the troops of the House of Savoy were involved in other wars against the French on the mainland of Europe, so the Sardinians organised their own defence against the invading French divisions. Eventually the French were defeated both on land and at sea.

In 1793, following this failed French invasion of Sardinia, local insurgents urged relief from feudal law and excessive aristocratic control. In response, the Sardinian nobility met in their Sardinian parliament, the Stamenti, and issued five requests to the King Victor Amadeus III of Sardinia to make five changes in the law to bring Sardinia more in line with the freedoms enjoyed by those in Piedmont. Known as the "five requests". These requests were:

- The re-introduction of an assembly of Sardinians (Corti Generali) to meet every ten years (the House of Savoy rulers had not summoned this assembly since 1720, infringing a practice that was taken for granted during the Spanish dominion);
- Ratification of the privileges, laws and customs of Sardinia;
- They asked all public offices in Sardinia to be given to native Sardinians;
- The establishment of a Ministry of Sardinian Affairs in the kingdom's capital of Turin (although the Kingdom was Sardinian by name, the House of Savoy ruled from the territories they held in mainland Italy and had made Turin, in Piedmont, the capital of the kingdom);
- Establishment of a Council of State, with the role of giving advice and guidance to the King in important decisions for the Kingdom.

These requests were moderate concessions that the Sardinian nobility thought they deserved for demonstrating loyalty to the House of Savoy. As it can be seen, the requests were hardly revolutionary and only aimed at giving a more active role to the Sardinian nobility in the administration of the region. Nonetheless, the House of Savoy rejected all of these requests. Because of the requests, the Savoyard ruling class distrusted the Sardinia nobles and had commenced persecution of the most prominent Sardinians that had participated in the Stamenti. This, in turn, created increasing discontent in the Sardinians from all classes, not only in the nobility, which mounted into open hostility when the authorities tried to arrest two Sardinians. One of these Sardinians managed to escape and the anger at his persecution sparked an open revolt by the population of Cagliari on 28 April 1794.

During this revolt, the mob chased and killed The General Intendant Jerome Pitzolo (6 July) and the General Gavino Paliaccio, Marquis of Planargia (22 July). These were the days of "s'acciappa" ("the chase") referring to the fact that all Piedmontese were hunted and chased across the city. Eventually, all 514 Piedmontese and Italian officials were rounded up, including Viceroy Balbiano Vincent, and expelled from Cagliari on a boat. The example was followed by other cities and the revolt spread throughout Sardinia. The island was governed by a provisional Royal Audience during this revolutionary period. Since the year 1997 the rebellion of 28 April has been celebrated in Cagliari as "Sardinia Day" ("Sa die de sa Sardigna" in Sardinian).

== The Post of "Alternos" ==
The House of Savoy tried to regain control of Sardinia on the same year. A new viceroy, Filippo Vivalda of Castellino, was installed and landed in Cagliari on 6 September, but the revolts and riots continued. Trying to use the unrest to their profit, the nobility from the north-east of Sardinia (Logudoro and Sassari), asked the king greater autonomy from the viceroy and to depend directly by the Crown.

These requests, which somehow broke the unity of the revolt, angered the revolutionaries in Cagliari and in the rest of Sardinia. The revolutionaries thus organised further uprisings against the nobility in Sassari, uprisings that were particularly popular with farmers and shepherds of the northern part of Sardinia, the Logudoro, where feudal rights and laws were not clearly defined and the landowners used this uncertainty to apply extortionate payments from the vassals. The uprising in the Logudoro climaxed on 28 December 1795, when a great mass of rebels from all over Logudoro marched toward Sassari singing the famous song of Francis Ignatius Mannu: "procurad'è moderade, Barones sa tirrannia" (in Sardinian: mitigate your tyranny, you landowners and nobles). The city was occupied by the revolutionaries, led by Gioachino Mundula and Francesco Cillocco. Having taken as prisoners the governor of Sassari and the archbishop, the rebels marched towards Cagliari.

On 13 February 1796, in order to stop the riots, the viceroy Philip Vivalda along with representatives of the Stamenti, decided to send Giovanni Maria Angioy to Sassari. Angioy was then a judge of the Reale Udienza, but in order to try calm the revolt he was given the role of "Alternos", which allowed him to act as viceroy (and he was supposed to work in conjunction with the viceroy).

Having taken the role of Alternos, Angioy departed from Cagliari to the inner part of Sardinia. During the trip, he won over many Sardinians from different classes. He also had a chance to realise the actual conditions of the Sardinian economy and society: agriculture was still archaic and underdeveloped with little innovation. The feudal oppression contributed highly to the hardship of farmers and the deep poverty of the villagers. Angioy was thus developing revolutionary and democratic ideas that he had nurtured by reading many French political and philosophical texts (he was fluent in French as well as Italian and Sardinian).

When Angioy arrived in Sassari, he was greeted as a liberator. Many saw in him the person that could help deliver the economic and political change that Sardinia highly needed. After placating the revolt in Sassari and Logudoro, Angioy demanded the viceroy to free the villages and lands from the feudal system. He also refused to collect feudal taxes, as he was required to do by the viceroy. Furthermore, he angered the viceroy even more by expressing his critical views of the feudal system and Savoyard rule. With his powers, he tried to establish some reform by promulgating laws to promote collaboration between landowners and farmers, but his efforts were systemically boycotted by both the viceroy and the nobility in Cagliari.

It might seem strange that the same Sardinian nobility who contributed to starting the revolution, was so adverse to the reforms that Angioy was trying to implement; however, it must be taken into account that the goal of the Sardinian nobility was only to increase their standing in the administration of Sardinia and certainly not to start a radical revolution and change the status quo. As a matter of fact, the Sardinian nobility was deeply worried that the revolt had gotten out of their hands.

Because of the difficulties in legally implementing any kind of reform, the support Angioy enjoyed was fading little by little: some of his collaborators deserted him, while the popular revolt that Angioy hoped could topple the status-quo in Sardinia, never took place because significant portions of the population were suspicious of revolutionary ideas akin to those of the French Revolution. The majority of the population was certainly not eager to maintain the feudal system and the rule of the nobility, but many thought the revolutionary ideas that Angioy expressed were too radical and were deeply suspicious of reforms that would have changed radically the social structure of the villages.

To succeed in his plans of reform, Angioy secretly made some agreements with France: France were ready to support him in trying to stage a revolt to topple the House of Savoy and the viceroy. Angioy's goal was to proclaim a Sardinian Republic, although it is not clear from his memoirs whether he was planning to create an independent state with French protection or whether France was supposed to take a more active role in administering the new republic.

However, when in 1795 France signed in Cherasco a peace deal with the Savoy king, Vittorio Amedeo III, any plan of supporting a Sardinian revolt led by Angioy was abandoned. Angioy then faced persecution by the House of Savoy: he was stripped of his Alternos role and an arrest warrant was issued on him as well as a reward for whoever helped capture or kill him. Angioy managed to escape arrest and organised an army to carry out his plans of revolt even without any external support. However, on 8 June 1796 he was defeated near Oristano, and his army disintegrated. Angioy fled Sardinia and took a boat with the goal of going to Genoa. Apparently his plan was to go to the capital Turin and still try negotiating some measure to abolish the feudal rule in Sardinia. However, as he realised that his efforts were doomed and his own liberty and life were in danger, he fled to France. He lived in France until his death in Paris in 1808, aged 56.

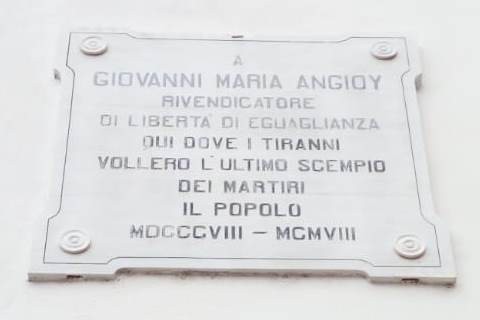
Plaque on the wall in Sassari commemorating Giovanni Maria Angioy's revolutionary zeal in supporting liberty and equality for the island's people.

== See also ==
- Su patriotu sardu a sos feudatarios, revolutionary Sardinian anthem
- Sa die de sa Sardigna
