= S'hymnu sardu nationale =

Anthem of Sardinia during Savoyard rule

English: The Sardinian National Anthem
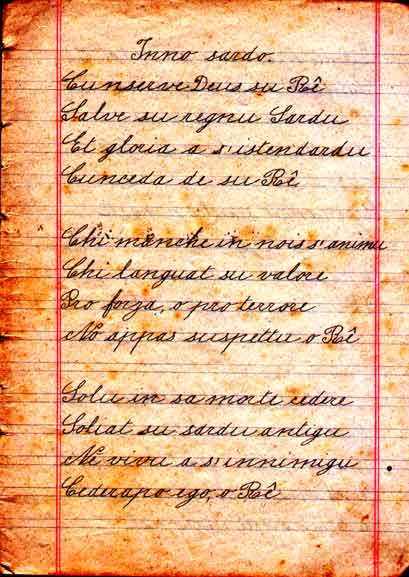
- First page from a handwritten copy of the lyrics
- National anthem of the Kingdom of Sardinia; National anthem of the Kingdom of Italy
- Also known as: Cunservet Deus su Re (English: God Save the King)
- Lyrics: Vittorio Angius
- Music: Giovanni Gonella
- Adopted: 1830s
- Relinquished: 1861 (de facto); 1946 (de jure)

"S'hymnu sardu nationale" ("The Sardinian National Anthem"), also known by its incipit as "Cunservet Deus su Re" ("God Save the King"), was the national anthem of the Kingdom of Sardinia under Savoyard rule and of the Kingdom of Italy.

== History ==
Dating back to the 1830s, the anthem was written in the Logudorese dialect of Sardinian by the Sardinian priest Vittorio Angius, who became secular in 1842. The music was composed by a maestro from Sassari, Giovanni Gonella (1804–1854), who was also the musician of the Brigata Regina. The anthem was first performed at the Cagliari Civic Theatre on 20 February 1844.

The original score was found in the archives of the Music Auditorium in Cagliari by Prof. Francesco Cesare Casula, then head of Institute of History of Mediterranean Europe (ISEM) of Italy's National Research Council (CNR). According to Casula, the official hymn was held in high regard by the rulers from the Italian mainland in Piedmont. On the express wishes of Victor Emmanuel III of Italy, it was officially performed for the last time in 1937, by the choir of the Sistine Chapel, the Director of which being Lorenzo Perosi, when the Golden Rose was conferred to Queen Elena by Pope Pius XI.

The anthem was de facto replaced by the Italian Royal March of Ordinance ("Marcia Reale") as early as 1861, but it would lose its formal status only in 1946, when the monarchy was definitely abolished and "Il Canto degli Italiani" ("The Chant of Italians") was chosen as the provisional national anthem of the newly proclaimed Italian Republic.

In 1991, "S'Hymnu sardu nationale" was performed by the Carabinieri Music Band at the Quirinal Palace on 29 May, in accordance with the traditional way the foreign diplomatic corps was received. It was meant to pay homage to the Sardinian origin of Francesco Cossiga, then President of the Republic. It was played again when Cossiga resigned from such position on 28 April 1992.

In 2001, the anthem was performed on the occasion of the funeral of Marie José of Belgium, the last queen of Italy.

== Lyrics ==
The anthem is entirely written in Sardinian language, and more specifically the Logudorese dialect.

Cunservet Deus su Re

Salvet su Regnu Sardu
Et gloria a s'istendardu
Cuncedat de su Re!

chi manchet in nois s'animu
chi languat su valore
Pro fortza o pro terrore
Non apas suspetu, o Re.

Cunservet Deus su Re...

Unu o omni chentu intrepidos
A ferru et a mitralia
In vallu e in muralia
amus a andare o Re.

Cunservet Deus su Re...

Solu in sa morte cedere
Soliat su Sardu antigu
Né vivu a' s'inimigu
deo m'apa a dare, o Re.

Cunservet Deus su Re...

De fidos et fort'omines
Si fizos nos bantamus
Bene nos provaramus
Fizos issoro, o Re.

Cunservet Deus su Re...

De ti mostrare cupidu
Sa fide sua, s'amore
Sas venas in ardore
Sentit su Sardu, o Re.

Cunservet Deus su Re...

Indica un adversariu
E horrenda dae su coro
Scoppiat s'ira insoro
A unu tou cinnu, o Re.

Cunservet Deus su Re...

Cumanda su chi piagat
Si bene troppu duru,
E nde sias tue seguru
chi at a esser fatu, o Re.

Cunservet Deus su Re...

Sa forza qui mirabile
Là fuit a' su Romanu
E innanti a s'Africanu
Tue bideras, o Re.

Cunservet Deus su Re...

Sa forza qui tant'atteros
Podesit superare
Facherat operare
Unu tuo cinnu, o Re.

Cunservet Deus su Re...

Sos fidos fortes homines
Abbaida tue contentu
chi an a esse in onzi eventu
cales jà fuint, o Re.

Cunservet Deus su Re
Salvet su Regnu Sardu
Et gloria a s'istendardu
Concedat de su Re!

== See also ==
- "Su patriottu sardu a sos feudatarios", an antifeudal song, now the official anthem of Sardinia
