= History of Sardinia =

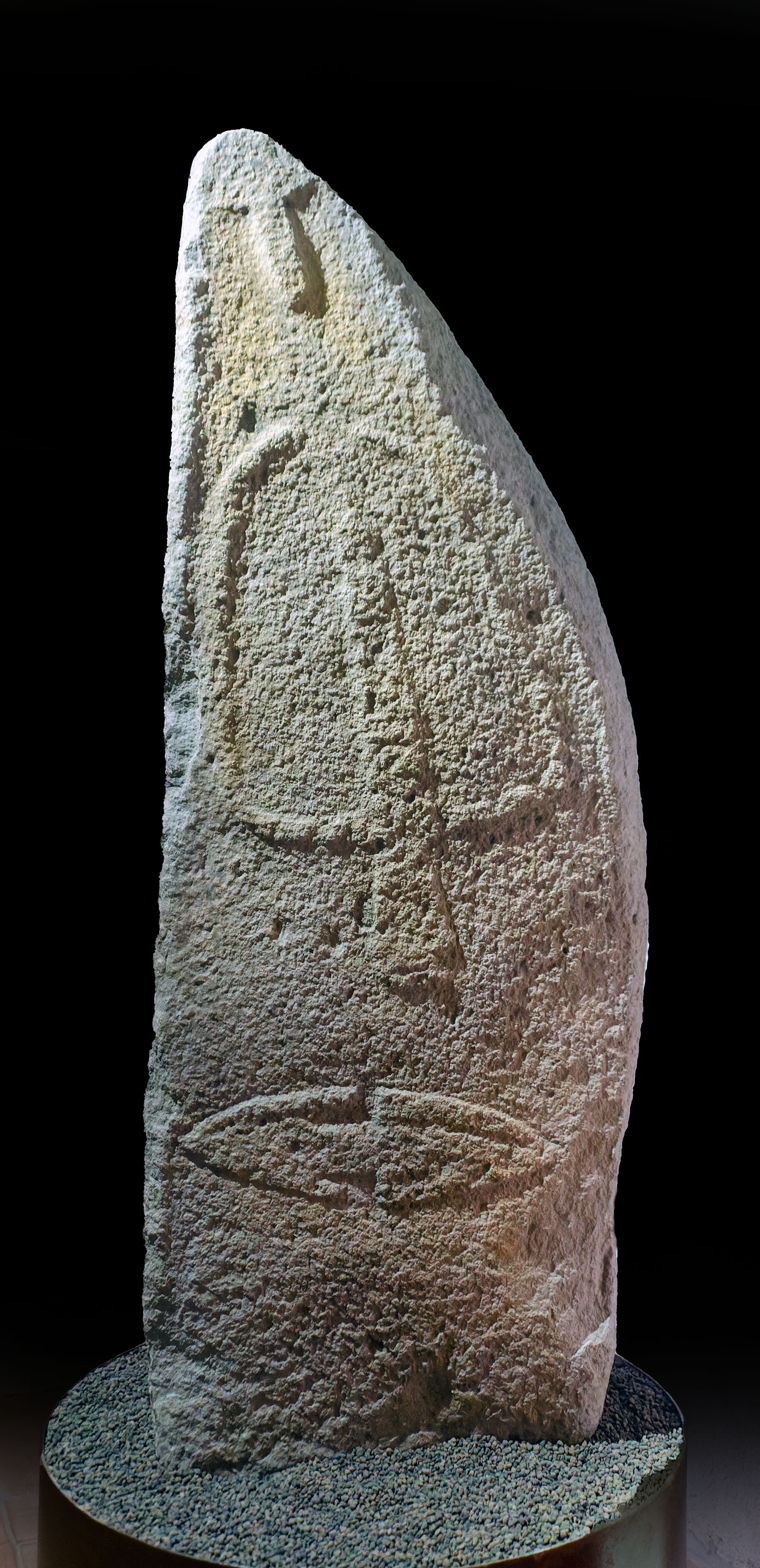
Statue menhir from Laconi

Archaeological evidence of prehistoric human settlement on the island of Sardinia is present in the form of nuraghes and other prehistoric monuments, which dot the land. The recorded history of Sardinia begins with its contacts with the various people who sought to dominate western Mediterranean trade in classical antiquity: Phoenicians, Punics and Romans. Initially under the political and economic alliance with the Phoenician cities, it was partly conquered by Carthage in the late 6th century BC and then entirely by Rome after the First Punic War (230 BC). The island was included for centuries in the Roman province of Sardinia and Corsica, which would be incorporated into the diocese of Italia suburbicaria in 3rd and 7th centuries.

In the Early Middle Ages, through the European barbarian movements, the waning of the Byzantine Empire influence in the western Mediterranean and the Saracen raids, the island fell out of the sphere of influence of any higher government; this led to the birth of four independent kingdoms called Judicates (Latin: Judicati; Sardinian: Judicados) in the 8th through 10th centuries. Falling under papal influence, Sardinia became the focus of the rivalry of Genoa, Pisa, and the Crown of Aragon, which eventually subsumed the island as the Kingdom of Sardinia in 1324. The Iberian Kingdom was to last until 1718, when it was ceded to the House of Savoy; from Piedmont, the Savoyards pursued a policy of expansion to the rest of the Italian peninsula, having their Kingdom of Sardinia be later renamed into "Kingdom of Italy" in 1861.

== Prehistory ==
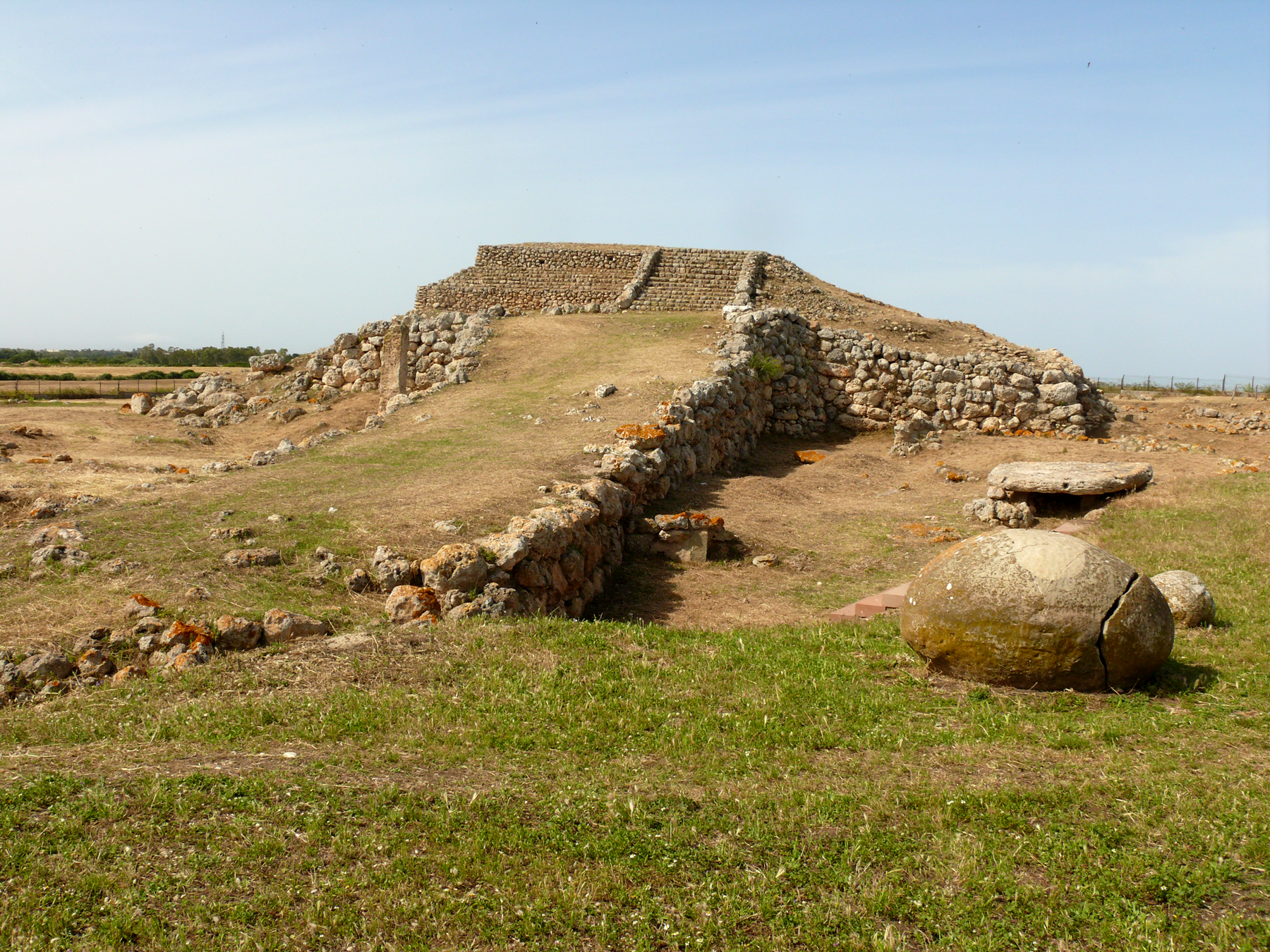
Prehistoric temple of Monte d'Accoddi, one of the oldest buildings in the world.

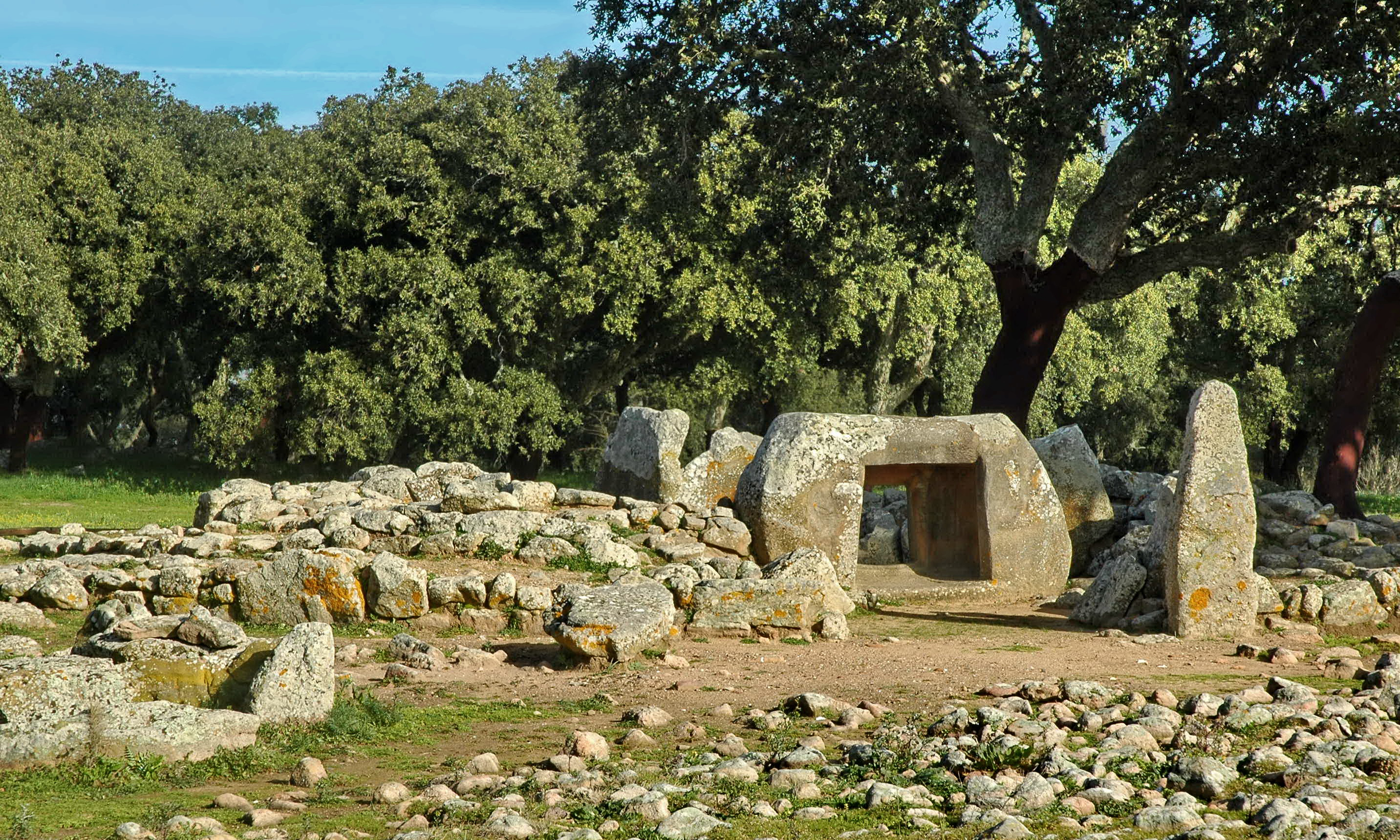
Necropolis of Pranu Mutteddu, Goni

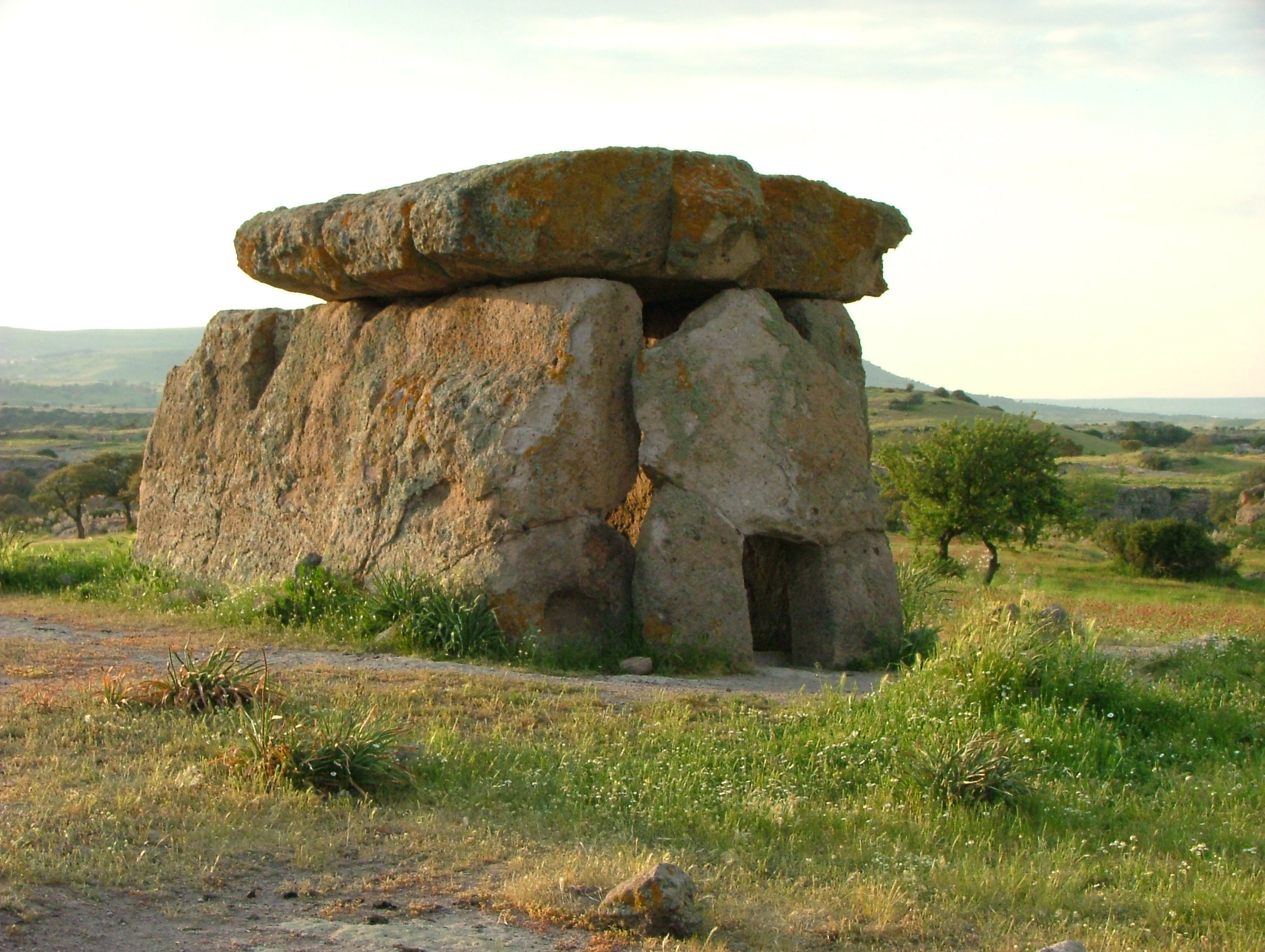
Dolmen of Mores dated to the 3rd millennium BC

The oldest trace in Sardinia of the anthropomorphic prehistoric primate called Oreopithecus bambolii is dated to 8.5 million years ago. In 1996 a hominid finger bone, dated up to 250,000 BC, was found in a cave in the Logudoro region. Modern humans appeared in the island during the Upper Paleolithic; a phalanx dated to 18,000 BC has been found in the Corbeddu cave, near Oliena. Mesolithic human remains have been discovered in the Su Coloru cave of Laerru but also in the south (Sirri, Arbus).

Already in the Stone Age, Monte Arci played an important role. The old volcano was one of the central places where obsidian was found and worked for cutting tools and arrowheads. Even now the volcanic glass can be found on the sides of the mountain.

The Neolithic began in Sardinia in the 6th millennium BC with the Cardial culture. Later, important cultures like the Ozieri culture and the Arzachena culture of the late Neolithic and the Abealzu-Filigosa and Monte Claro culture of the Chalcolithic period, developed in the island contemporaneously with the appearance of the megalithic phenomenon.

The dolmen culture, around the end of the 3rd millennium BC, passed with other typical material aspects of Western Europe (e.g. Bell Beaker) through by the Sardinian coast even in Sicily.

Prehistoric and pre-Nuragic monuments and constructions that characterise the Sardinian landscapes are the Domus de Janas (literally, 'house of the fairies' or 'house of the witches' in Sardinian), the menhir and Statue menhir and the dolmens.

=== Chronology of pre-Nuragic Sardinia ===
Archeological cultures of Sardinia in the pre-Nuragic period:

Archaeological culture	Years BC
Cardium pottery or Filiestru culture	6000–4000
Bonu Ighinu culture	4000–3400
San Ciriaco culture	3400–3200
Ozieri culture	3200–2700
Abealzu-Filigosa culture	2700–2400
Monte Claro culture	2400–2100
Bell Beaker culture	2100–1800
Bonnanaro culture (A phase)	1800–1600

=== Nuragic period ===
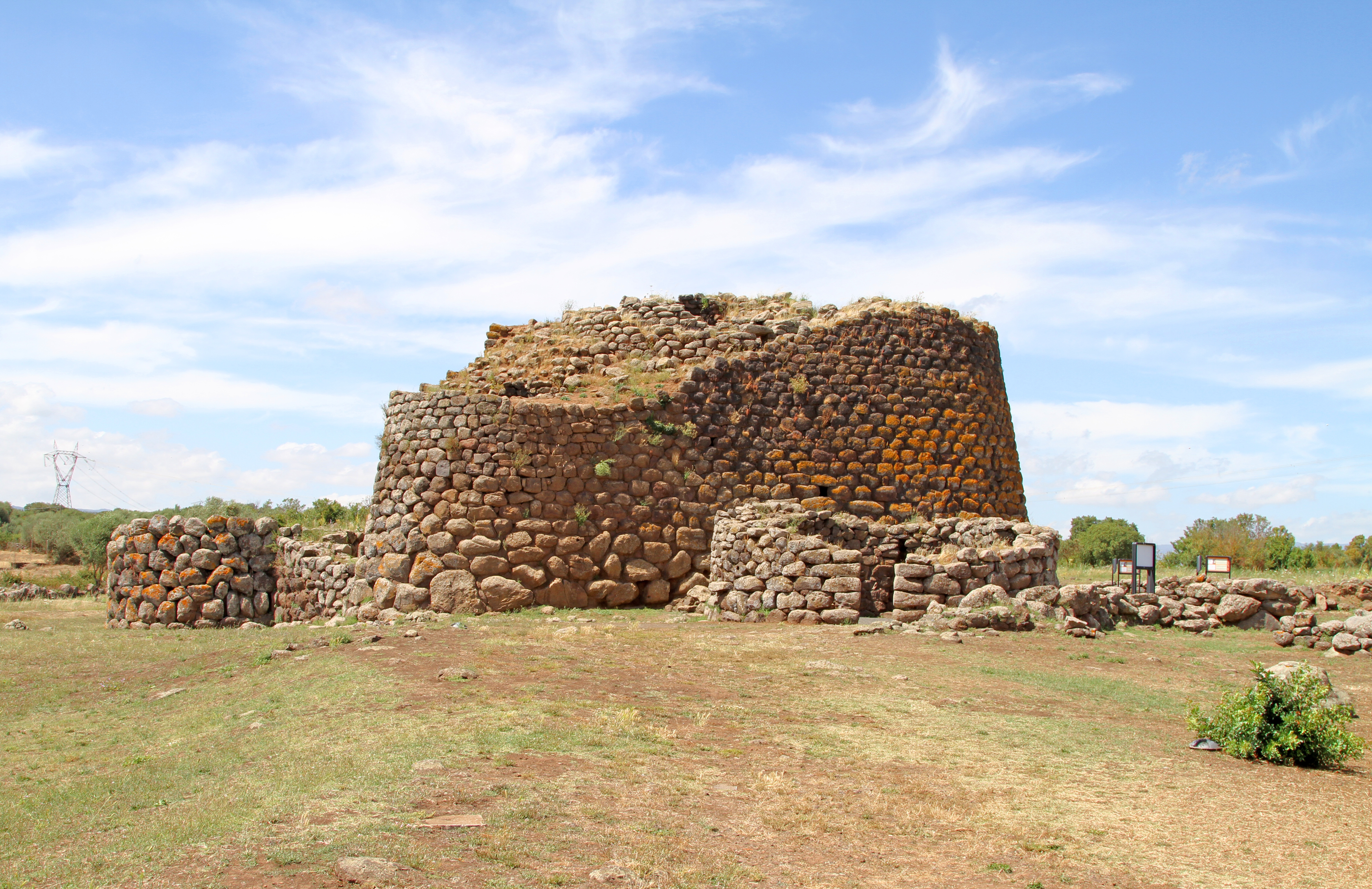
Nuraghe Losa, Abbasanta

Bronze Age Sardinia is characterised by stone structures called nuraghes, of which there are more than 8,000. The most famous is the complex of Barumini in the province of Medio Campidano. The nuraghes were mainly built in the period from about 1800 to 1200 BC, though many were used until the Roman period. Characteristics of this period are also the holy well temples (for example Santa Cristina, Paulilatino), the megara temples and the Giants' graves.

The Nuragic Sards also produced a vast collection of bronze statuettes and the so-called giants of Mont'e Prama, which might constitute the first anthropomorphic statues of Europe.

It is known that the Sardinians had contact with the Myceneans, who traded with the western Mediterranean. Contact with powerful cities of Crete, such as Kydonia, is clear from pottery recovered in archaeological excavations in Sardinia. The alleged connection with the Sherden, one of the sea peoples who invaded Egypt and other areas of eastern Mediterranean, has been supported by scholars like the professor Giovanni Ugas from the University of Cagliari; this hypothesis has been however opposed by other archaeologists and historians.

The name of the island may derive from Sardus (known amongst the Romans as Sardus Pater), a mythological hero of the Nuragic pantheon.

== Early and classical antiquity ==
=== Phoenician settlement ===
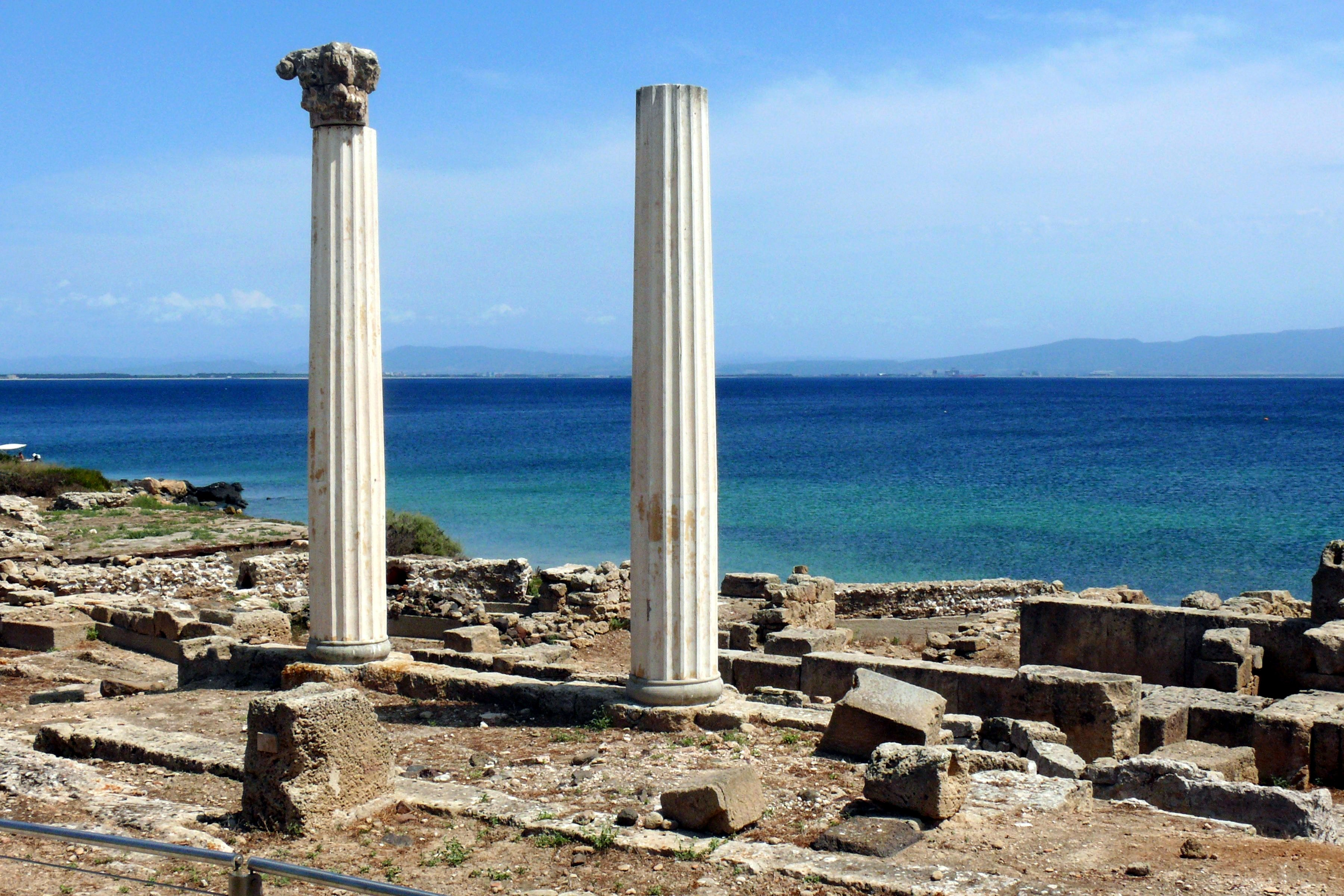
Ruins of the Phoenician and then Punic and Roman town of Tharros

From the 8th century BC, Phoenicians founded several cities and strongholds on strategic points in the south and west of Sardinia, often peninsulas or islands near estuaries, easy to defend and natural harbours, such as Tharros, Bithia, Sulci, Nora and Caralis (Cagliari). The majority of the inhabitants in these cities were of indigenous nuragic stock while the Phoenician element was, although culturally predominant, in minority. The Phoenicians came originally from what is now Lebanon and founded a vast trading network in the Mediterranean. Sardinia had a special position because it was central in the Western Mediterranean between Carthage, Spain, the river Rhône and the Etruscan civilization area. The mining area of the Iglesiente was important for the metals lead and zinc. After the Phoenicians, the Carthaginians took over control in this part of the Mediterranean, around 510 BC, after which a first attempt of conquest of the island in 540 BC ended in failure. They expanded their influence to the western and southern coast from Bosa to Caralis, consolidating the existing Phoenician colonies, administered by plenipotentiaries called Suffetes, and founding new ones such as Olbia, Cornus and Neapolis; Tharros probably became the capital of the province. Carthage stressed the growing of grain and cereals and prohibited fruit trees.

Tharros, Nora, Bithia, Monte Sirai etc. are now important archaeological monuments where architecture and city planning can be studied.

=== Roman Republic and Empire ===
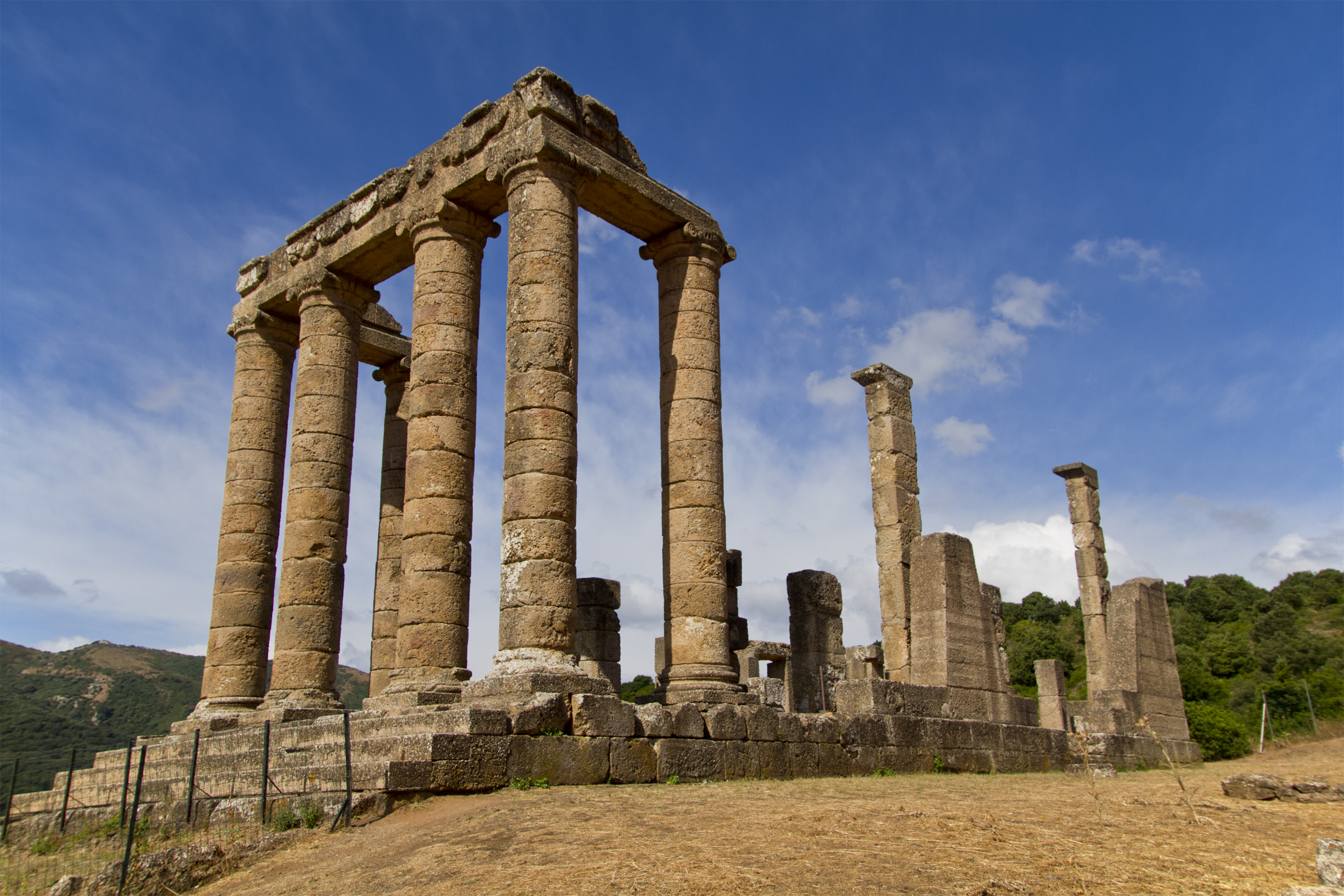
Antas Temple near Fluminimaggiore

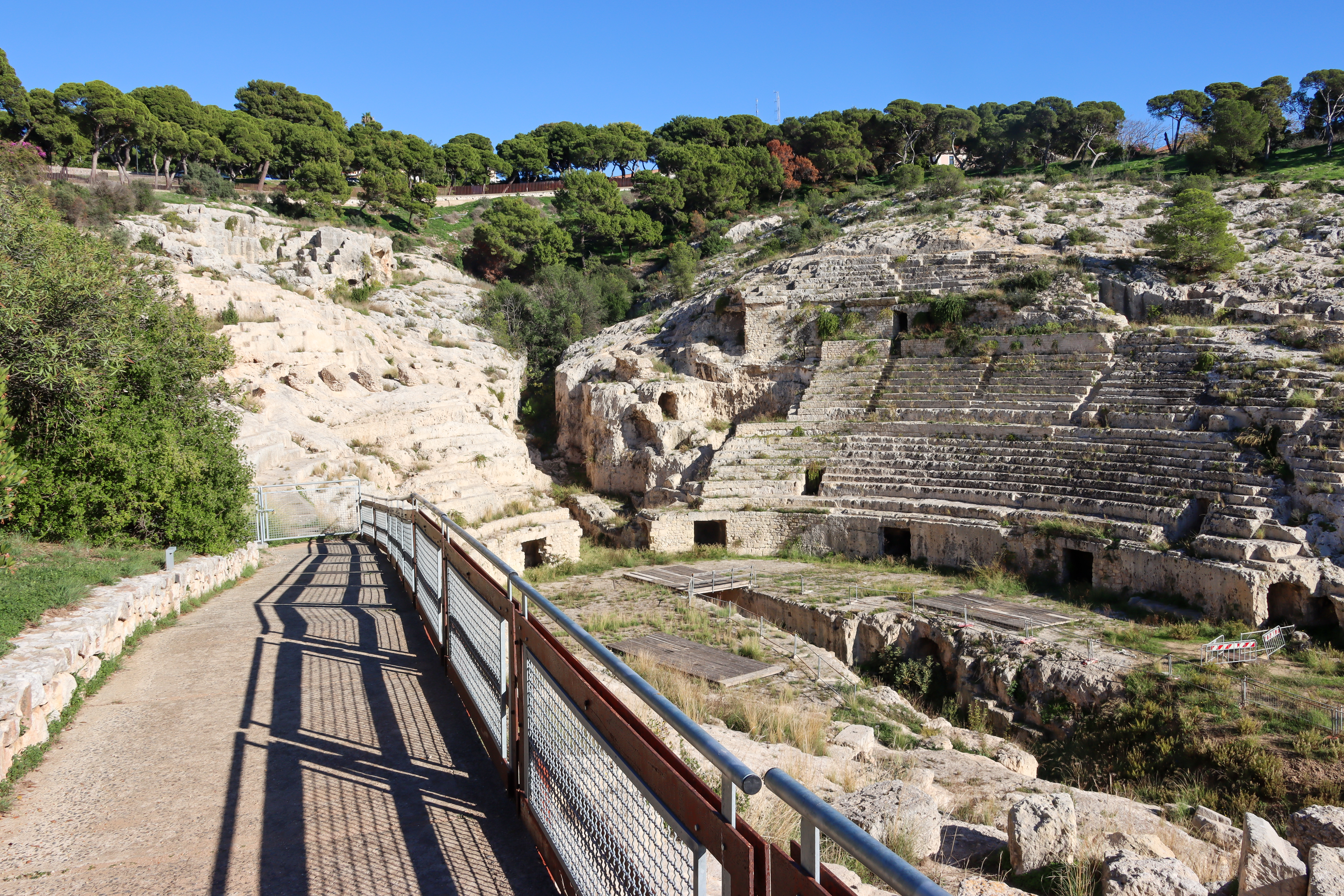
Ruins of the Roman amphitheatre of Cagliari

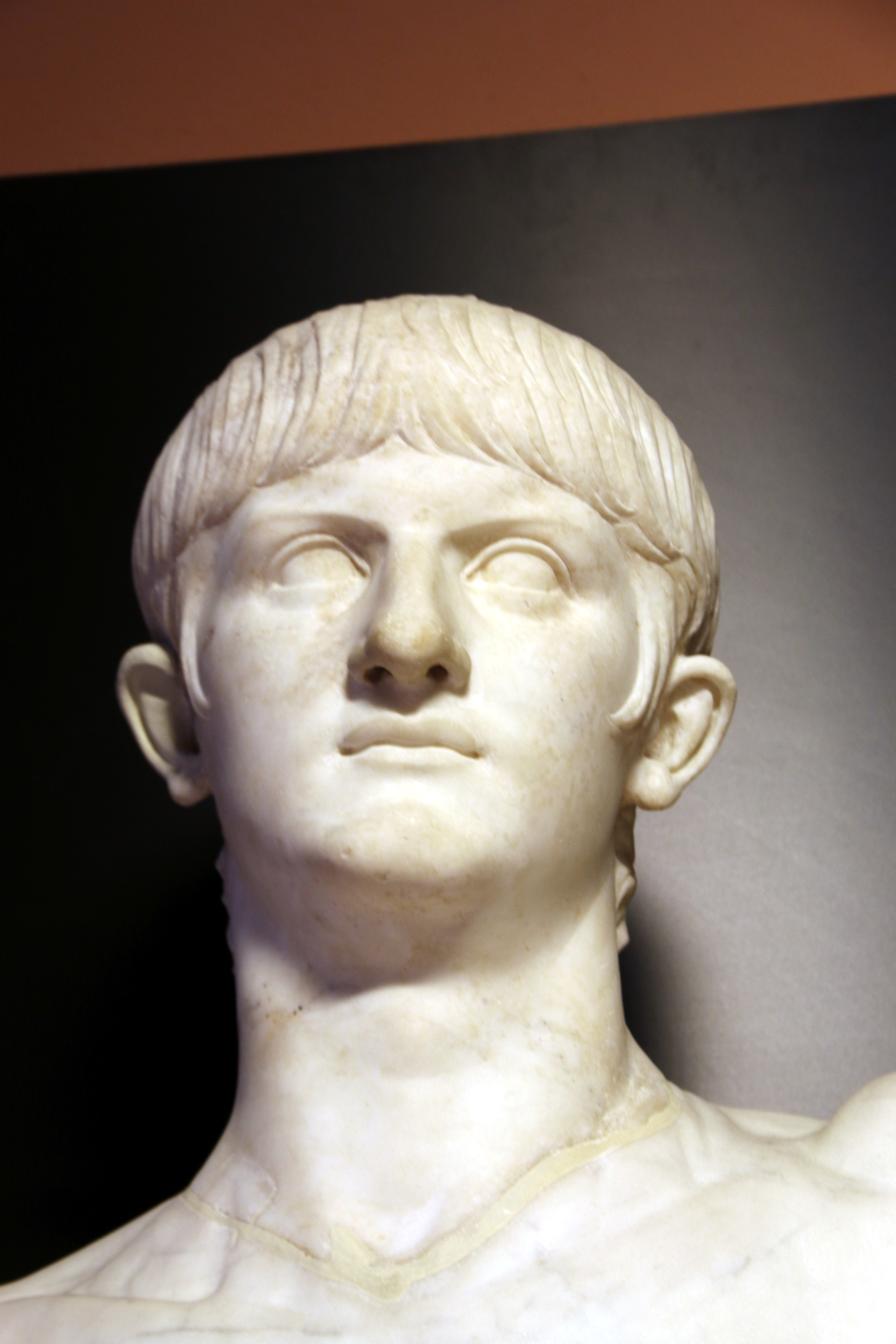
Marble bust of Nero from Olbia, Museo archeologico nazionale (Cagliari)

In 240 BC, in the course of the First Punic War, the Carthaginian mercenaries on the island revolted and gave the Romans, who some years earlier had defeated the Carthaginians in the naval battle of Sulci, the opportunity to land on Sardinia and occupy it. In 238 BC the Romans took over the whole island, without meeting any resistance. They took over an existing developed infrastructure and urbanized culture (at least in the plains). Along with Corsica it formed the province of Corsica et Sardinia, under a praetor. Together with Sicily it formed one of the main granaries of Rome until the Romans conquered Egypt in the 1st century BC.

A revolt, led by two Sardo-Punic notables from Cornus and Tharros, Hampsicora and Hanno, broke out after the crushing Roman defeat at Cannae (216 BC). A Roman army of 22,000 infantrymen and 1,200 cavalry, under Titus Manlius Torquatus, reached Sardinia landing in Caralis and defeating Hiostus, the son of Hampsicora, near Milis. The Romans then met the Carthaginian-Sardinian allied forces in the south of the island, defeating them in a pitched battle that took place between Sestu and Decimomannu, and killing 12,000 men. Another major revolt took place in 177–176 BC when the Balares and the Ilienses were defeated by Tiberius Gracchus, who, according to Livy, killed or enslaved about 80,000 natives. The last organized revolts were repressed by Marcus Caecilius Metellus in 115–111 BC and Titus Albucius in 106. However the Sardinians living in the impervious mountains of the interior resisted the Roman colonization well into Imperial times.

Punic culture remained strong during the first centuries of the Roman domination. However, in the long run, Romanization prevailed, and Latin became the speech of the majority of the inhabitants, ultimately developing into the modern Sardinian language. The Roman religion began to spread among Sardinians as well. Caralis, the provincial capital, Nora and Sulci obtained the status of Municipium within the 1st century AD and a Roman colony named Turris Libissonis (Porto Torres) was founded in the north-west while the village of Usellus become perhaps a Roman colony under Trajan. Four great roads were built: two along the coasts and two in the interior connecting all the major cities.

During the Roman period, the geographer Ptolemy noted that Sardinia was inhabited by the following tribes, from north to south: the Tibulati and the Corsi, the Coracenses, the Carenses and the Cunusitani, the Salcitani and the Lucuidonenses, the Æsaronenses, the Æchilenenses (also called Cornenses), the Rucensi, the Celsitani and the Corpicenses, the Scapitani and the Siculensi, the Neapolitani and the Valentini, the Solcitani and the Noritani.

In the year 212 AD, every inhabitant of the empire became a Roman citizen by the Constitutio Antoniniana, better known as the "Edict of Caracalla". At that time, many islanders from the Municipia and Coloniae were Roman citizens, while those living in the interior were not. Around the year 286 AD, Sardinia was incorporated into the Italian diocese during the empire of Diocletianus, and in 324 AD, under the rule of the emperor Constantine the Great, in the suburbicaria Italian diocese, until the conquest by the Vandals in 456 AD.

== Middle Ages ==
=== Vandals, Goths and Byzantines ===
After the fall of the Western Roman Empire, Sardinia was subject to several conquests. In 456, the Vandals, an East Germanic tribe, coming from North Africa, occupied the coastal cities of the island; they imposed garrisons guarded by African auxiliaries, like the Mauri. The Vandals followed Arianism and deported a number of African Bishops in the island such as Fulgentius of Ruspe. In 533, Sardinia rebelled under the Vandal governor Godas, a Goth, who proclaimed himself rex of Sardinia, asking the Byzantines for aid.

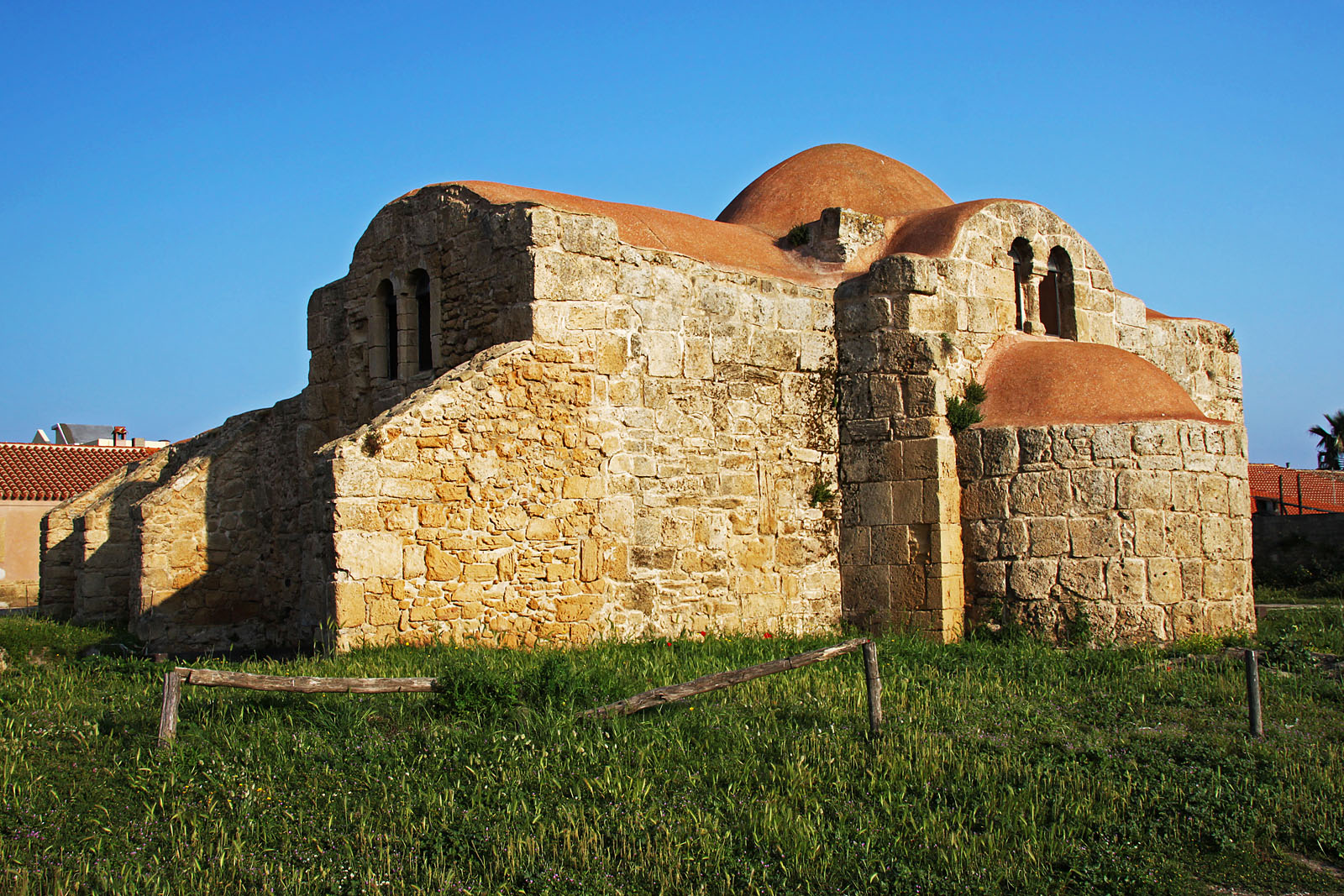
Byzantine era church of San Giovanni di Sinis

In the summer of 533 Vandal forces (5,000 men and 120 ships), led by Tzazo, arrived in Sardinia to stifle Godas' rebellion and conquered Caralis, killing Godas and his followers. In early 534, the Vandals of Sardinia surrendered immediately to the Byzantines when faced with news of the Vandal collapse in Africa; thenceforth the island was part of the Byzantine Empire, included as a province in the Praetorian prefecture of Africa. The local governor sat in Caralis. During the Gothic Wars, much of the island fell easily to the Ostrogoths, but the final fall of the Germanic resistance in mainland Italy reassured Byzantine control. Sardinia was subsequently included in the Exarchate of Africa until its end by the Arabs in 698 AD, when the island was likely aggregated to the Exarchate of Ravenna. In 599 and during the 7th century, the Longobard fleet tried to attack Caralis and Turris Libissonis (Porto Torres), but in vain.

One of the few ethnic Sardinians known from this period was Ospitone, a leader of the Barbaricinos (people of Barbagia). According to the Pope Gregory I's letters, a Romanized and Christianized area existed on the island (that of the provinciales) that co-existed with, in the interior, pagan or semi-pagan cultures (Gens Barbaricina). The ruler of one of the latter, Ospitone, converted to Christianity in 594 after a diplomatic exchange. Christianization however remained long influenced by eastern and Byzantine culture. Other known religious figures of Sardinian origin of that period (5th–6th centuries) are Pope Hilarius and Pope Symmachus.

=== Iberian invasions ===
Starting from the 8th century, the Iberians from Denia and Zaragoza (recently conquered by Muslims) harassed the population of the coastal cities. Details about the political situation of Sardinia in the following centuries are scarce. Due to Saracen attacks, in the 9th century Tharros was abandoned in favor of Oristano, after more than 1,800 years of human occupation while Caralis was abandoned in favor of Santa Igia; numerous other coastal centres suffered the same fate (Nora, Sulci, Bithia, Cornus, Bosa, Olbia etc.). There was another Denia invasion in 1015−16 from Balearics, led by Mujāhid al-ʿĀmirī (Latinized as Museto), the Denians attempt of invasion of the island was stopped by Sardinian Judicates with the support of the Fleets of the Maritime Republics of Pisa and Genoa, called by Pope Benedict VIII.

The main four Judicates.

=== Judicates (Judicados) ===
From the mid-11th century the Judicates ("held by judges") appeared. The title of Judex (judge, judike in medieval Sardinian) was an heir of that of the Byzantine governor after the creation of the Exarchate of Africa in 582 (Prases or Judex Provinciae). In the 8th and 9th centuries the four partes depending from Caralis grew increasingly independent, after that Byzantium was mostly cut off from the Tyrrhenian Sea by the Muslim conquest of Sicily in 827. A letter from Pope Nicholas I in 864 mentions for the first time the Sardinian judge, and their autonomy is clear in a later letter by Pope John VIII, which defined them as "Princes". A letter by Mieszko I to Pope John XV proves that the Judicates were known even in Poland, and that they played a prestigious role in medieval Europe.

During the judicial era Sardinia had some 300.000 inhabitants, of which slightly more than 1/3 were free. These were subjected to the authority of local curators (administrators), in turn subjected to the judge (who also administered justice and was the commander of the army). The church was also powerful, and at this time it had completely abandoned the Eastern Rite. The late 11th-century arrival of Benedictine, Camaldolese and other monks from the Italian Mezzogiorno, Lombardy and Provence, especially the monasteries of Montecassino, Saint-Victor de Marseille and Vallombrosa, boosted the agriculture in a land which was extremely underdeveloped. The condaghes (catalogues, cartularies) of the monasteries, which record property transactions, are an important source for the study of the island and its language in the 11th and 12th centuries. Evidence from the condaghes of San Pietro di Silki, in Sassari, and Santa Maria di Bonarcado concerning the children of slaves has been adduced to show that differences in agricultural lifestyles between regions may affect the survival rate of females, hypothetically through increased infanticide of baby girls. The abbacy of Santa Maria di Bonarcado contained more central, upland regions where a pastoral economy dominated and women were less economically useful; among children in that region, sex ratios are highly skewed in favour of men. On the other hand, in the region of San Pietro di Silki, less pastoral, child sex ratios are not skewed abnormally.

There were four (historically known) Judicates: Logudoro (or Torres), Cagliari (or Pluminos), Arborea and Gallura. Cagliari and Arborea and Logudoro (and perhaps Gallura) were united for a time in the 11th century.

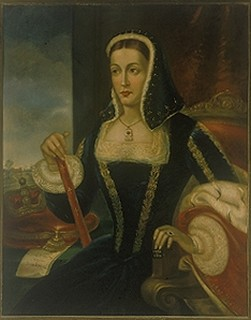
Eleanor of Arborea

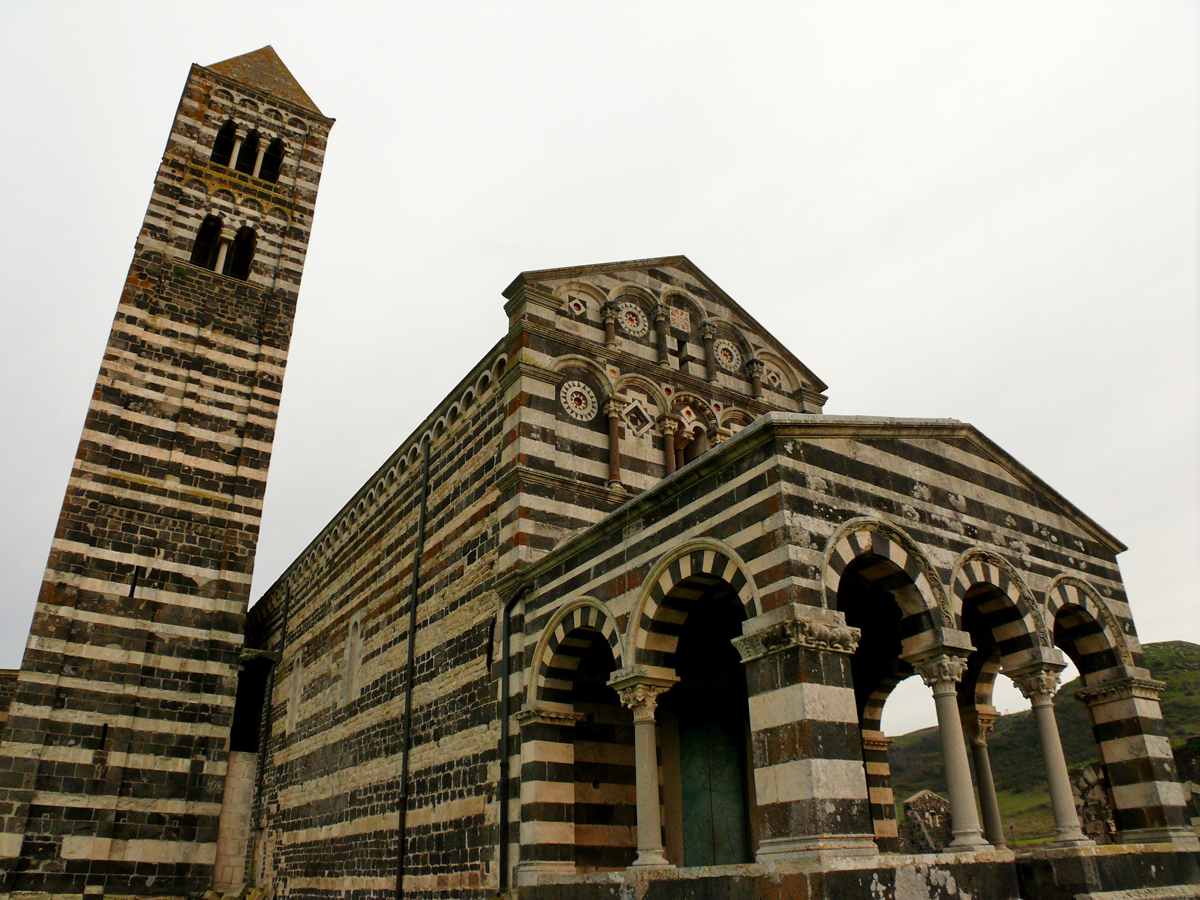
Basilica di Saccargia, the major example of Pisan Romanesque in Sardinia

The initiatives of the Gregorian reformers led to greater contact between Sardinia and the Italian peninsula, especially through the desires of the judges to establish monasteries with monks from continental monasteries at Montecassino and Marseille. By the 12th century, the Sardinian Judicates, though obscure, are visible through the mists of time. They professed allegiance to the Holy See, which put them under the authority of the Archdiocese of Pisa, superseding the ancient primacy of the Archdiocese of Cagliari on the island.

Often quarreling between one another, the Judicates made a great number of commercial concessions to the Pisans and the Genoese. The Repubbliche Marinare soon became the true masters of the Sardinian economy.

In the late 12th and early 13th centuries, all four Judicates passed to foreign dynasties and the local families were relegated to minor positions. Arborea passed to the Catalan House of Cervera (Cervera-Bas) in 1185, though this was contested for the next few decades. In 1188, Cagliari was conquered by the House of Massa from the Republic of Pisa. Gallura became by marriage – it had been inherited by a woman, Elena – a possession of the House of Visconti, another Pisan family, in 1207. Only Logudoro survived to the end under local Sardinian rulers. However, its end was early. It passed to Genoa and to the Doria and Malaspina families in 1259 after the death of its last judge, Adelasia. Only a year before the others Judicates and the Pisans besieged Santa Igia and deposed the last ruler of Cagliari William III. Gallura survived longer, but the enemies of the Visconti in Pisa soon removed the last judge, Nino, a friend of Dante Alighieri, in 1288.

About the same time, Sassari declared itself a free commune allied to Genoa. In the early 14th century, much of Eastern and Southern Sardinia, including Castel di Castro (Cagliari), was under the authority of Pisa and of the della Gherardesca family, who founded the important mining town of Villa di Chiesa (now Iglesias). Arborea, however, survived as the only indigenous kingdom until 1420. One of the most remarkable Sardinian figure of the Middle Ages, Eleanor of Arborea, was co-ruler of that region in the late 14th century; she laid the foundations for the laws that remained valid until 1827, the Carta de Logu.

== Kingdom of Sardinia ==
=== Kingdom of Sardinia in the Crown of Aragon and in the Spanish Empire ===
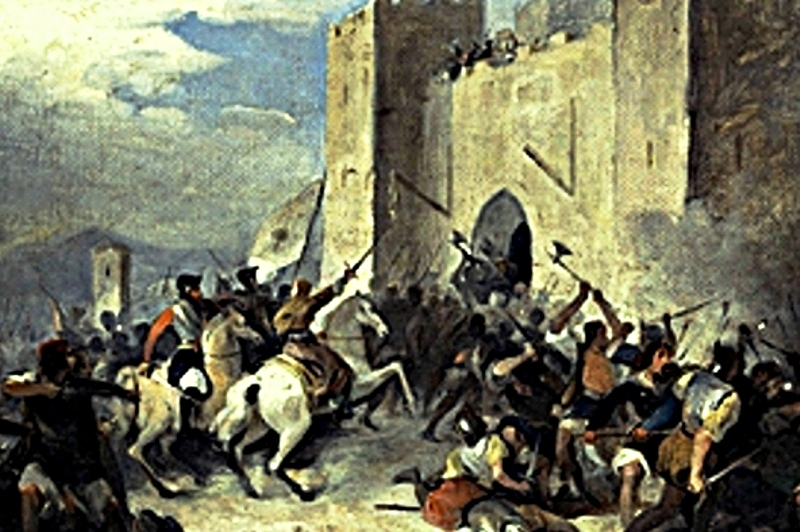
Depiction of the battle of Sanluri by Giovanni Marghinotti

In 1323 an Aragonese army, under Alfonso, son of King James II, disembarked near Palma di Sulcis, in Southern Sardinia. After the fall of Villa di Chiesa the Pisans were defeated again, both by land and sea, at Lucocisterna and in the gulf of Cagliari, and were forced to leave the island, maintaining only Castel di Castro until 1326. The Cagliari area as well as Gallura thus became part of the first nucleus of the Kingdom of Sardinia, established nominally by Pope Boniface VIII in 1297, that was included in the Crown of Aragon.

In 1353 Marianus IV of Arborea, allied with the Doria family, waged war against the Aragonese, occupying much of the island but unable to capture Cagliari. The Peace of Sanluri (1355) ushered in a period of tranquility, but hostilities were resumed in 1365, with Arborea, led by Marianus IV and then, from 1391, by Brancaleone Doria, initially able to capture much of the Island. However, in 1409 the Aragonese crushed a Genoese fleet coming in support the Sardinians, and destroyed the Judicial army at the Battle of Sanluri. Oristano, the Arborean capital, fell on 29 March 1410. William II of Narbonne, the last Judge of Arborea, sold his remaining territories to the Aragonese in 1420, in exchange for 100,000 gold florins.

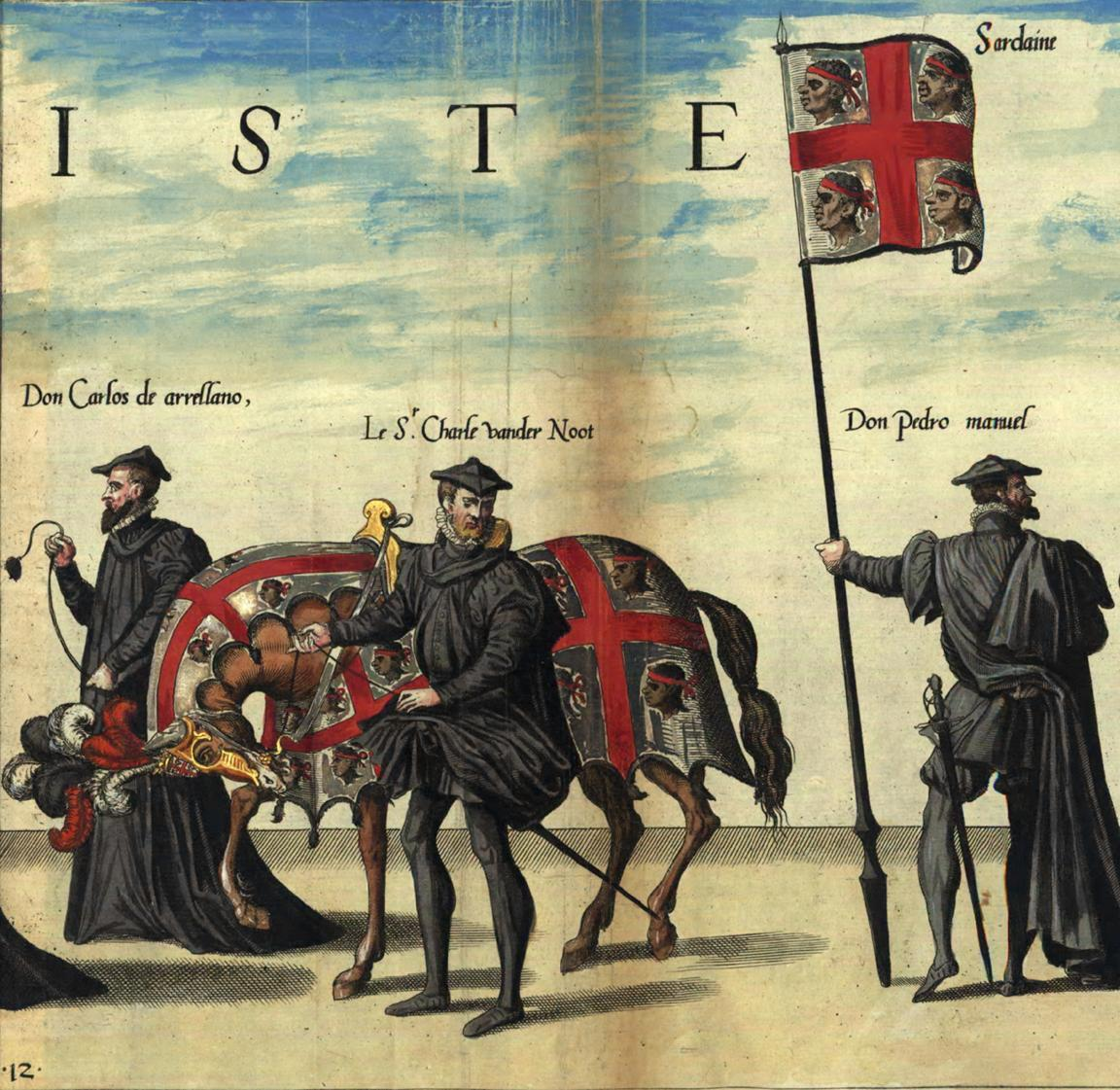
Historical flag of the Kingdom of Sardinia and official flag of Autonomous Region of Sardinia since 1999. Funeral of Charles I of Spain

In the 1470s an important revolt against the Aragonese was led by Leonardo Alagon, marquess of Oristano, who managed to defeat the viceroyal army but was later crushed at the Battle of Macomer (1478). The island endured attacks from North African pirates and a series of plagues in 1582, 1652 and 1655.

In 1527, during the Franco-Spanish War, a French army of 4000 men led by the Italian Renzo da Ceri attacked the north of the island, besieging Castellaragonese and sacking Sorso and then Sassari for almost a month.

In 1566 the first typography of Sardinia was established in Cagliari, while in 1606 and 1617 were founded the University of Cagliari and the University of Sassari.

In the late 15th and in the early 16th century the Spaniards built watchtowers all along the coast (today called "Spanish towers") to protect the island against Ottoman incursions. In 1637 a French fleet led by Henri, Count of Harcourt sacked Oristano for about a week.

=== Kingdom of Sardinia under the House of Savoy ===
Sardinia was disputed between 1700 and 1720. After the War of the Spanish Succession it was assigned to Emperor Charles VI in 1714, Philip V of Spain briefly recovered the island in 1717, but in 1720 the European powers assigned Sicily to Charles VI and Sardinia to the House of Savoy, so Vittorio Amedeo II became the King of Sardinia.

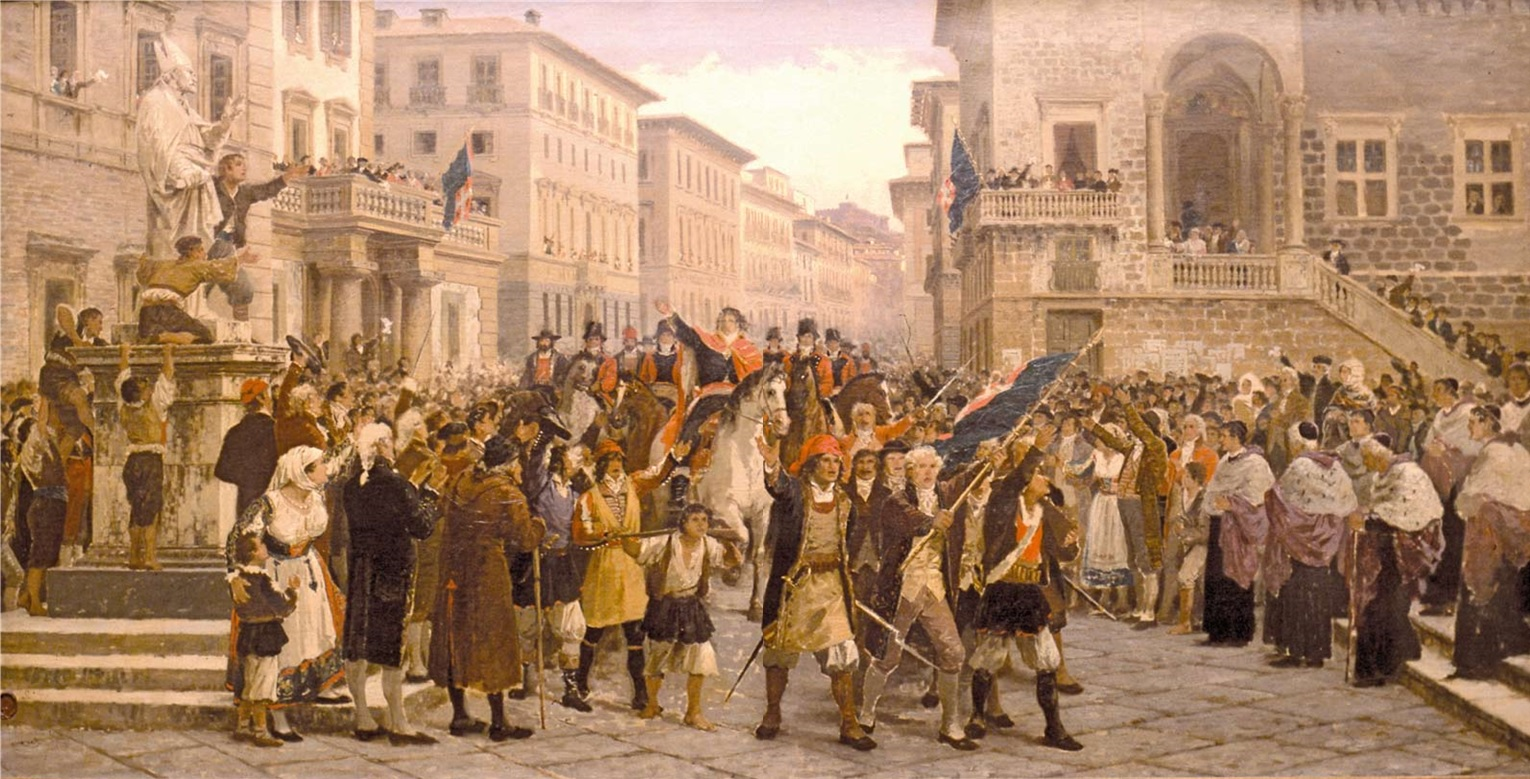
Giovanni Maria Angioy, the Emissary of the Viceroy enters in Sassari (1795)

In 1793 Sardinians twice defeated the French invaders (French expedition to Sardinia). On 23 February 1793, Domenico Millelire, in command of the Sardinian fleet, defeated near the Maddalena archipelago the fleets of the French Republic, which included with the rank of lieutenant, the young and future Emperor of France Napoleon Bonaparte. Millelire received the first Gold Medal of Military Valor of the Italian Navy. In the same month, Sardinians stopped the attempted French landing on the beach of Quartu Sant'Elena, near the Capital of Cagliari. Because of these successes, the representatives of nobility and clergy (Stamenti) formulated five requests addressed to the King Victor Amadeus III of Sardinia in order to have the same rights as the Italian mainlanders, but they met with a refusal. Because of this discontent, on 28 April 1794, during an uprising in Cagliari, two Piedmontese officials were killed. That was the start of a revolt (called the "Moti rivoluzionari sardi" or "Vespri sardi") all over the island, which culminated on 28 April 1794 (commemorated today as sa die de sa Sardigna) with the expulsion of the officers for a few days from the capital Cagliari. On 28 December 1795, insurgents in Sassari demonstrating against feudalism, mainly from the region of Logudoro, occupied the city. On 13 February 1796, in order to prevent the spread of the revolt, the viceroy Filippo Vivalda gave to the Sardinian magistrate Giovanni Maria Angioy the role of Alternos, which meant a substitute of the viceroy himself. Angioy moved from Cagliari to Sassari, and during his journey almost all the villages joined the uprising, demanding an end to feudalism and aiming to declare the island to be an independent republic, but once he was outnumbered by loyalist forces he fled to Paris and sought support from the French to invade Sardinia and make it an independent Republic.

In 1799 King Charles Emmanuel IV was ousted from Piedmont by the French army, and moved his court to Cagliari (his brother and successor Victor Emmanuel I returned to Turin only in 1814). At the end of the 18th century, the Universities of Sassari and Cagliari were restored. In 1820, the Savoyards imposed the "Enclosures Act" (editto delle chiudende) on the island, a legislative act which turned the land's traditional collective ownership, a cultural and economic cornerstone of Sardinia since the Nuragic times, into private property. This gave rise to many abuses, as the reform favoured the landholders while excluding the poor Sardinian farmers and shepherds, who witnessed the abolition of the communal rights and the sale of the land. Many local rebellions like the Nuorese Su Connottu ("The Already Known" in Sardinian) riot in 1868, all repressed by the King's army, resulted in an attempt to return to the past and reaffirm the right to use the once common land.

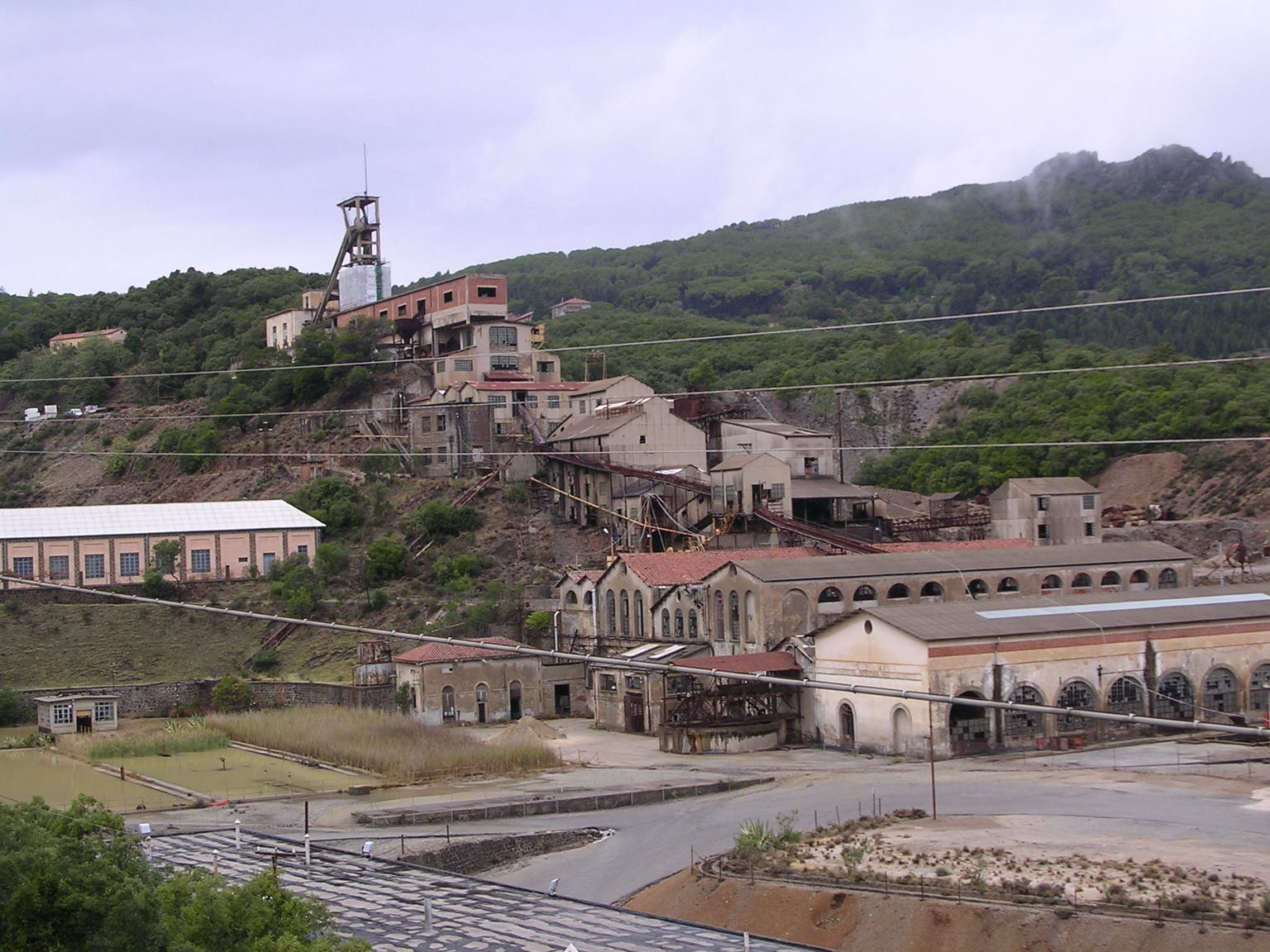
The mine of Montevecchio, Guspini.

In 1847, under King Charles Albert, all the administrative differences between Sardinia and the Italian mainland were abolished through the so-called Perfect fusion: this manoveur had been presented as the only possible way to grant equal rights to all inhabitants of the Kingdom, which would become a unitary state and the basic legislation of the future united Italy as well.

New urban plans and new villages (for example Carloforte, Calasetta and Santa Teresa di Gallura) were realised between the 18th and the 19th centuries. They often followed the urban model of Turin, which now was the capital of the Reign of Italy. New infrastructures were built under King Carlo Felice. The main road from the south (Cagliari) to the north (Sassari) was enhanced (the road still exists today and it still bears the name of Carlo Felice). Also, the first ferry route between the island and Genoa was established, using steamboats such as the Gulnara. The first railway was inaugurated in 1871. By the end of the 19th century the Royal Railways had received 30 locomotives, 106 passenger cars, and 436 cargo cars.

The economy was focused mainly on the primary sector (agriculture and sheep husbandry) and on mining. The majority of mining societies operating in Sardinia depended on non-Sardinian capital money. However, in 1848 the Sardinian entrepreneur Giovanni Antonio Sanna achieved the property of the mine of Montevecchio, thus becoming the 3rd richest man of the Kingdom.

== United Italy ==
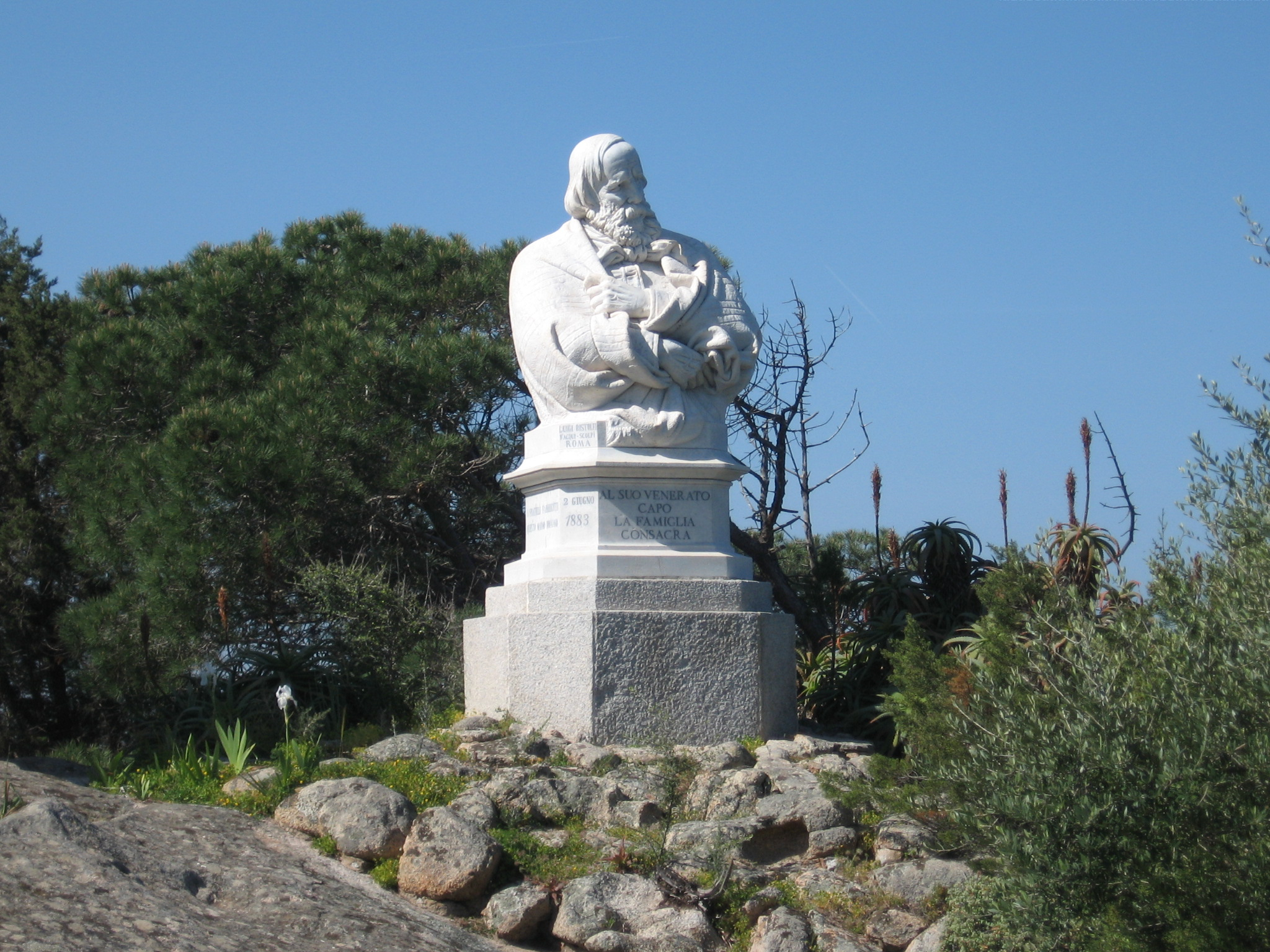
The statue of Garibaldi in Caprera, La Maddalena. His house and farm are now the most visited Sardinian museum.

=== Kingdom of Italy ===
Most Sardinian forests were cut down at this time, in order to provide the Piedmontese with raw materials, like wood, used to make railway sleepers on the mainland. The extension of primary natural forests, praised by every traveller visiting Sardinia, would in fact be reduced to little more than 100,000 hectares at the end of the century.

With the Unification of Italy in 1861, the Kingdom of Sardinia became the Kingdom of Italy. Since 1855 the national hero Giuseppe Garibaldi bought most of the island of Caprera in the Maddalena archipelago, where he moved because of the loss of his home town of Nice. His house, farm and tomb are now the most visited Sardinian museum (Compendio Garibaldino).

In 1883 the first train travelled between Cagliari and Sassari, and in these decades were made all the modern public works: roads, dams, schools, sewers and aqueducts, mainly in the cities.

During the First World War the Sardinian soldiers of the Brigata Sassari distinguished themselves, with several being decorated with gold medals and other honours. Following the war, in occasion of Irish independence the ex-combatants organized themselves into a Sardinian nationalist movement, the Sardinian Action Party, but was eventually outlawed in 1926. In 1924, the Italian Parliament led by Benito Mussolini passed a bill (called la legge del miliardo) to establish a budget of one billion lire to develop infrastructure in order to encourage economic development. However, only a portion of the designated funds were ever distributed, and mainly in Cagliari.

The writer Grazia Deledda won the Nobel Prize for Literature in 1926.

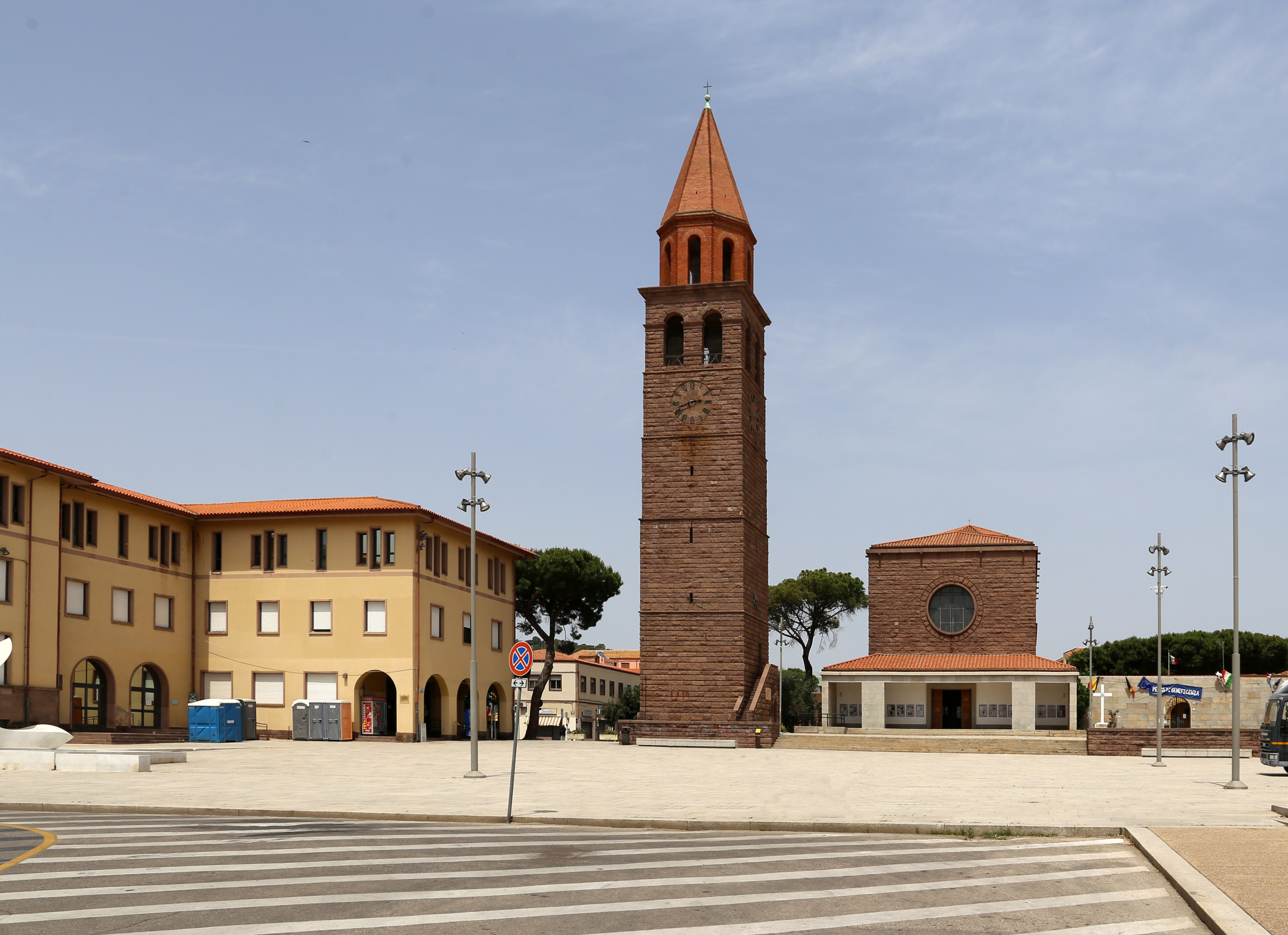
The "fascist coal-city" of Carbonia.

During the Fascist period, with the implementation of the policy of autarky, several swamps around the island were drained and new agrarian communities founded. The main communities were in the area of Oristano, where the village of Mussolinia (now called Arborea), populated by people from Veneto and Friuli, was located, and in the area adjacent the city of Alghero, within the region of Nurra, where Fertilia was built, settled, after the World War II, by Istrians and Dalmatians from Yugoslavia. Also established during that time was the city of Carbonia, which became the main centre of mining activity. Works to drain the numerous waste lands and the growth of mining activities favoured the arrival of numerous settlers and immigrants from the Mainland.

The repression by the Fascist regime of its opponents within the region was ruthless. Rural Sardinia showed little interest in the Fascist state, while the urban bourgeoisie from the cities, some of which being repopulated by Italian mainlanders, were its staunchest supporters on the island. Antonio Gramsci (born in Ales, Sardinia), one of the founders of Italian Communist Party, was arrested and died in prison. The Sardinian-born anarchist Michele Schirru was executed after a failed assassination plot against Benito Mussolini.

During World War II Sardinia was a theatre of bombing; from 1940 the Axis used its airfields for attacks across the Mediterranean, while from 1943 the island was under air attack from the Allies and the cities of Cagliari and Alghero were heavily bombed. (Air raids had also been conducted by an aircraft carrier of the Royal Navy in September 1940, shortly after Italy's entry into the war.) German troops were stationed on Sardinia and Corsica – occupied by the Italians – in 1943. By that July, most airbases in Sardinia had been rendered inoperable by Allied aerial bombing. A number of diversionary raids on Sardinia, Operation Hawthorn, were carried out by the Allies in summer 1943 to distract Axis attention from the upcoming invasion of Sicily, Operation Husky. Operation Mincemeat was an elaborate diversion implemented by the Allies to persuade the Axis's intelligence that their planned invasion of southern Europe would take place in the Balkans and Italy and would feature an invasion of Sardinia. This succeeded in diverting Axis troops from Sicily, the real target of the invasion. The war ended in Sardinia in September 1943, with the withdrawal of the Wehrmacht to Corsica following the surrender of Italy to the Allies under the Armistice of Cassibile, and the island, together with Southern Italy, became free. Allied forces landed on Sardinia on 14 September 1943 and the last German troops were expelled on the 18th.

=== Italian Republic and Sardinian autonomy ===
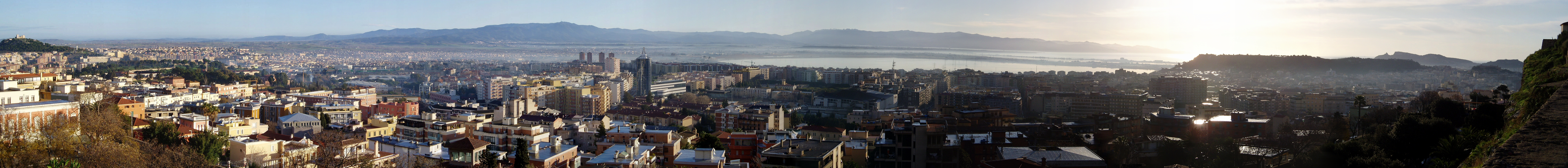
View of some areas of Cagliari and part of its metropolitan area. Together with Sassari and Olbia it is one of the most important economic hubs of the island

In 1946 more than 60% of Sardinians voted in favour of monarchy, just as much as in Southern Italy, but a few days later Italy became a Republic. In 1948 Sardinia obtained the status of autonomous region which, while being the highest degree of self-governance since the Judicates era, fell short of many Sardinians' expectations. The first regional elections were held on 8 May 1949. By 1951, malaria was successfully eliminated with the support of the Rockefeller Foundation. In the same years the Italian economic miracle led to the birth of Sardinian tourist "boom", mainly focused on beach holidays and luxury tourism, such as in Costa Smeralda. Today about ten million people visit the island every year.

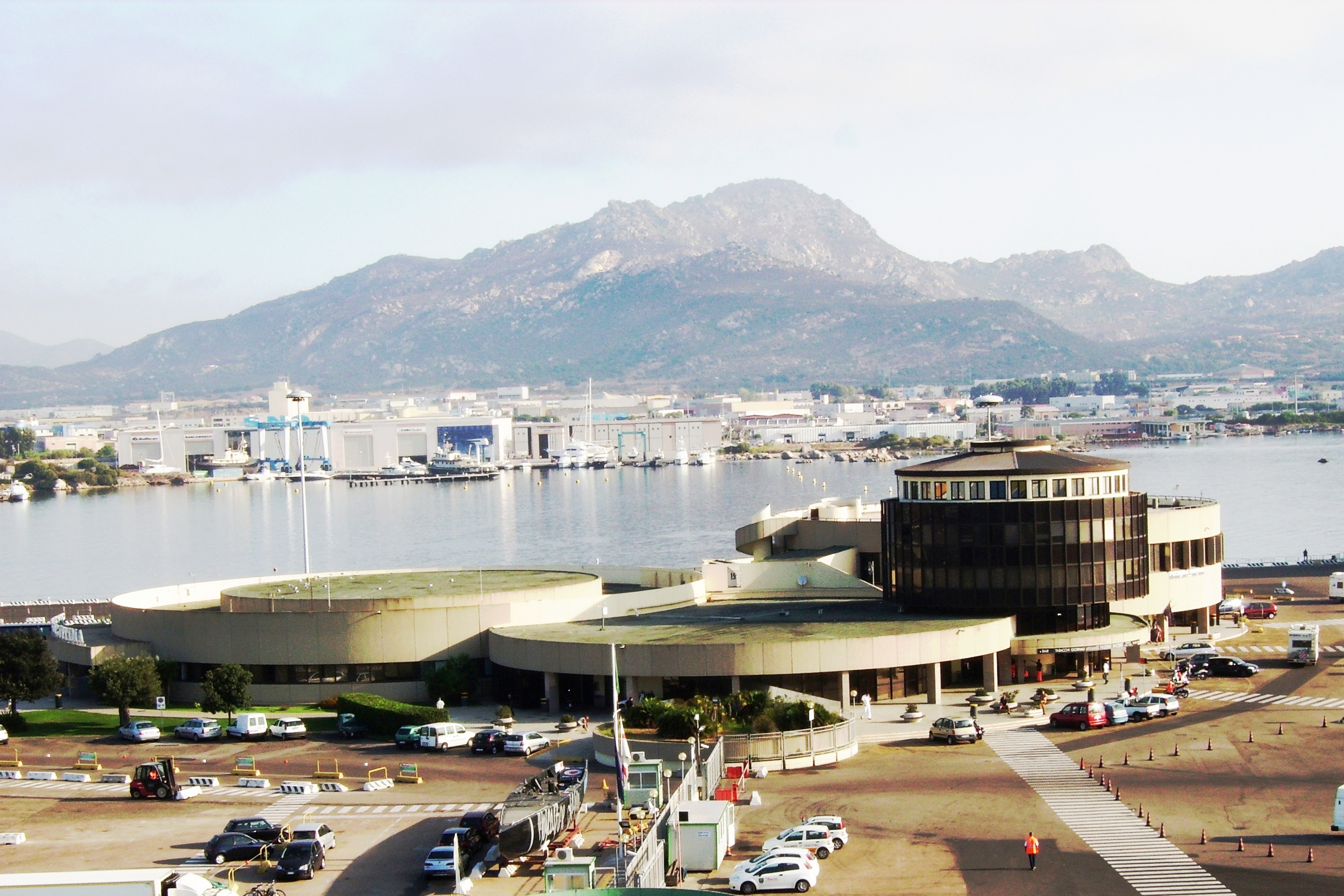
Due to its proximity to the peninsula and the great development of tourism in Gallura, Olbia is the busiest Italian passengers port.

With the increase in tourism, coal decreased in importance. However, shortly after the Second World War a ponderous industrialization effort was commenced, the so-called "Piani di Rinascita" (Rebirth Plans), with the initiation of major infrastructure projects on the island. This included the realization of new dams and roads, reforestation, agricultural zones on reclaimed marsh land, and large industrial complexes (primarily oil refineries and related petrochemical operations). These efforts to create jobs have largely failed due to the high costs of transportation that could not compensate the cheap labor. In the 1950s and 1960s many Sardinians migrated to Northern and Central Italy (Lombardy, Piedmont, Liguria, Tuscany and Rome) and the rest of Europe (mostly in Germany, France and Belgium) but also from the interior of the island to the coastal cities of Cagliari, Olbia and Sassari. In the early 1960s with the creation of petrochemical industries, thousands of ex-farmers became specialised workers, and some others would commence to work on the newly established military bases, created primarily for the NATO. Even now, around 60% of all Italian and US military installations in Italy are on Sardinia, whose area is less than one-tenth of all the Italian territory and whose population is little more than the 2,5%; furthermore, they comprise over 35.000 hectares used for experimental weapons testing, where 80% of the military explosives in Italy are used. Ever since, there has always been a local protest movement expressing deep concern over the environmental degradation the military activities would cause.

Nevertheless, since 1973 the international oil crisis caused the firing of thousands of workers employed in the petrochemical industry. Especially because of the failed industrialization plans, Sardinia is actually the most polluted region in Italy, with over 445,000 hectares of contaminated soil still to be remediated.

Among other factors, economic crisis and unemployment aggravated the crime rate, as evidenced by the increasing frequency of phenomena such as kidnappings and political subversion of the Anonima sarda: between the 1970s and the early 1980s, some communist and nationalist militant groups, the most famous being Barbagia Rossa and the Sardinian Armed Movement (MAS), claimed several terrorist attempts. In the span of just two years (1987–1988), 224 bombing attacks were reported.

In 1983, for the first time ever a militant of a nationalist party, the Sardinian Action Party (Partidu Sardu-Partito Sardo d'Azione), was elected president of the regional parliament. Nevertheless, in the 1980s a number of even more radical pro-independence movements were born, some even managing to evolve into parties in the 1990s. In 1999, after a long period of Italian assimilation policies in Sardinia, the languages indigenous to the island were eventually recognized as "historical language minorities" of the Country, and allowed to formally enjoy co-official status alongside Italian.

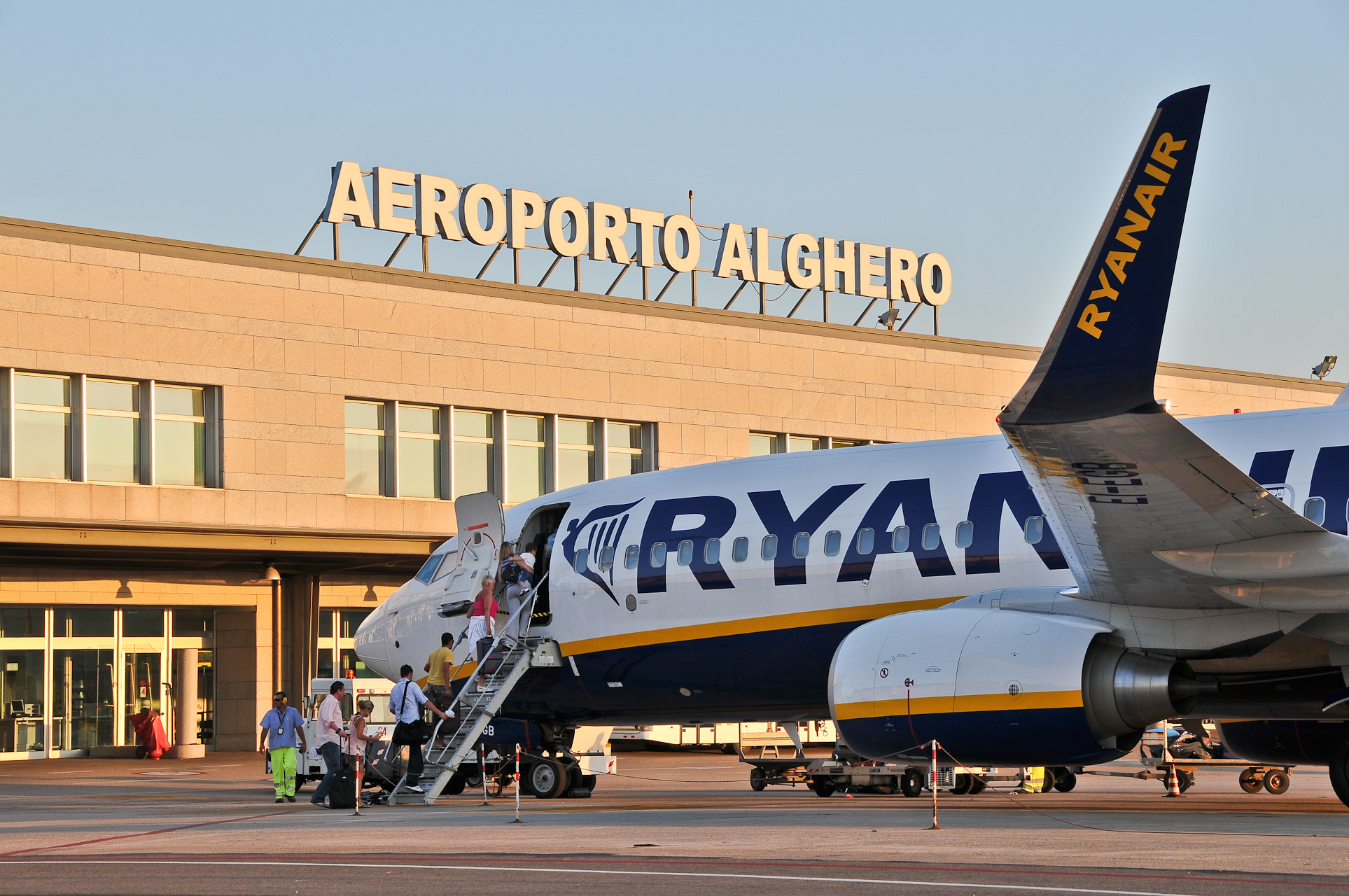
Low-cost carriers serve Sardinian airports such as Fertilia Airport, resulting in major economic impact for Sardinia.

Also noticeable is the difference between coastal regions and the inland. Coastal regions have always been more open to outside influences. Nowadays Sardinia is most known for its coasts (La Maddalena, Costa Smeralda), the north-western coast near Sassari (Alghero, Stintino, Castelsardo) and Cagliari, because these are easily reachable by ship and by plane.

Today Sardinia is a phasing-in EU region, featured by a diversified economy, mainly focused on tourism and the tertiary. The economic efforts of last twenty years have reduced the supposed handicap of insularity, for example with low cost air companies and information and informatic technologies, thanks to the CRS4 (Center for Advanced Studies, Research and Development in Sardinia). The CRS4 developed the first Italian website, and invented the webmail, in 1995, that brought to the birth of several telecommunication companies and internet service providers based on the island, such as Video On Line (1993), Tiscali (1998) and Andala UMTS (1999).

== See also ==
- History of mining in Sardinia
- History of the Jews in Sardinia
- List of Nuragic tribes
