= Sergio Curreli =

Italian serial and contract killer

- Born: 1960 (age 65–66); Arbus, Sardinia, Italy
- Other name: "The Monster of Arbus"
- Conviction: Murder x5
- Penalty: Life imprisonment

Details
- Victims: 5
- Span of crimes: 1982–1990
- Country: Italy
- State: Sardinia
- Date apprehended: 1992

Sergio Curreli (born 1960), known as The Monster of Arbus (Italian: Il Mostro di Arbus), is an Italian serial killer and contract killer who murdered five people in Sardinia from 1982 to 1990, sometimes with the help of accomplices.

Curreli was eventually linked to all of the crimes, for which he was convicted and sentenced to life imprisonment.

== Early life ==
Born in Arbus in 1960, little is known about Curreli's background. He worked as a herder in his hometown, was married to a woman named Daniela Montoni and had two daughters. At some point during the early 1980s, Curreli turned to robbery, during which he also developed a drug addiction and started physically abusing his wife and children. Social services had to intervene on several occasions due to the severe beatings against Curreli's wife.

At some point, Curreli formed a gang in his hometown which primarily dealt with organized robberies, but sometimes also carried out murders-for-hire.

== Murders ==
=== Double murder ===
On 4 September 1982, on a dirt road near the coast of Arbus, a non-commissioned officer for the Air Force noticed a camper van stopped on a small promontory known as Su Pistoccu (The Biscuit). Inside the vehicle, a Volkswagen Type 2, were the naked bodies of two people. They were later identified as 41-year-old German banker Siegfried Heilmann and 25-year-old social worker Marie Heide Helken-Jäger, who were apparently shot two days prior.

Investigators established that Heilmann died first, as he was gunned down through a rear window and was ultimately killed when he fell to the ground. The killer then entered the van, sexually abused Helken-Jäger and then shot her in the back of the head. The interior of the vehicle suggested that the assailant likely looked for something to steal. Due to the manner of death, it was initially suspected that the pair were possible victims of the Monster of Florence, but without any leads, the case went cold.

Years later, Curreli would reveal that he killed the couple after they ran over his hunting dog, Gelosa, and that one of them made a rude gesture directed at him when he began raging at them. Angered by this act, he grabbed a sawed-off shotgun and followed them to the dirt road, where he ambushed them while they were having sex. Curreli claimed that he stole all the Italian currency he found in the vehicle, and that he threw the shotgun down the Ingurtosu mine.

=== Further murders ===
Having gone unpunished for the double murder, Curreli continued to kill, now aided by accomplices. On 22 September 1986, he killed 50-year-old Antonio Frau by hanging him in his sheepfold to steal eight million lire from him. Years later, he would recount the incident as a supposed "prank" done by members of his gang to intimidate Frau, who had had some kind of altercation with Curreli a few days prior. However, the noose was too tight and supposedly accidentally strangled Frau to death.

In early May 1990, Curreli was hired by Rina Ruggeri to kill her husband, 61-year-old butcher Luigi Melis, who had planned to quit his business and go into sheep farming. The motive for the crime was that Rina did not want to give up the money they earned from the butchery business. On 6 May, Curreli ambushed Melis in an isolated area of the countryside near Arbus, where he shot him once with a shotgun, killing him on the spot.

The last murder occurred in November 1990, when Curreli decided to kill 35-year-old Modeno Tuveri, a resident of Guspini who had amassed drug debts. Curreli lured him to an isolated area and shot him once in the head, after which he and his right-hand man, Luigi Mulvoni, burned the body in landfill near Marrubiu.

== Arrest and confessions ==
In 1992, Germany put pressure on the Italian authorities to solve the murders of Heilmann and Helken-Jäger, offering a hefty bounty for any information leading to the killer's arrest. At around that time, Curreli was suspected of involvement in the latter killings by Marshal Felice Maccioni, who found it suspicious that a seemingly modest pastor was driving around Arbus in an expensive Lancia Delta HF. Not long after, he was detained when police found illegal weapons and drug paraphernelia in his sheepfold. Almost immediately, Curreli confessed to the three murders he had committed between 1986 and 1990.

Maccioni then interviewed Curreli's wife, Daniela, and after complaining of his constant abusive behavior, she revealed to the authorities that her husband had confessed to killing the German couple to her years ago. Curreli was then questioned about that crime as well, after which he finally admitted that he was indeed guilty, recounting details only the killer could have known, such as the shotgun's caliber being a 20-gauge, not 16-gauge as previously believed. When pressed for a motive, he said that he wanted to take revenge on Heilmann and Helken-Jäger for killing his hunting dog.

== Trial and imprisonment ==
At his later trial, Curreli and 12 other defendants (including his main accomplice Luigi Mulvoni and Rina Ruggeri) were charged with a variety of offenses in relation to the crimes, and all were convicted of their respective charges. Of these, the most significant were the life sentences imposed on Curreli and Mulvoni, as the latter was an active participant in the killings of Melis and Tuveri.

=== Perjury ===
Two years after his arrest, Curreli contacted the authorities, claiming to know the identity of the man responsible for the fatal ambush of carabinieri Attilio Mazzoni and Leonardo Nencetti, who were killed in Desulo in 1992. According to Curreli, the killer was a local criminal named Giannetto Casula, who had purportedly admitted responsibility for the crimes.

However, when he was brought to trial as a witness, Curreli refused to answer questions, as he was denied admission into a witness protection program. Due to this, Casula was acquitted, and Curreli was charged with perjury. It is currently unclear if he was convicted of this charge and, if he was, whether he was given any additional prison time.

== See also ==
- List of serial killers by country
