= Giovanni Antonio Sanna =

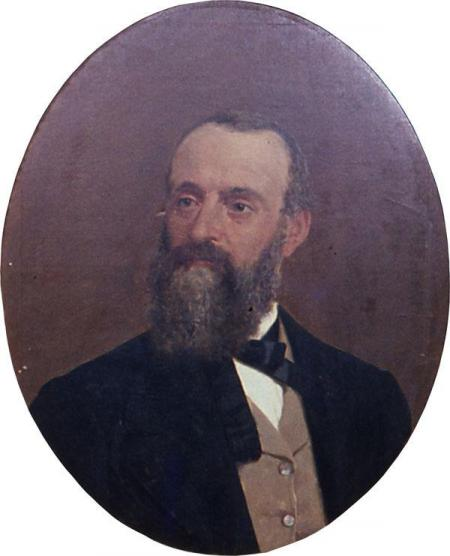
Giovanni Antonio Sanna

Giovanni Antonio Sanna (Sassari, 29 August 1819 – Rome, 9 February 1875) was a Sardinian entrepreneur and politician.

== Biography ==
Giovanni Antonio Sanna was son of Giuseppe Sanna, a lawyer, and Maria Ignazia Sanna. He migrated to Marseille, France, where he became a merchant. He married Maria Llambi y Casas, a Catalonia-born Spanish woman, with whom he had four daughters. In 1860 he became the owner of the Turinese newspaper "Il Diritto". He founded the "Banca Agricola Sarda" (Sardinian Agricultural Bank) in 1871. He was elected deputy of parliament of the Italian Kingdom for three legislatures, from 1857 to 1865.

He became the owner of the Montevecchio Mine, localised in the South West of Sardinia, the main mining site in Italy. He started modern industrial mining activity in the area

== Honors and awards ==
- Knight of the Order of Saints Maurice and Lazarus - 1866

== See also ==
- Montevecchio

== Bibliography ==
- P. Fadda, L´Uomo di Montevecchio, Carlo Delfino Editore, Sassari, 2010;
- R. Ciasca, Bibliografia sarda, Roma, 1931–34, vol. IV, pp. 36–37, nn. 15865-15870;
- F. Spanu Satta, Memorie sarde in Roma, Sassari, 1962, pp. 172–173, 185;
- I. Sanna, Giovanni Antonio Sanna nella vita pubblica e privata, Roma, 1914, p. 416
