= Mount Arcuentu =

Mountain in Italy

Monte Arcuentu
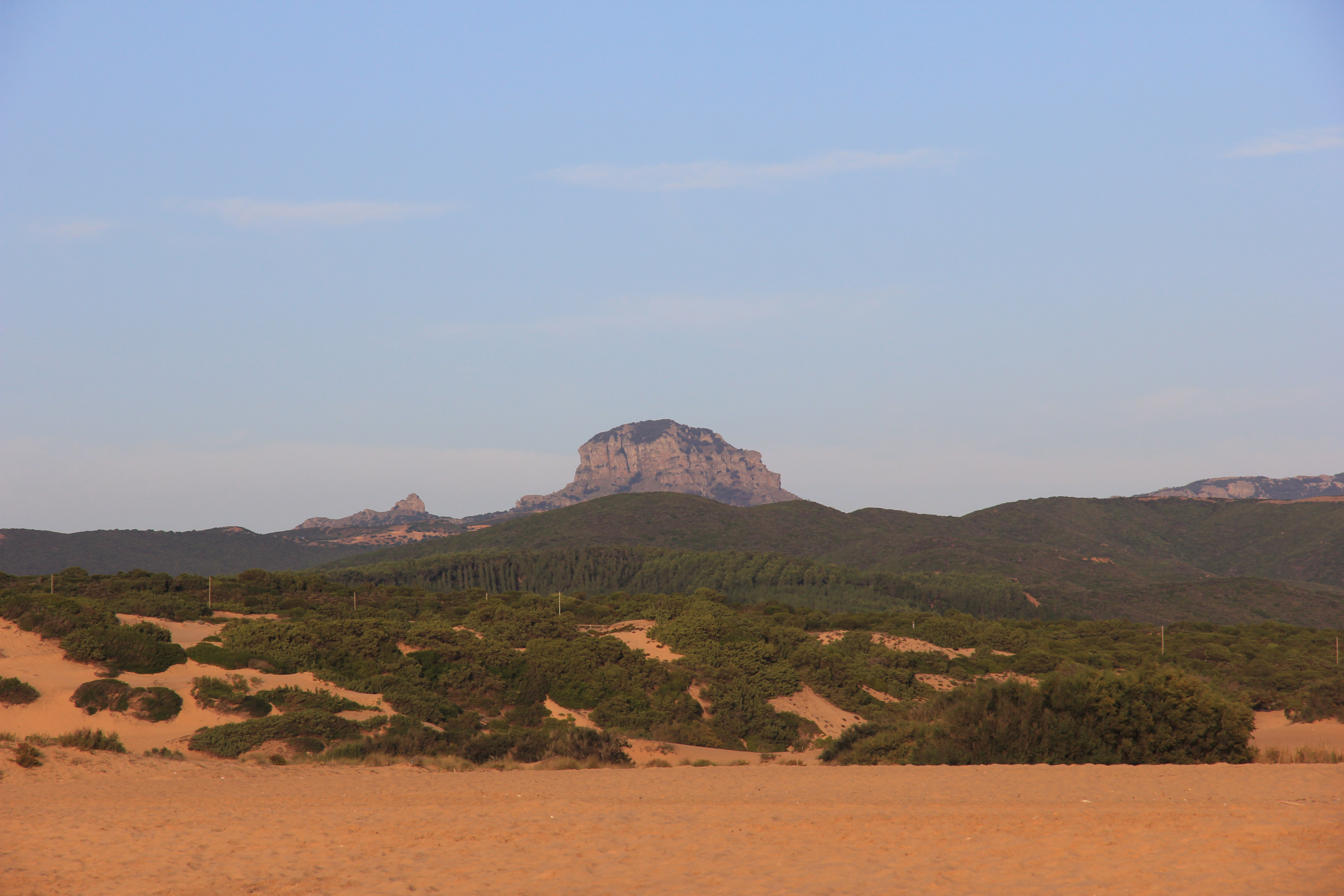

Highest point
- Elevation: 785 m (2,575 ft)
- Coordinates: 39°35′45.6″N 8°32′49.2″E

Geography
- Location within Italy
- Location: South Sardinia, Sardinia, Italy

Mount Arcuentu (Monte Arcuentu), elevation 785 m (2,575 ft), is a volcanic massif situated in southwestern Sardinia, northwest of Guspini. It is a summit of a mountain range which runs parallel to the coastline of Costa Verde for about 8 kilometres (5.0 mi).

== See also ==
- Costa Verde
- Montevecchio
- Province of Medio Campidano

== Sources ==
- Ignazio Camarda (edited by), Montagne di Sardegna, Sassari, Carlo Delfino, 1993. ISBN 88-7138-072-X.
- Bacchetta, C. Pontecorvo; R. Vacca (2007). La flora del Monte Arcuentu (Sardegna sud occidentale). Webbia 62 (2): 175–204.
