= Costa Verde (Sardinia) =

Coastline in Sardinia

The Costa Verde (Green Coast) is a coastline located in the south west of Sardinia, in the Province of South Sardinia. It extends for 47 km from Capo Frasca, in the north, to Capo Pecora and Portixeddu, in the south.

The toponym was initially the commercial name of the first specifically tourist settlement built in the mid-twentieth century, in the area of Portu Maga, but nowadays by extension it is used to indicate the whole coast belonging to the municipality of Arbus.

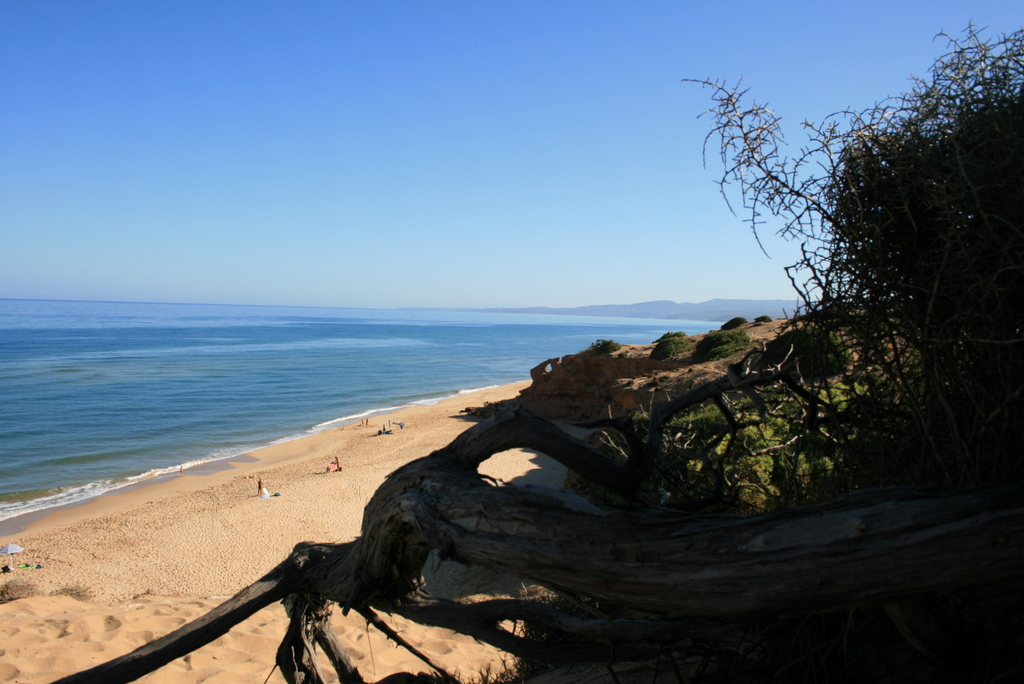
Panorama of Scivu Beach

== Geography ==
=== Places ===
Particularly notable beaches, following the coast from north to south, include:

- Capo Frasca
- Pistis
- Torre dei Corsari
- Porto Palma
- Babari
- Funtanazza
- Gutturu e' Flumini
- Portu Maga,
- Piscinas
- Scivu
- Capo Pecora

== See also ==
- Mount Arcuentu
- Montevecchio
