= Arbus, Sardinia =

Arbus
- Comune
- Comune di Arbus
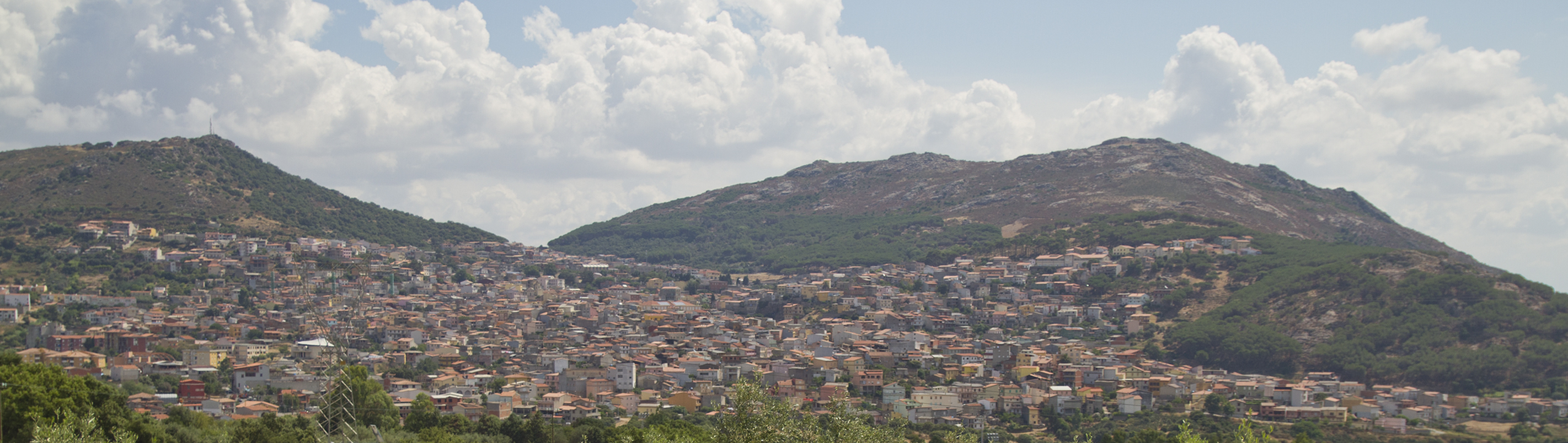
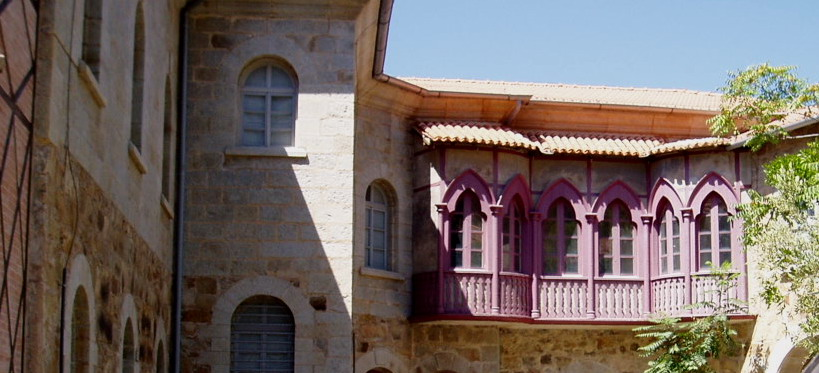
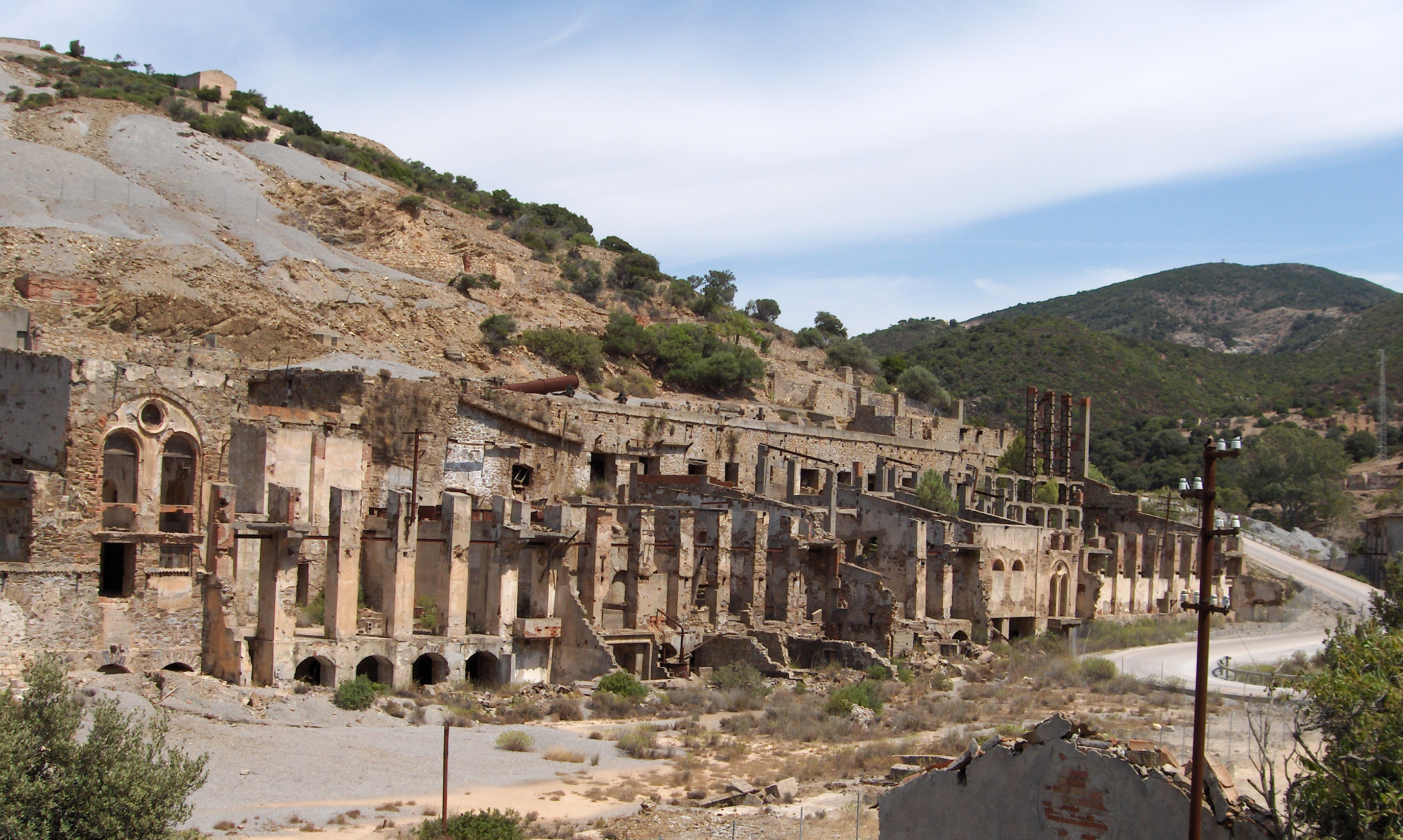
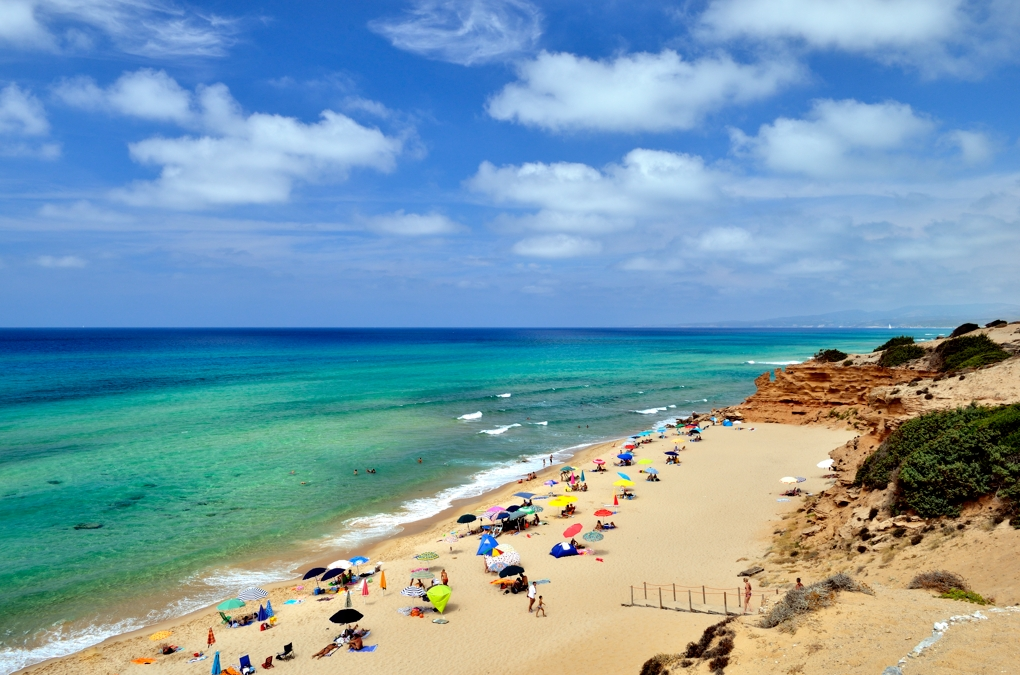
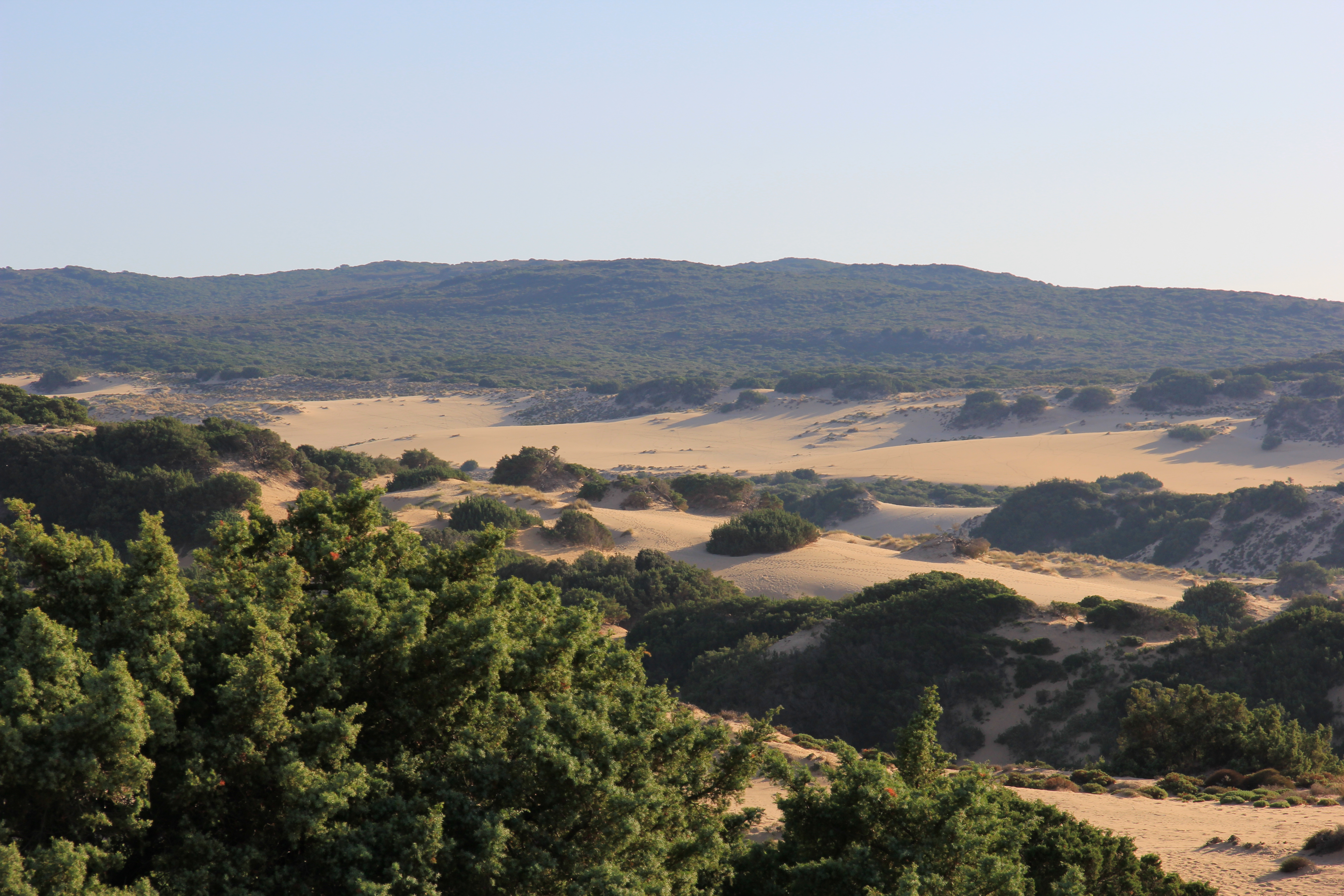
- From top, left to right: Arbus Townscape, Direction Palace in Ingurtosu, "Lord Brassey" Washing Plant, Beach in Scivu, Piscinas' Sand Dunes

- Coat of arms

- Location of Arbus in Sardinia, Italy
- Coordinates: 39°32′N 8°36′E
- Country: Italy
- Region: Sardinia
- Province: Medio Campidano
- Frazioni: Montevecchio, Ingurtosu, S.Antonio di Santadi, Torre dei corsari, Pistis, Porto Palma, Gutturu e Flumini, Portu maga, Sa perda marcada

Government
  - Mayor: Paolo Salis

Area
  - Total: 269.12 km^{2} (103.91 sq mi)
- Elevation: 311 m (1,020 ft)

Population (2026)
  - Total: 5,532
  - Density: 20.56/km^{2} (53.24/sq mi)
- Demonym(s): IT Arburesi; SC Arburesus; EN Arbusians
- Time zone: UTC+01:00 (CET)
  - Summer (DST): UTC+02:00 (CEST)
- Postal Code (IT CAP): 09031
- Area Code: 070
- Public Transit: ARST
- Website: Municipality Official Website; Touristic Official Website

Arbus (/ˈɑːrbəs/, Sardinian: [ˈaɾbuzu], Italian: [ˈarbus]) is a town and comune (municipality) in the Province of Medio Campidano in the region of Sardinia in Italy. With a population of 5,532 in an area of 269.12 square kilometres (103.91 sq mi), Arbus is the 52nd-largest municipality in Sardinia by population and the 3rd-largest by area.

Located in the southwest coast of the island, Arbus is known for several archeological and non-operational industrial sites, such as the mines of Montevecchio, as well as for its coastline, the Costa Verde, whose main beach, Piscinas, includes one of the biggest sand dune systems in Europe.

Arbus territory also includes several hamlets, among which Ingurtosu and Montevecchio are particularly important since they still show tangible signs of the intensive mineral extraction that took place during the 19th and the first half of the 20th century, in nowadays non-operational extraction sites that are now part of the parco geominerario storico ed ambientale della Sardegna (i.e. Sardinian Environmental and Historical Geomineral Park, also known as Geological, Mining Park of Sardinia). The town is well renowned also for its black sheep, that is bred virtually only there, whose milk, and other products derived from them, are listed among the Prodotti agroalimentari tradizionali (P.A.T.) (Traditional Agricultural Products), and for the Arburesa kind of knife, a typical knife handcrafted in town.

== Etymology ==
Although town name's origin is still quite controversial, its etymology has been discussed and the following are some possible origins for its name:

- A first hypothesis suggested that its name might come from the word albus (which means "white"), which might be referred to the important presence of white granitic rocks within the town's territory. With regard to that, Pietro Vidal, in his works, indeed gives the town the name Albus and calls its inhabitants "albesi";
- A second thesis proposed that its name might instead come from the word arburis with reference to the high amount of trees that would be characteristic of the town's territory at the time;
- Finally, according to a last supposition, its name could come from the word arabus, which might refer to the Saracen horde which is thought to have invaded, in the past, the coast part of the town's territory.

== History ==
Arbus has been inhabited by man since the ancient Neolithic. It includes a mountain district which separates Medio Campidano from the sea. There are numerous tombe dei giganti (Giant graves) in the district of Capo Pecora, and in other areas of territory.

=== Early settlement and establishment ===
The actual foundation date of the town is at the current time unknown. Nonetheless, in 2009 in the Saint Luxorious' square situated in the city centre, more specifically while it was being refurbished, a multilayered archeological site, made up of remains of thermal baths and a Roman necropolis, was found, as well as a churchyard and a Spanish church, that date back at least to the 17th century.

The new settlement lies on an artificial terracing build with Imperial Roman building materials, that was placed on already-existing graves.

These new chronological elements that have been provided by the archeological researches and investigations let Arbus' settlement be added to ancient Sardinian topography. Indeed, until those findings were made, Arbus was thought to have been founded during the Middle Ages, at least according to the documentation of the time. Indeed, the town was not included in the list of the pontifical tithe payments relating to 1341 arguably because, differently from now, the town was actually made up of different separate hamlets such as Santu Domini, Santa Sofia, Bidda Zei, Bidda Erdi, Villa Babari, Funtana Atza, Cilirus in Flumentorgiu, "Villa Jaca" and other minor locations but year after year, also because of the numerous incursions by land and sea carried out by Saracens and Aragonese people, these hamlets' inhabitants eventually ended up living in a single town, which would make for the future town of Arbus.

The first actual documentary evidence of the existence of the town is found only the Middle Ages, when Arbus, according to the first volume of the Geographical, Historical, Statistical and Commercial Dictionary of the States of His Majesty King of Sardinia (in Italian, Dizionario geografico - storico - statistico -commerciale degli Stati di S. M. il Re di Sardegna), was the capital, or rather part of the curatory or department, of the Kingdom of Colostrài that, as stated by the same source, was one of the departments of the ancient Kingdom of Arborea in Sardinia. According to these sources, it is as a result wise to say that Arbus was already existing in the Middle Ages but, while the Sardinian Kingdom of Arborea has a 500-year-long history, Arbus has not found yet its place in this long time span.

Besides, the Arbus municipality is cited again in the allodiation act (concerning the cession of properties free from any feudal taxes or obligations), issued on 8 November 1504 and, subsequently, in the Documented History of Sardinian Population (i.e. Storia documentata della popolazione di Sardegna), in which Corridore reported all the Parliamentary Acts with the Statistics of municipalities with regard to the number of fires and their population in 1878.

Furthermore, another important documentary evidence regarding the existence of the town in the 16th century is the report of a pastoral visit of the bishop of the time, Monsignor Andrea Sanna, that took place from 5 to 16 April 1524, in every parish of the diocese, among which also the Saint Luxurious' parish in Arbus is cited.

The municipality managed to preserve his dependency relation with the Barony of Monreale, that belonged again to the Kingdom of Quirra, until the feuds ransom took place in 1836, when it was ransomed by the last lords, the Ostorios, marquess of Quirra, that succeeded the Centelles in 1603. When Sardinia was divided into ten provinces, Arbus was assigned to the Iglesias' province.

=== From the 17th century to the 1800s ===
The town, which was mainly dedicated to agriculture, breeding and sheep farming, went through a considerably slow development, so much so that in 1688 it had barely 989 inhabitants and ten years later the population had only increased to 1,282 inhabitants. In 1728 the population went up to 2,126 inhabitants and, in 1821, it reached 3,000 residents. In those years, also thanks to the vastness of the town's territory, an impulse was given to sheep, goat, beef, pig and horse breeding that, despite the lack in streets available for good transportation, gave life to a significant commercial trade with the close cities of Cagliari and Oristano.

Furthermore, another relevant activity at the time was represented by weaving and in particular linen, cotton, raw canvas and rough woolen fabric (called orbace) production, that were importantly sold to other towns within the Medio Campidano plain, that was carried out by virtually every family at the time: out of 670 registered houses, 600 were equipped with a loom.

When it comes to Arbus' administration, the town, in 1839, managed to do away with the feudal dependency and, in 1848, with the law that created the modern municipalities, was assigned to the administrative division of Cagliari and eventually, in 1859, was included in the accordingly-named refounded province.

=== Mines' era ===
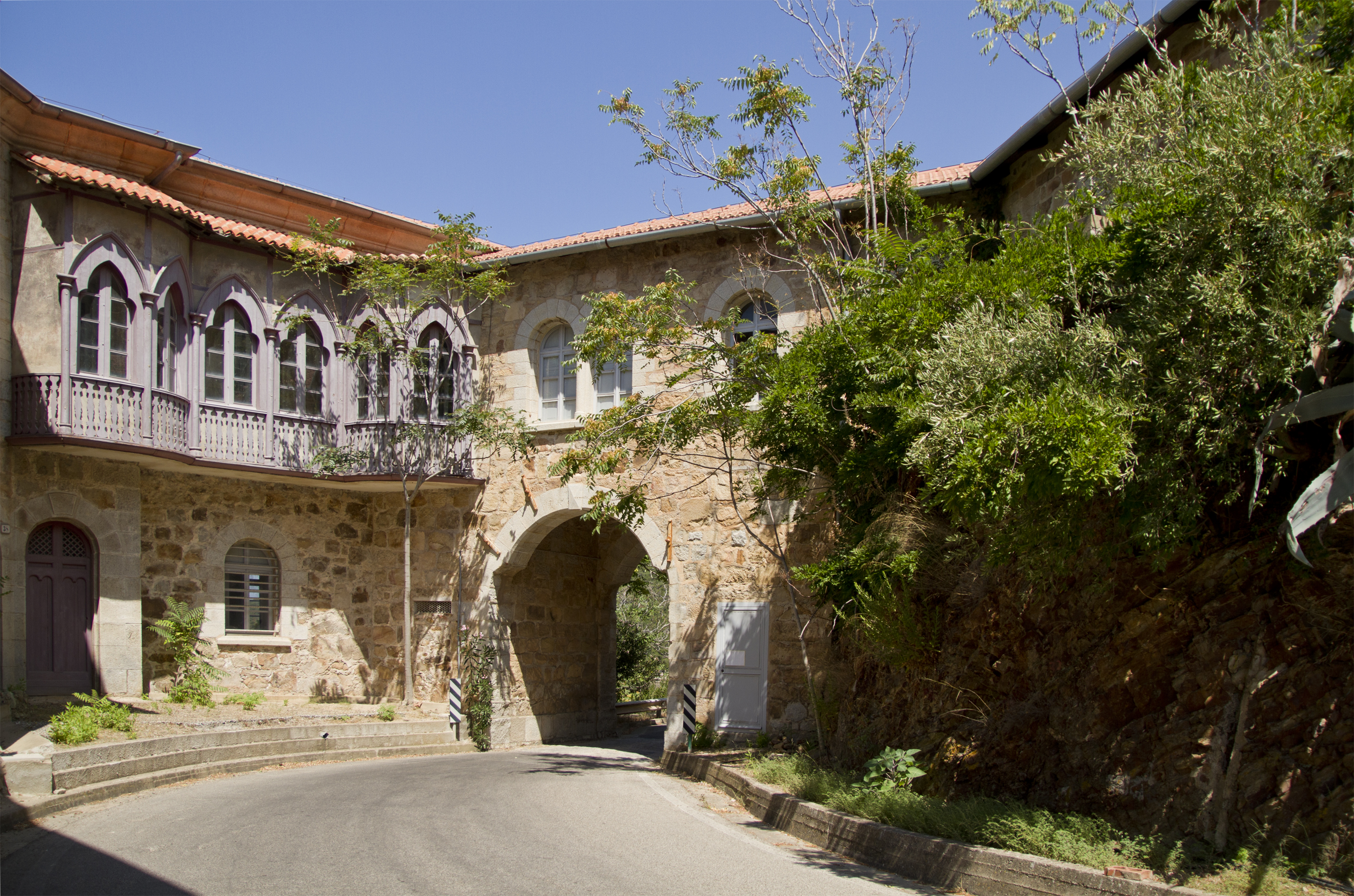
Palazzo della direzione in Ingurtosu

It is for sure wise to say that Arbus' recent history has been strongly characterised by the mine of Ingurtosu that, as tradition has it, was discovered by an Arbusian smith. Ingurtosu mine history is clearly importantly linked with Lord Thomas Allnutt Brassey, a noble English man who owned a company active in the industrial field, "Petrusola", that later on allowed for the construction, in 1900, of the washing plant in Naracauli, that would then be named after him, after having entered, in 1896, the Sardinian Mining Association. In 1914 he became the president of the mine in Ingurtosu and in the following years he funded many different buildings within the hamlet of Ingurtosu itself, such as the Church of Saint Barbara, whose construction started in 1914, that was eventually inaugurated on 21 May 1916. After his election, like all the other directors of the mine did and would do, he lived, during his term and frequent visits in Sardinia, in the Direction Palace of Ingurtosu, usually referred to by locals as "The Castle" for its peculiar characteristics. It was indeed engineered by Eng. J.G. Bornemann, German engineer and former president of the "Sociétè civile des mines d'Ingurtosu et Gennamari", who also oversaw its construction that had already ended before 1870, after Eng. Viktor Bornemann, who would become the director of the mine between 1884 and 1894, had taken over as responsible engineer for the project. Having been mainly engineered by Germans, the building has been artistically influenced by Northern European architectural traditions and, as a result, its peculiar characteristics strongly resemble the ones of Wartburg Castle in Germany, that had for sure inspired Eng. Bornemann who was indeed born in Eisenach, where the above-mentioned castle is found.

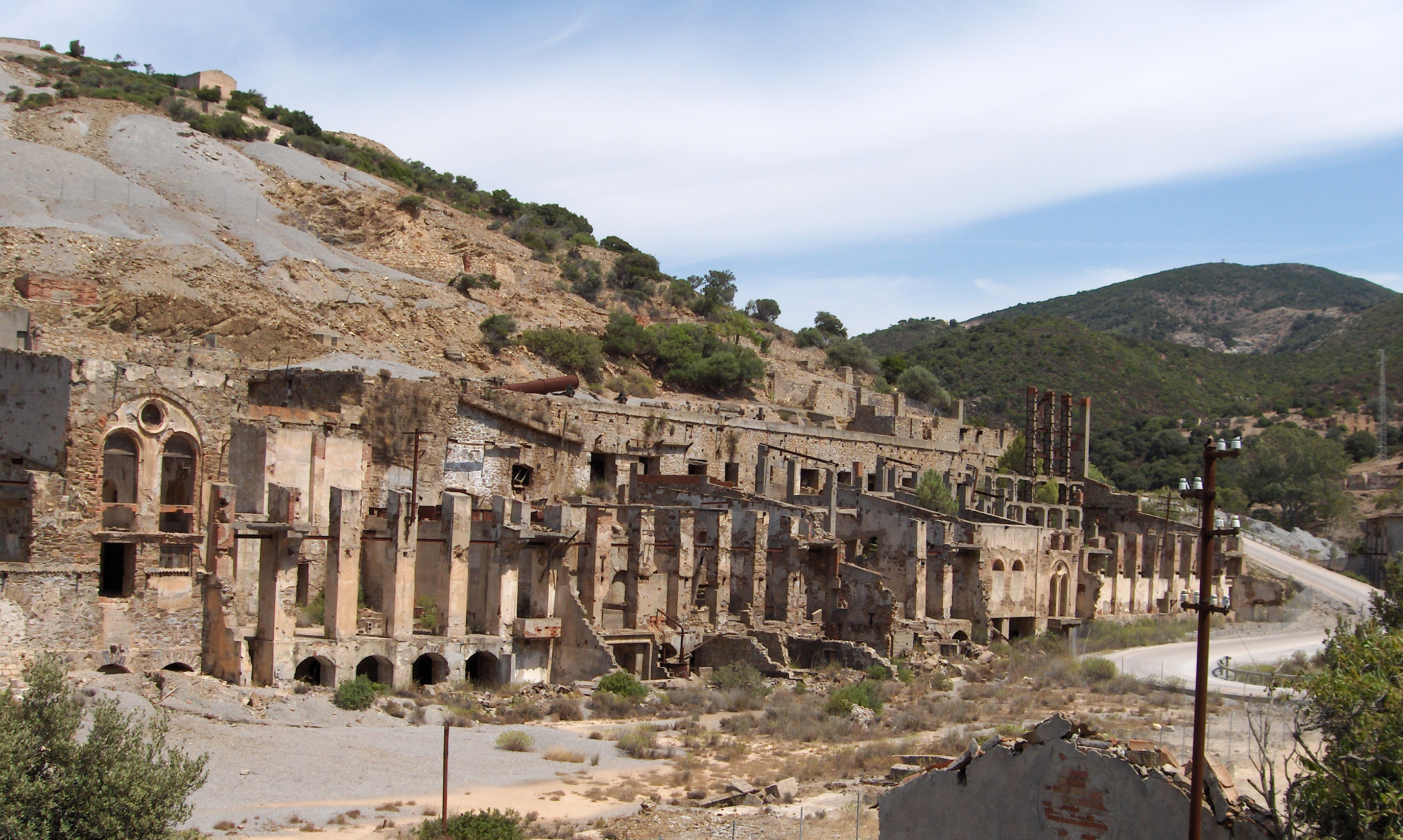
"Lord Brassey" washing plant

==== Workmen's precarious working and health condition ====
Due to the really hazardous conditions in which miners had to work, especially between the end of the 19th and the beginning of the 20th century, and the numerous diseases (e.g. malaria) that spread across the area, workmen's working conditions were particularly precarious and the directorate of the mine itself was already aware of the serious health hazards workers were faced with every day, so much so that Lord Allnutt Brassey, during his term, placed much emphasis on finding solutions at least for those issues and health hazards that could be avoided. As an example, between 1889 and 1918, the mine purchased, at a low price from the Kingdom of Italy, many doses of quinine (a medicine that was thought to be beneficial and useful against malaria) that were subsequently distributed to workpeople. Furthermore, other measures were taken such as providing workers' housing with fresh and salubrious water to prevent other diseases and, in order to further prevent malaria from spreading among workmen, workers' house windows were protected with wire gauze against mosquitoes. In spite of these efforts, the mine directorate soon realized that the main threat was not malaria yet lung diseases to which miners seemed to be particularly subject. As a result, in order to partly mitigate such lung diseases, workers' dwellings were purposely built far from mine pitheads in more elevated positions on the surrounding hills, so that workers would have to walk to reach their houses after their turns over a few hundred yards so that they could "breathe a little fresh air before they reached home". Nonetheless, for the purpose of curing the above-mentioned health conditions, the mine provided an hospital, as well as a doctor and a midwife.

In spite of the precarious working conditions miners underwent, as soon as they got to know that Lord Brassey had died in London hit by a carriage on 12 November 1919, they wrote a letter to express their deepest condolences, "in their own English", to Lady Brassey, in which they said:

"Deeply sorry for the unexpected and tragical death of our Master well loved Lord Brassey, we beg your Highness to agree our hearty condolences. He was the best Man in our world and we shall always remember him with deep sadness"

Lord Brassey

==== Education and schooling ====
According to the Casati Law, that between 1859, when it was issued within the Kingdom of Sardinia, and 1923 regulated the education system in the whole Kingdom of Italy, the first two classes of the elementary school, especially due to another decree, the Coppino Law of 1877, were to be compulsory and free for every Italian citizen, but who had to fund schools and education were the various Italian municipalities. Nonetheless, albeit elementary schools and education were supposed to be entirely provided by Arbus municipality, the commune could economically contribute very little to citizens' education, so much so that, according to Lord Brassey, while he used to pay about 15,000 lire to the commune for the purpose of offering education options to citizens, the commune contributed only with the unarguably low sum of 600 lire. Nevertheless, Lord Brassey also agreed that, when education was provided to adult or young workmen, it was fair that it was solely at the expense of the company. For the purpose of partly overcoming this issue, the mining company also tried to offer evening classes for workmen.

Paradoxically, some sources suggest that Italian engineers who worked in the mines, who had had the chance to study until the highest level, not only were highly skilled, but most of them could also speak English that evidently Sardinian and Arbusian miners could barely speak, if they could at all.

=== Mines' crisis and shutout ===
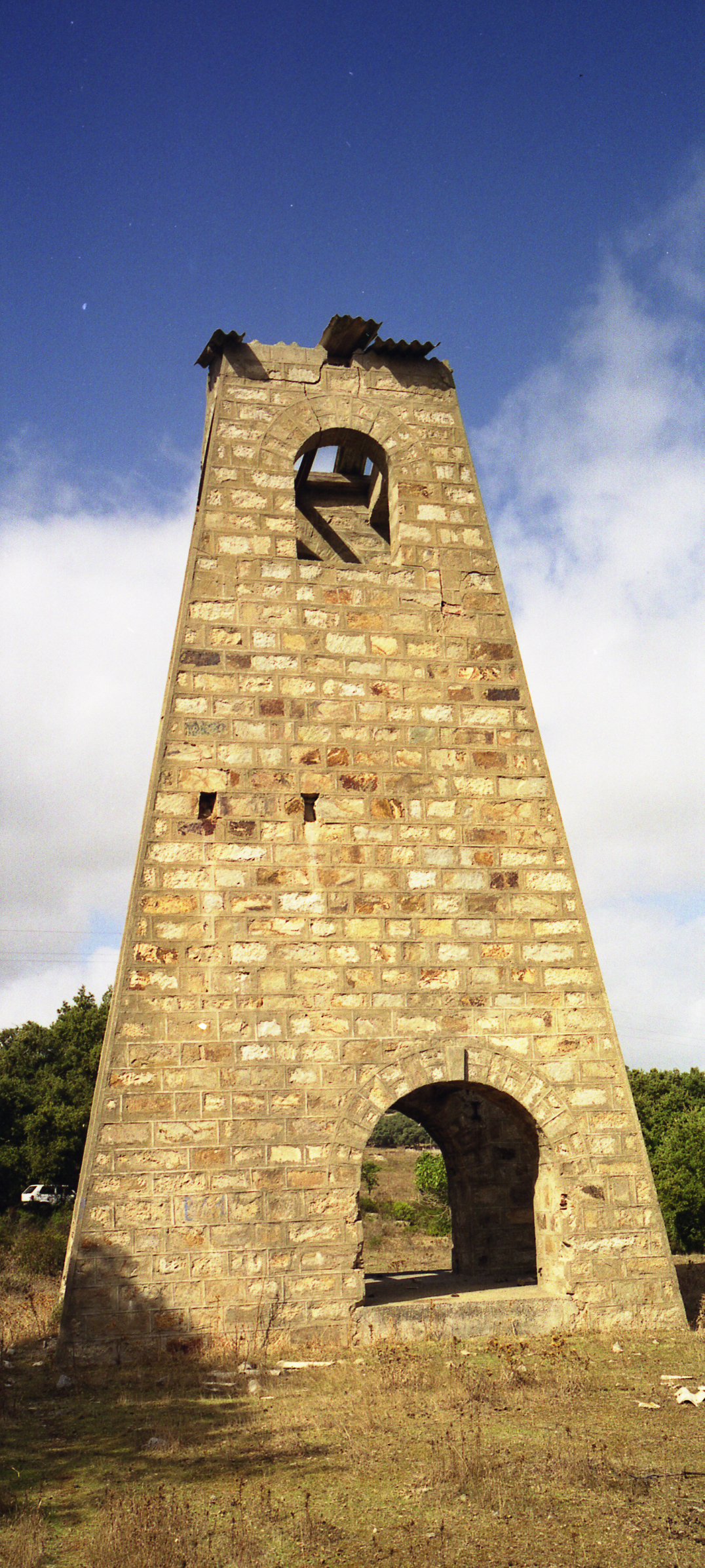
Disused mine tower

After the close mines and mineral extraction sites in Montevecchio and Ingurtosu hamlets had been rather widened and many workers had moved from all over Sardinia for the purpose of working there, in 1901 Arbus was one of the biggest towns, in terms of inhabitants, within the Ales' diocese.

In this regard, it should not be forgotten that the mines located in Ingurtosu and Montevecchio were, even at the outbreak of the Second World War, some of the most important mining sites in Europe, so much so that, together, they accounted for about one half of the whole lead production of Italy.

The further development of the mineral extraction activities in town after the Second World War led to a rather sudden increase of the town's population that reached and outnumbered 10,000 inhabitants, that later on decreased as a result of the mines' crisis and their subsequent shutdown. Indeed, the mine in Ingurtosu, that had taken up its extraction activities in 1855, went through its first serious crisis in 1943, when many workers were fired. After the Second World War had ended, the activity of the mine restarted, yet the mine decline had inevitably started and such a terrible state of things led to the mine shutdown in 1968.

=== Slow decline, attempts of improvement, and modern tourism ===
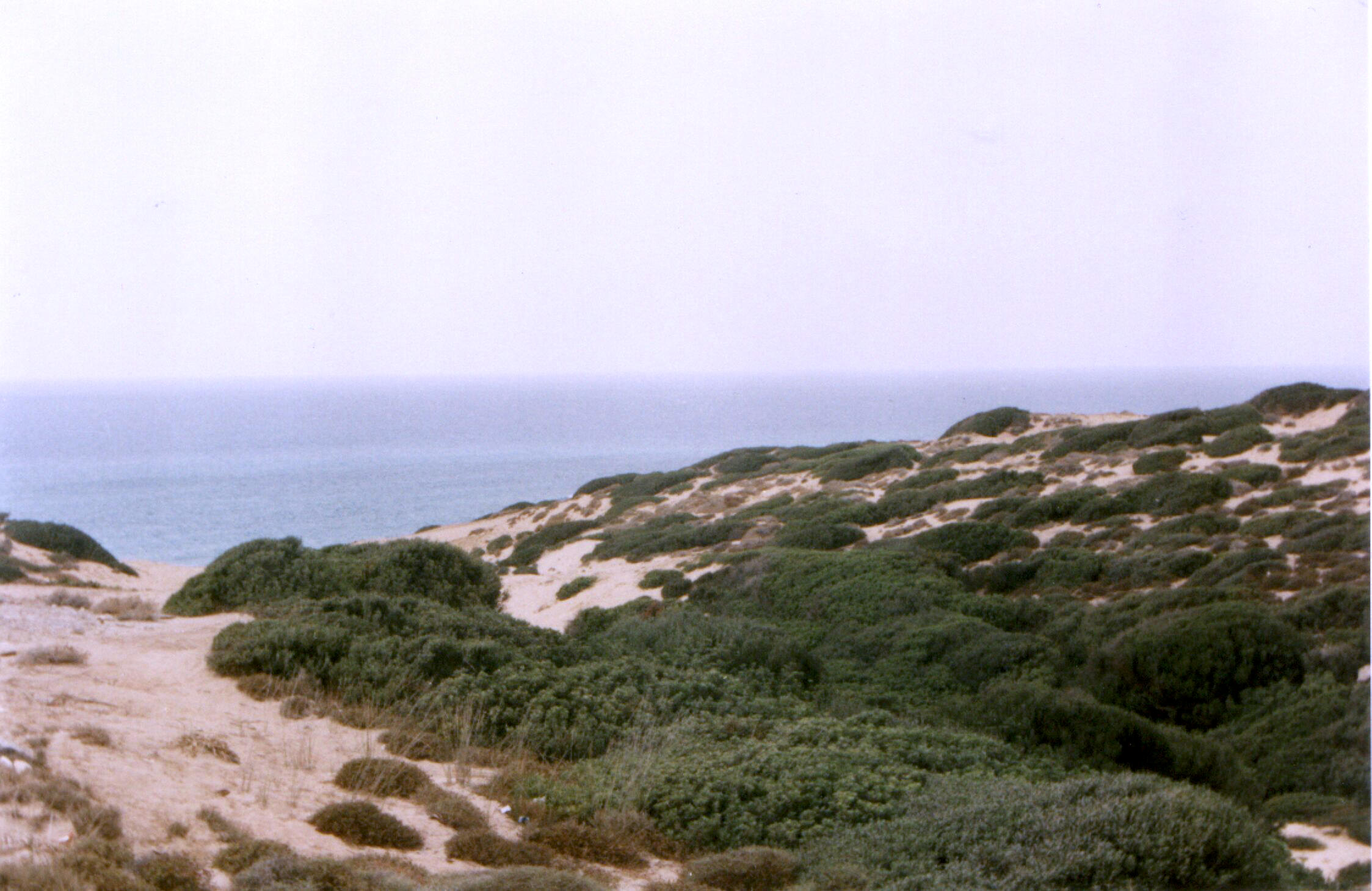
Scivu Beach

Before the end of the 20th century, town's population had already declined substantially, as a result of the mines' shutdown in the town's coast, and indeed its population, that was close to 10,000 inhabitants in the mid 20th century, reached the present figure which sees a bit more than 6,000 inhabitants overall. But nowadays new perspectives are offered to the town's economy thanks to an increasing emphasis that has been placed in the touristic facilities in the town's coast areas and hamlets. Such touristic industry is thought to be fundamental for the town's economy, since it might eventually let the present significant occupational crisis be overcome. An important part of the town's economy has now become tourism, and in particular the one carried out in the coast area of the town with its 47-kilometer-long coastline. While bathing and sunbathing are arguably the most widespread, common activities among tourists, there is also, across the town, a strong presence of bed and breakfasts as well as much agritourism in the territory, especially next to the coast. Other facilities and activities are made possible by the town's unarguably fascinating territory that is clearly favourable to camping and excursions in the wild. The town's fundamental environmental importance is underpinned and has been as a result further validated by the presence in the town's territory of six sites of community importance as well as a WWF Oasis. Moreover, the mines' shutdown made it possible to give tourists access to mines' former extraction sites which have now been mostly made into museums. Indeed, this territory is now part of the parco geominerario storico ed ambientale della Sardegna (i.e. Sardinian Environmental and Historical Geomineral Park, also known as Geological, Mining Park of Sardinia).

== Symbols ==
Coat of arms of Arbus

The coat of arms and symbol of the municipality was granted on 2 September 1998 in compliance with the following D.P.R. (Head of State Decree):

Cut-up, in the 1st [section] with a golden background, a pickaxe and a black spade, decussated, crossed by an hexagonal mining lamp colored accordingly, lit in red, linked with a black ten-ring chain, placed in the guise of a pole, coming out of the top; in the 2nd coloured in azure, a naturally rocky mountain, that resembles the Arcuentu mountain, that is sustained by the wavy-profiled green ground, that comes out of the right side and is extended to the separation line; and everything in an azure countryside, with silver-coloured coastal waves, along with a boat, with a natural wooden hull and two silver sails. The external decorations are those typical of a municipality.
(D.P.R. (Head of State Decree) as of September 2nd 1998, English translation)

Town's standard is instead described as it follows:

Drape divided into two sections, respectively green and white, richly adorned with silver embroideries and with the above-mentioned symbol on the top with a centered silver inscription, in which the name of the municipality is found. The metal parts as well as the ribbons are silver. The vertical pole is thoroughly covered with some velvet in the same colours as the drape with some alternated silver tacks placed in the guise of a spiral. In the arrow above the symbol of the municipality will be depicted and, on its stem, its name will be engraved. Furthermore, on the top there is also a tie made of a tape, which makes use of the national colours, with silver edges.
(D.P.R. (Head of State Decree) as of September 2nd 1998, English translation)

== Geography ==
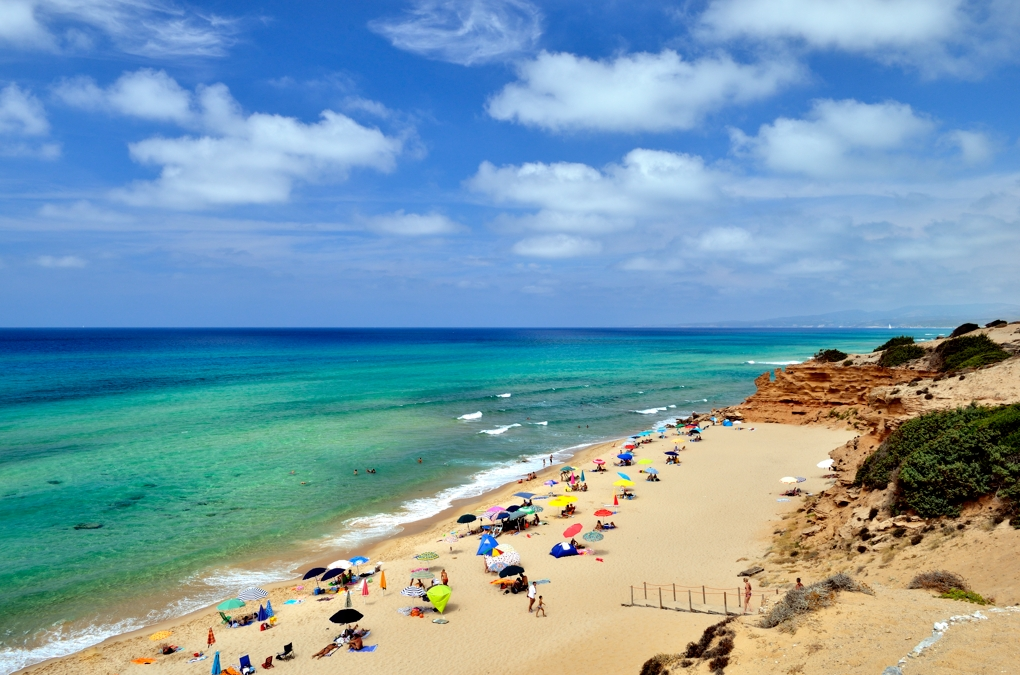
Scivu Beach

Situated in the South-west part of the island, Arbus municipality's territory is roughly surrounded by some mountains whose highest peaks are Linas Mount (1,236 metres (4,055 ft) MSL) in the south and Arcuentu Mount (785 metres (2,575 ft) MSL) in the north. Town's territory is roughly 26,000 hectares (64,000 acres) wide and, as a result, is the third municipality in Sardinia for its territory extension after Sassari and Olbia municipalities.

The town in situated in the valley that originates from Genna 'e Frongia's pass and is surrounded by stunning mounts and woods, but important parts of the town's territory are also the Arcuentu mount massif and the surrounding mounts, that separate the Medio Campidano plain from the sea, as well as the hilly area, with the Ingurtosu, Gennamari and Montevecchio's no-longer-operational mines, that gradually lowers and leads to the coast, which is about 47 kilometres long, from Frasca Cape in the north, down to Sheep Cape (i.e. Capo Pecora) in the south, that clearly includes, in the middle, the famous Green Coast (i.e. Costa Verde), which is situated between Piscinas and Funtanazza's beaches.

Town's hinterland is characterised by plenty of extraction sites full of minerals, that definitely make for memories of the former main economic activity in town. By the way, such a territory has always been well known for its being so rich of minerals, so much so that Phoenicia were already aware of its existence and took advantage of it. Later on, after having been made into an important industrial area, it became a rather significant built-up area for those who used to work in the mines.

=== Climate ===
The climate in town is Mediterranean, with dry summers and mild yet wet winters.

Climate data for Capo Frasca (1991–2020)
Month	Jan	Feb	Mar	Apr	May	Jun	Jul	Aug	Sep	Oct	Nov	Dec	Year
Mean daily maximum °C (°F)	13.4 (56.1)	13.2 (55.8)	15.2 (59.4)	17.7 (63.9)	21.3 (70.3)	25.6 (78.1)	28.5 (83.3)	29.2 (84.6)	26.2 (79.2)	22.8 (73.0)	18.0 (64.4)	14.6 (58.3)	20.5 (68.9)
Daily mean °C (°F)	10.6 (51.1)	10.4 (50.7)	12.1 (53.8)	14.5 (58.1)	17.8 (64.0)	22.0 (71.6)	24.8 (76.6)	25.4 (77.7)	22.7 (72.9)	19.4 (66.9)	15.1 (59.2)	12.0 (53.6)	17.2 (63.0)
Mean daily minimum °C (°F)	7.9 (46.2)	7.5 (45.5)	9.0 (48.2)	11.3 (52.3)	14.4 (57.9)	18.5 (65.3)	21.2 (70.2)	21.8 (71.2)	19.2 (66.6)	16.0 (60.8)	12.2 (54.0)	9.3 (48.7)	14.0 (57.2)
Average precipitation mm (inches)	49.0 (1.93)	55.1 (2.17)	40.3 (1.59)	47.8 (1.88)	41.0 (1.61)	15.2 (0.60)	3.6 (0.14)	8.0 (0.31)	38.6 (1.52)	67.3 (2.65)	92.3 (3.63)	73.9 (2.91)	532.1 (20.94)
Average precipitation days (≥ 1.0 mm)	8	8	6.5	6.37	5.22	1.93	0.61	1.37	3.62	7	9.2	9.6	67.42
Average relative humidity (%)	85.37	83.02	82.79	82.27	80.77	79.25	79.28	78.04	79.23	82.05	83.58	85.31	81.75

=== Geology ===
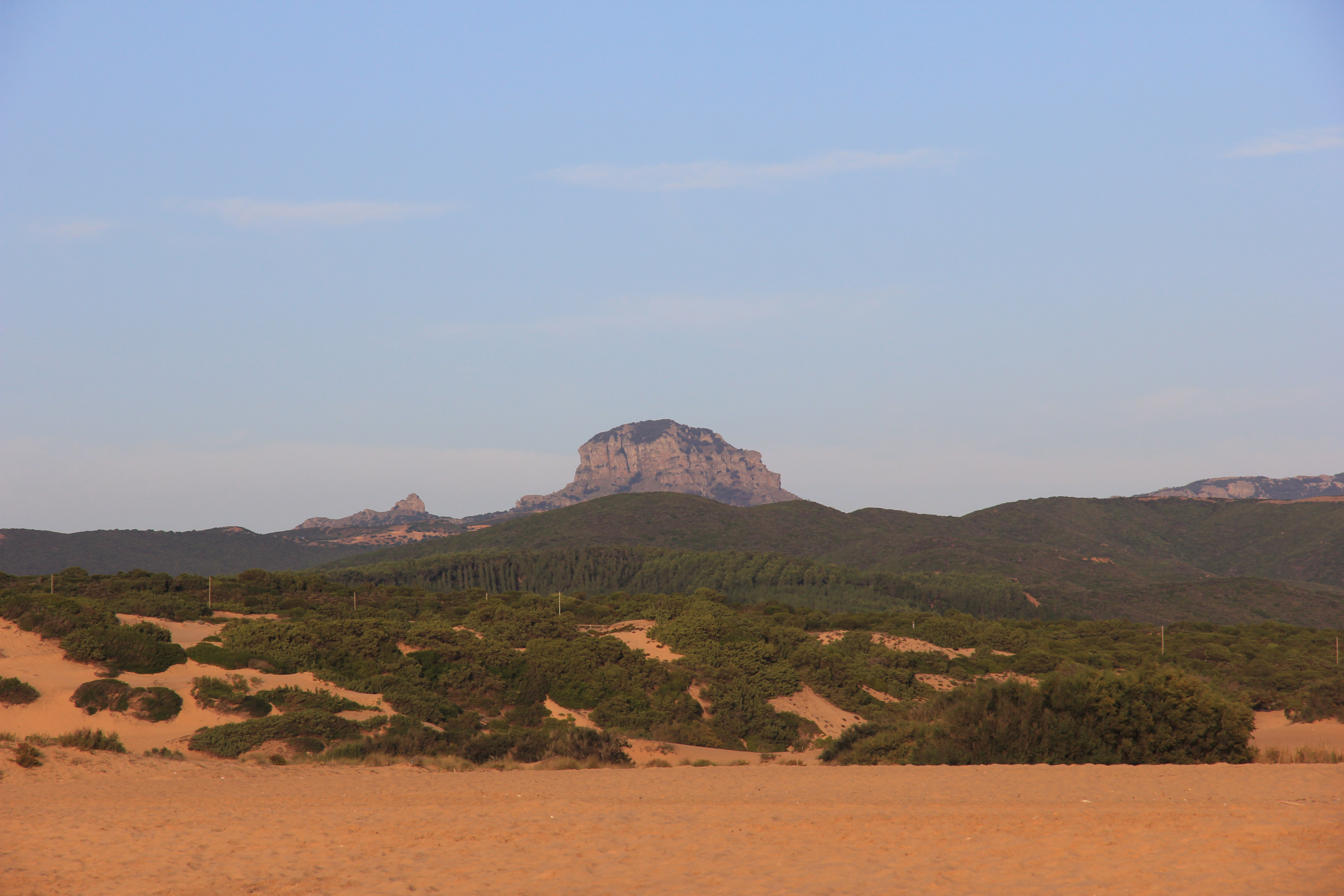
Arcuentu Mountain

Located about 60 kilometres (37 miles) northwestward of Cagliari along the southwestern coastline, Arbus' region, from a geological point of view, is dominated by low-grade metamorphics intruded, in late-Variscan times, by granodioritic and leucogranitic magmas forming the so-called "Arbus igneous pluton". This pluton emplaced at 304 ± 1 Ma (U-Pb dating on zircons), along a thrust surface separating a pile of allochthonous tectonic units from the Foreland. This age, inside the correlated error, is undistinguishable from 305 ± 13 Ma obtained with Rb/Sr isochron for granodiorites. Remarkably, in the wide compositional spectrum of late-Variscan magmatism from Sardinia, the Arbus intrusives are quite distinctive. Indeed, granodiorites contain orthopyroxene and clinopyroxene in addition to ubiquitous dark mica, while leucogranites show often sub-vertical centimetric cloths of Fe-cordierite with quartz intergrowths or greenish to bluish tourmaline. Arbus is known for its coastline, known as Costa Verde. For both 2002 and 2003, the wide Arbus coasts were awarded "5 sails" by the Legambiente and Touring Club. Beaches include, from north to south, Capo Frasca, Pistis, Torre dei Corsari, Porto Palma, Babari, Funtanazza, Gutturu Flumini (Marina di Arbus), Portu Maga, Piscinas, Scivu and Capo Pecora.

Piscinas is a sandy beach with a large dune system spanning approximately 5 square kilometres (2 square miles). It is considered to be one of the biggest dune systems in Europe.

== Demographics ==
Historical population
Year	Pop.	±%
1861	3,765	—
1871	3,858	+2.5%
1881	4,888	+26.7%
1901	6,473	+32.4%
1911	8,457	+30.7%
1921	6,478	−23.4%
1931	7,575	+16.9%
1936	8,069	+6.5%
1951	9,321	+15.5%
1961	10,152	+8.9%
1971	8,325	−18.0%
1981	7,978	−4.2%
1991	7,596	−4.8%
2001	7,021	−7.6%
2011	6,575	−6.4%
2021	5,843	−11.1%
Source: ISTAT

As of 2026, the population is 5,532, of which 49.5% are male, and 50.5% are female. Minors make up 10.3% of the population, and seniors make up 32.8%.

=== Languages ===
While the most widespread and common language spoken in Arbus is Italian, Campidanese is also spoken, especially by the elderly, who still at times use the Sardinian language in order to communicate on a daily basis, especially in a domestic context. Due to the increasingly high touristic importance of the town as well as of the whole Sardinian region, also English is widely spoken in touristic facilities and also, most importantly, among teenagers since its learning was made compulsory in the early 2000s since Primary School.

According to the figures and data provided by the Italian National Institute of Statistics (ISTAT) in 2017 (but relating to 2015), 45.8% of Sardinians could speak English and, more specifically, while only 6.4% of them stated to have achieved a native-like or in any case high proficiency, 38.9% of them declared to have a sufficient knowledge of the language.

=== Immigration ===
As of 2025, immigrants make up 1.5% of the total population. The 5 largest foreign countries of birth are Romania, France, the Czech Republic, Argentina, and Brazil.

== Festivals and events ==
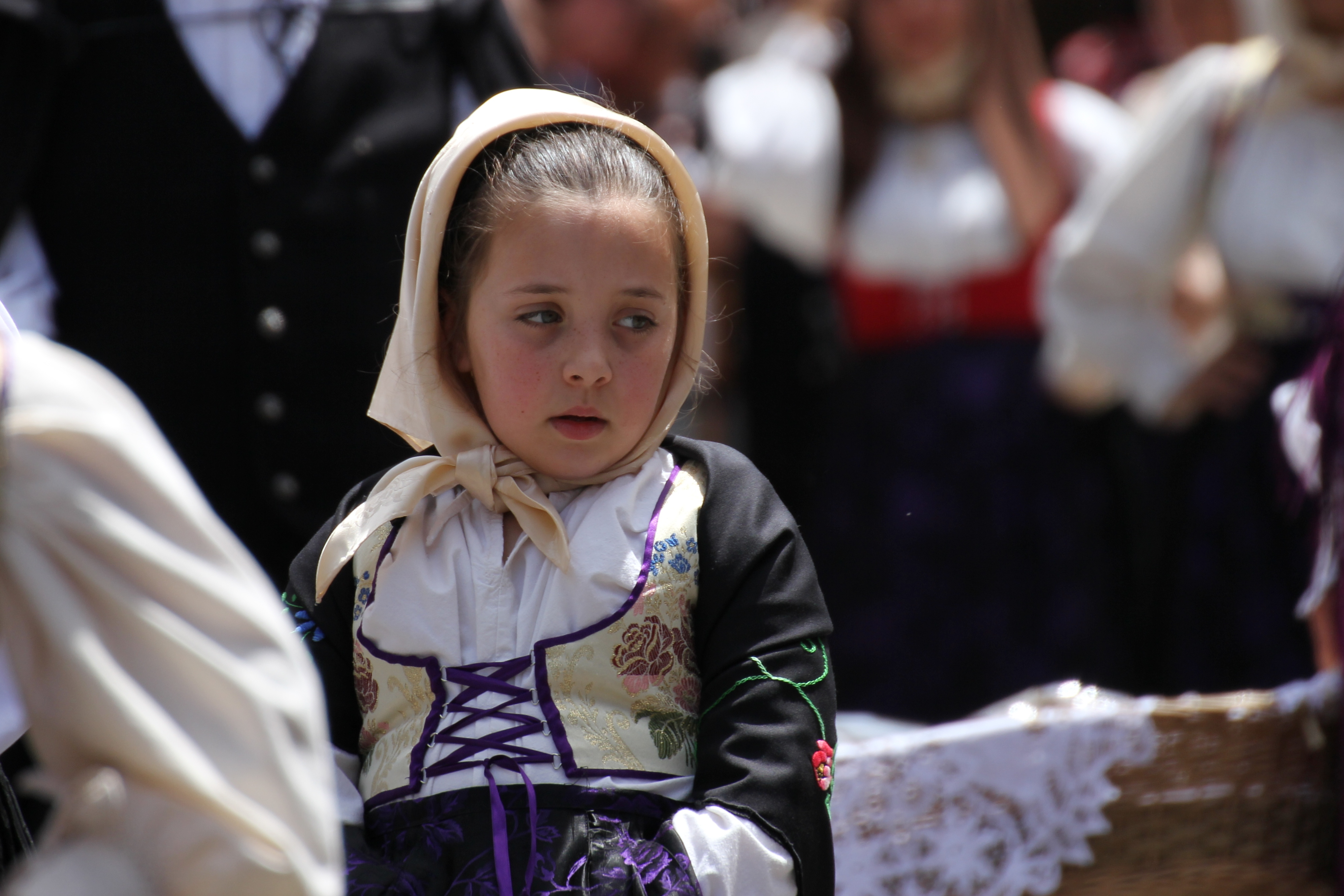
Traditional costume

Several annual festivals and events take place in Arbus, primarily during the summer months. These gatherings feature folkloric activities that preserve local traditions and attract visitors from neighboring municipalities and across Sardinia. Notable annual events include:

- Saint Anthony's Festival (Festa di sant'Antonio), which is arguably considered to be the most important festival organised in Arbus, takes place every year in June and lasts for 4 days (from the first Saturday after Jun 13th to the following Tuesday). During this festival a 33.6 kilometre parade and pilgrimage takes place, in which traditional carts towed by usually two oxen participate.
- Saint Luxurious' Festival, which usually takes place in August.
- Black Sheep, Goat, Sea Urchin and Heifer Fairs, which usually take place during the summer, in which tourists as well as locals can try such tasty and traditional ingredients. During the festival other activities, such as workshops for the purpose of preserving wildlife in town, are usually organised. On the other hand, when it comes to the Heifer Fair, since it usually takes place at the beginning of August, it is also known as "Expats' Fair" because many former Arbus inhabitants come back in town during their vacations from overseas in that period and usually enjoy, after a so long time, such a traditional cuisine.

== Townscape ==
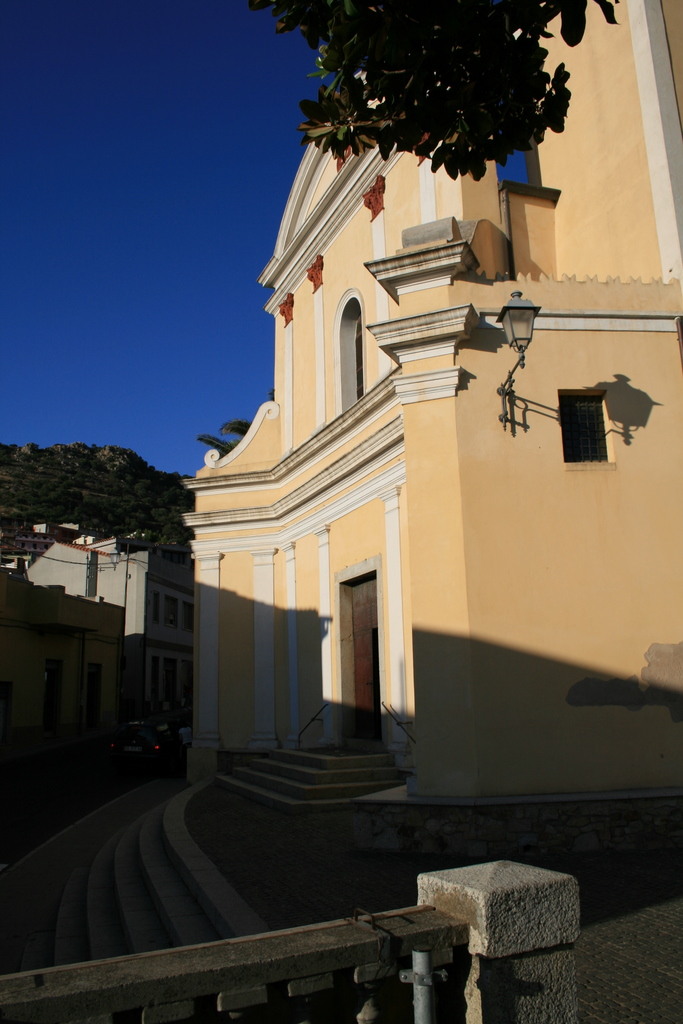
Façade of Saint Sebastian's Church

Arbus' townscape is characterised by a variety of styles of architecture, especially since the town centre was renovated many times over the years, making it really variegated and peculiar in its appearance.

=== Parish Church of Saint Sebastian ===
The parish church, named after Saint Sebastian, who is also patron saint of the town, is located in the town centre and the first documentary evidence of its existence dates back to the end of the 16th century, although it probably has older origins. Its main structure is rather modest and its current architectural lines cannot be associated with any specific style since the building was built, enlarged and renovated in different periods.

The current appearance of the church façade appears in this way thanks to the restorations it went through in the 1800s that led to its raising and decoration through its cornices, columns and capitals. Inside, the presbytery is covered by a balustrade built by Battista Spazzi around 1770, the main altar, built by Fiaschi, dates back to 1845, while the central and only nave of the church opens to many different chapels, among which deserves a mention, for its peculiarity, the one dedicated to Our Lady of Lourdes.

=== Church of Saint Luxurious ===
The church was located in the historic centre of the town within a square also named after the saint himself. The erection, which originally dated back to the Roman period, was dismantled by the municipality administration in 1956 during the construction of the square: thus, presently only some ruins are visible. The building was named after Saint Luxurious, a deserter of the army who, for this reason, was caught in the countryside of the town, imprisoned, tortured and eventually executed in Cagliari, his city of birth.

The church was rather modest in size, with a length of 15 meters, a depth of 6 meters and a ribbed bell tower in the front. At the back, there was instead a circular apse.

When it comes to the history of the church, according to some sources, it could have been constructed even prior to the Parish Church of Saint Sebastian, even though this thesis is not currently sustained by any documentary evidence, so much so that, if this supposition was true, the president of the Sardinian Arts and Crafts Guild responsible for the parish of Saint Luxurious would have had to pay a certain amount of money as a contribution for the works in the parish of Saint Sebastian at the time of the celebrations organised on the 21 August. On the other hand, albeit several presidents of other branches of the Sardinian Arts and Crafts Guild, such as the ones responsible for Saint Michael and Saint Domnius parishes, deposited the fee, no contributors are listed for the supposedly already established parish of Saint Luxurious.

The church was particularly famous for Saint Luxurious’ Festival that, celebrated on 21 August, retained a certain degree of importance for the entire Arbusian population. As a matter of fact, the festival was held exactly in the period in which it was generally time to sign or terminate contracts, pay debts and purchase most commodities. At the time of the celebration, the market in town was literally swarm with stalls and any sort of good could be easily purchased. Due to the importance of the celebration, and the fact that most goods were paid on the occasion of the festival, the Sardinian expression “a pagai a Santu Luxori!”, meaning that something is to be paid in the future (literally during the celebration), entered the common idiom.

=== Montegranatico ===
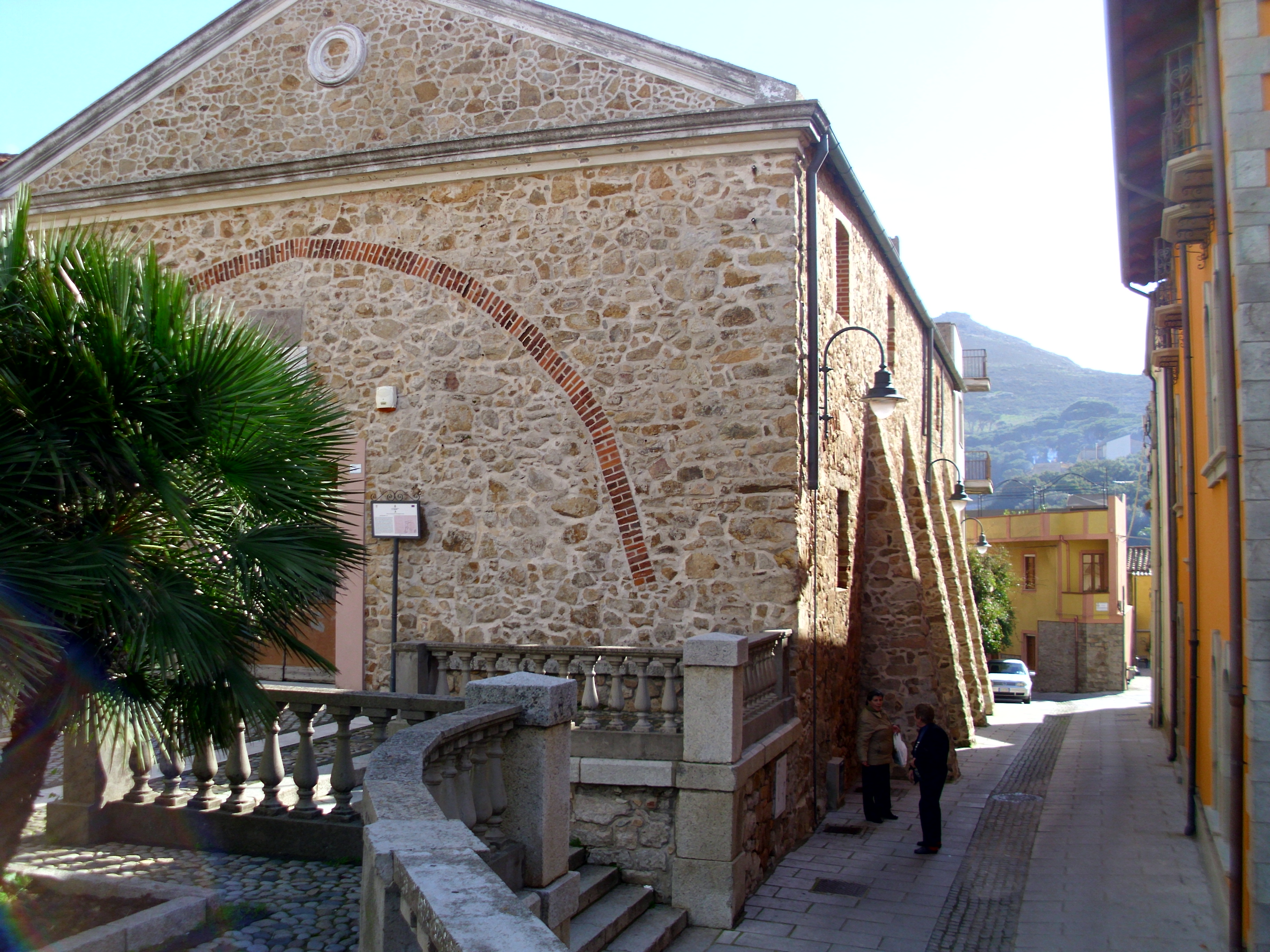
The former Montegranatico

The former Montegranatico (literally 'Wheat Mount'), a communal granary located in Piazza Immacolata, in the town centre, still retains a significant degree of historic and moral importance for the Arbusian population. Despite its not being used for its original purpose, at the turn of the century it was repurposed into a venue for fairs, religious and pagan celebrations and other events organised by the municipality.

In past centuries, the Montegranatico acted as a sort of bank in which wheat could be deposited: it lent wheat to farmers, who would return it after the harvest. Its main purpose was to guarantee that wheat was available for sowing. Although there had been such institutions in Italy since the end of the 15th century, in Sardinia they were introduced during Spanish rule in 1624, when the Sardinian parliament asked vice-king Vives to establish them to tackle increasing usury that was particularly detrimental to the poorest farmers. In spite of that, the interest rate reached 200%. These institutions were expanded after the Spanish period thanks to the intervention of the Ales Diocese and bishop Michele Beltran. Similar institutions, called Monti Nummari, were also founded to provide credit for farmers and breeders to purchase animals and tools.

In 1927 Montegranatico was turned into a Municipal Agricultural Credit Bank (Cassa Comunale di Credito agrario), which effectively continued the lending of wheat to farmers until the end of the 1960s. In 1953 the Credit Bank merged with Banco di Sardegna. In 1989 the building was refurbished, having been purchased by the municipality.

== Main sights ==
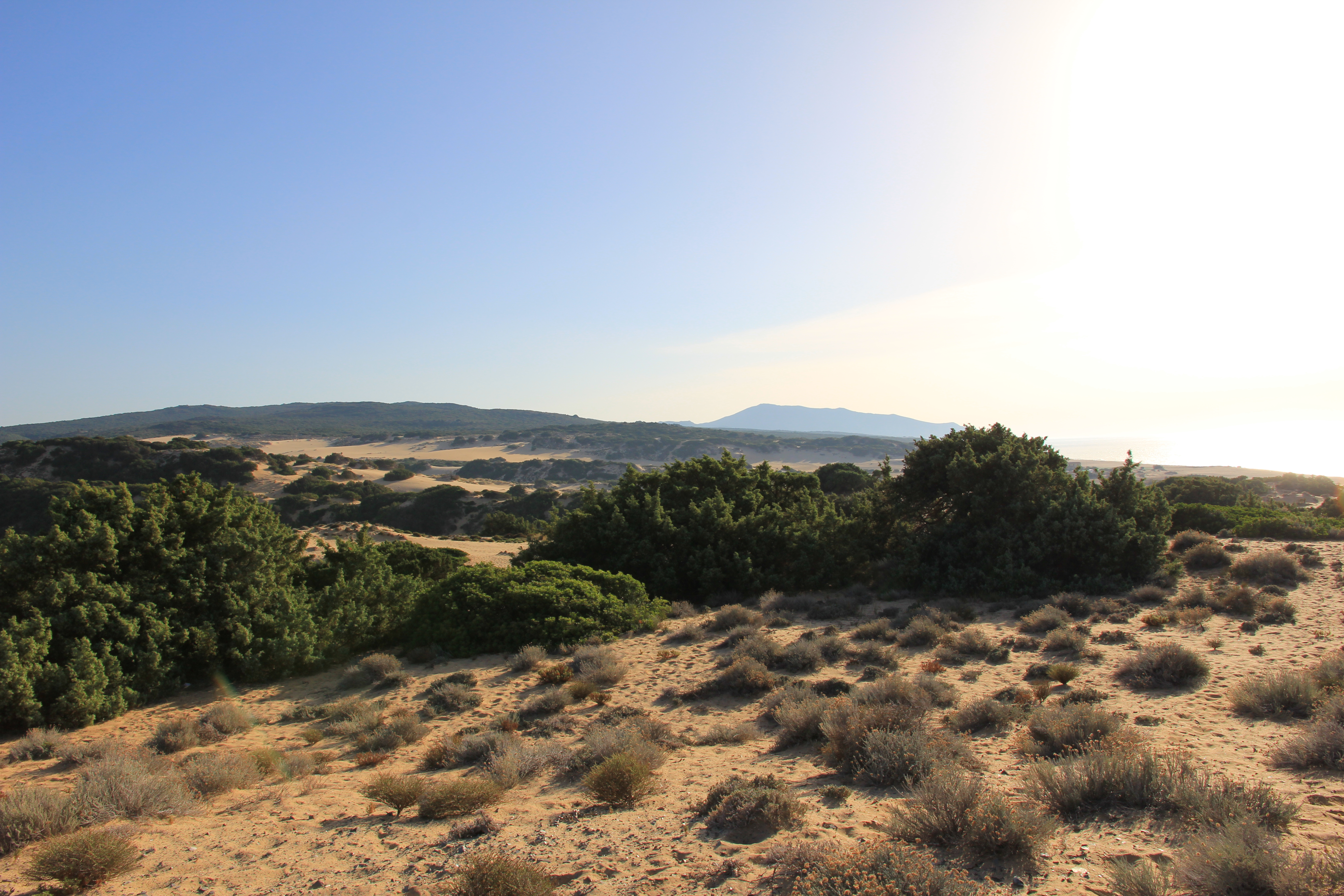
Dunes at Piscinas

Main sights of Arbus include:

- Monte Granatico
- Church of the Beata Vergine d'Itria
- Church of San Sebastiano
- Church of Sant'Antonio di Santadi
- Monte Arcuentu

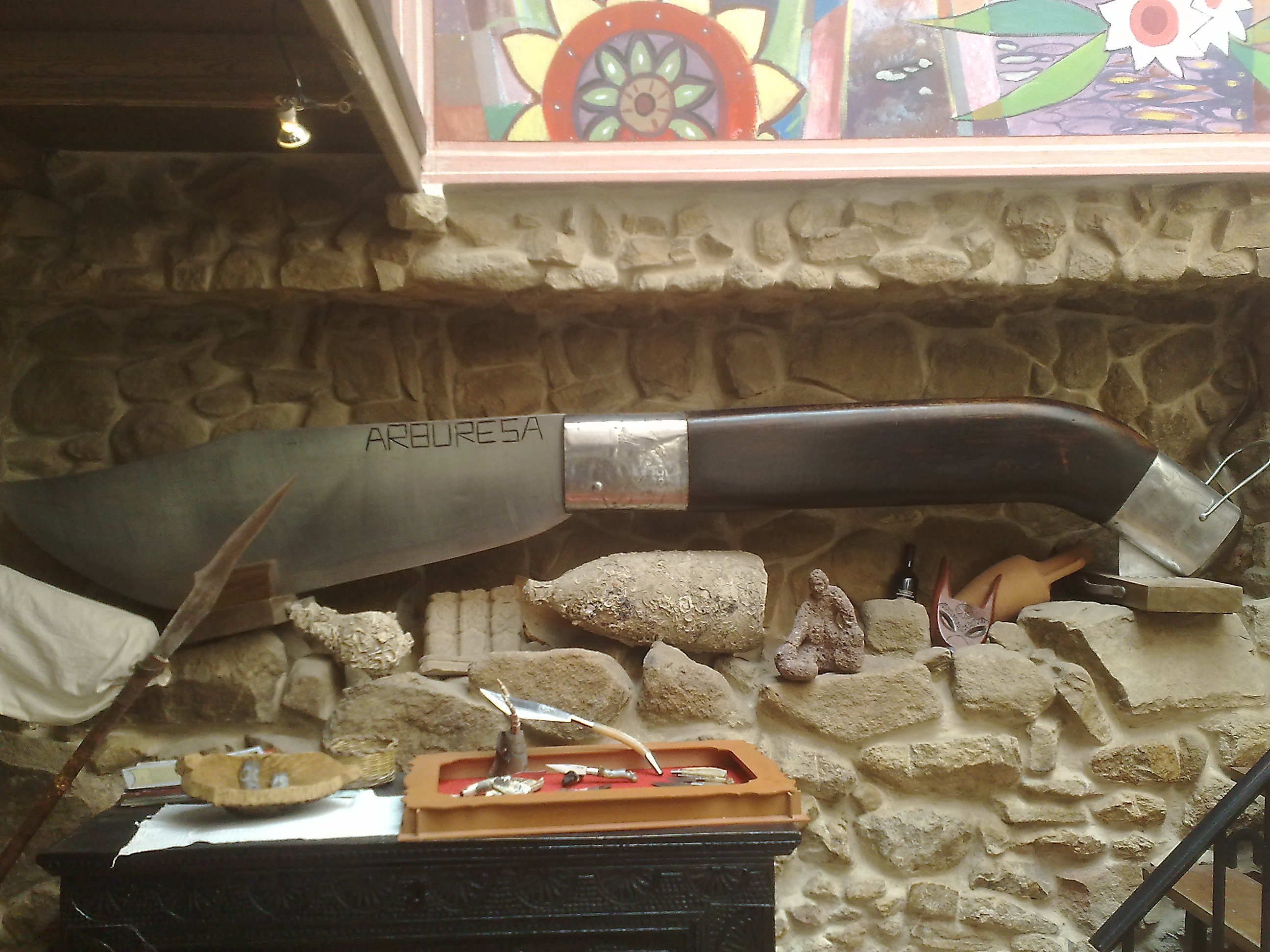
Sardinian Knife Museum in Arbus

In the town's territory, other important touristic attractions are the following:

- Sardinian Knife Museum
- Montevecchio Mineral Museum (Museo mineralogico di Montevecchio)
- Ingurtosu Pozzo Gal Multimedia Museum (Museo Multimediale di Pozzo Gal ad Ingurtosu)
- Sanna-Castoldi Collection Museum (Museo Collezione "Sanna-Castoldi"), in Montevecchio
- Diorama Museum (Museo dei diorami), in Montevecchio

== Tourism ==
According to the figures provided by the Tourism, Handcraft and Trade Division of the Autonomous Region of Sardinia relating to 2019, 52.4% of tourists arrived in town came from foreign countries (from Europe and further afield) while 47.6% came from Italy. More specifically, Arbus recorded 10,070 arrivals from abroad and 9,138 arrivals from Italian peninsula. In particular, foreign tourists came from the following countries as shown in the chart below:

Country of origin	Arrivals in town
Germany	3335
France	2062
Switzerland (which includes Liechtenstein)	1508
Austria	501
Netherlands	446
United Kingdom (UK)	385
Spain	321
Belgium	265
United States of America (USA)	203
Canada	76
Australia	53

When it comes to arrivals of foreign tourists, Arbus is a popular destination in the Medio Campidano plane and its corresponding ex-province in terms of number of foreign tourist arrivals.

== Infrastructure ==
=== Transport and main roads ===
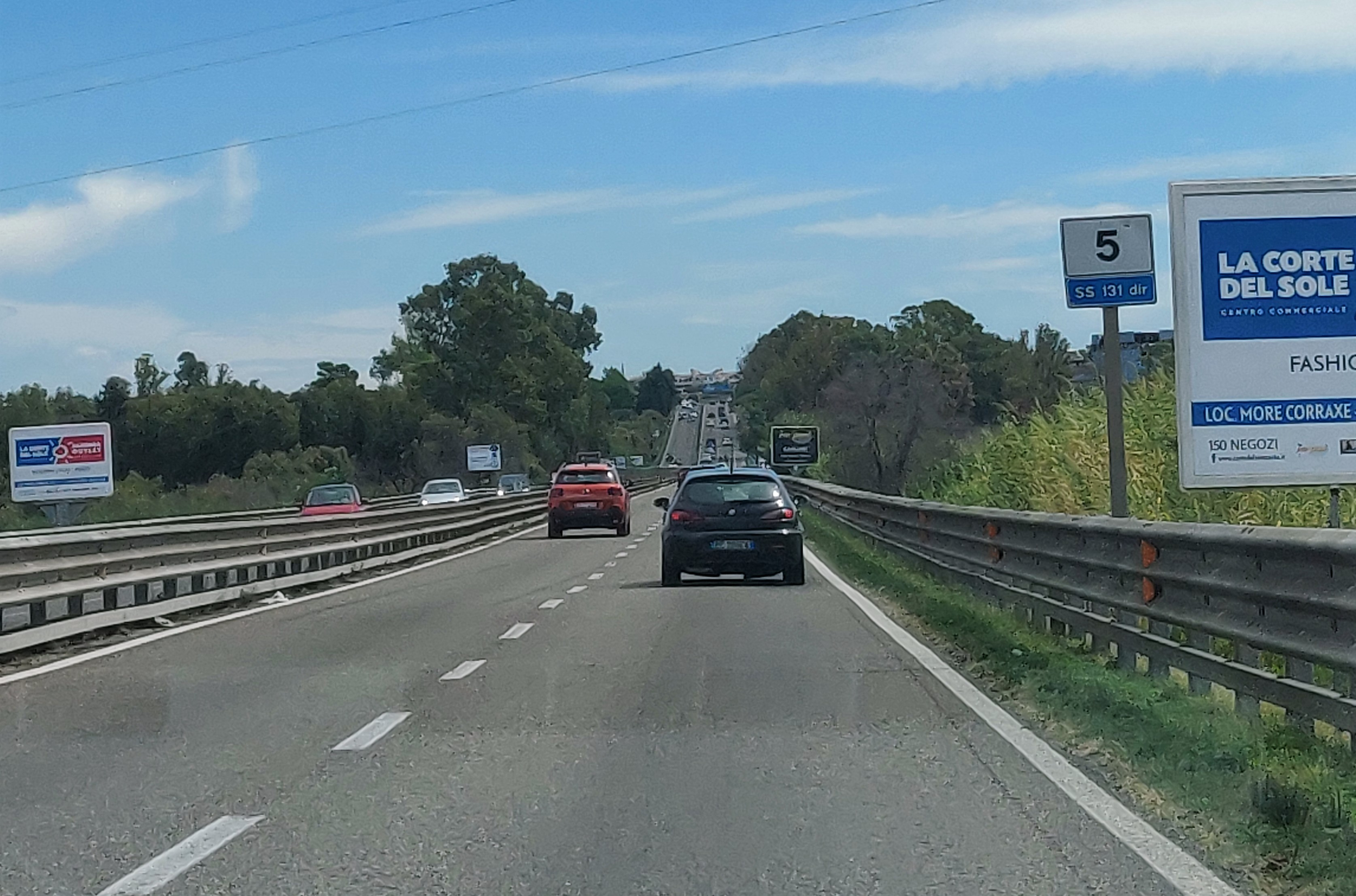
The SS131 Charles Felix state road

When it comes to transportation facilities, although Arbus has neither a train station, a port nor airport, it is well linked with the other adjacent towns through State and Provincial Roads (respectively SS and SP). More specifically, SS126, that goes through the whole town, links it with Guspini, which is roughly 6 kilometres far, and, on the other side, with Fluminimaggiore, while SP4 links it with Gonnosfadaniga, letting Arbusians reach Villacidro, San Gavino Monreale (that can also be accessed through Guspini) and consequently Sanluri and the SS131, the most important Sardinian highway that leads to Cagliari, capital city of the Autonomous Region of Sardinia.

=== Public transport ===
Public means of transport available in Arbus are thoroughly operated by the Sardinian Regional Transportation Company (ARST) that offers to residents a variety of daily bus routes to the nearest towns as well as to the most important Sardinian cities such as Cagliari. Furthermore, during the summer, specific routes to touristically relevant locations in Arbus' coast are usually activated. Moreover, those students who, from Arbus, wish to reach their Senior High Schools based elsewhere, are usually provided with specific students' routes that are usually offered in accordance with the regional academic year schedule issued yearly.

=== Train station ===
The closest train station is located in San Gavino Monreale, which offers hourly train routes to Sassari, Oristano and Cagliari. The service is provided and operated by Trenitalia, an important Italian railway company.

=== Airport ===
The closest airport is located in Cagliari, or rather in Elmas, i.e. Cagliari-Elmas International Airport, major air transportation gateway to national (such as Rome, Florence, Milan, Venice, Turin, etc...) and international destinations (such as Paris, Madrid, Berlin, London, Marseille, Brussels, Porto, Moscow, Athens, Malta, etc...) which is around 60 kilometres far from Arbus, i.e. about 1 hour by car.

== Government ==
=== Town's mayors (since 1946) ===
The following table shows both current and former mayors of Arbus, as well as their party (if it does apply), their term start and end date and further specificities about their role:

Mayor's full name	Term started (in)	Term ended (in)	Party	Role	Source
Alberto Cadeddu	1946	1952	-	Mayor	
Sebastiano Zanda	1952	1956	-	Mayor	
Francesco Zurrida	1956	1960	-	Mayor	
Antonio Mario Lampis	1960	1963	-	Mayor	
Antonio Collu	1963	1964	-	Mayor	
Francesco Zurrida	1964	1975	-	Mayor	
Giovanni Atzeni	1975	1985	Italian Communist Party (Partito Comunista Italiano)	Mayor	
Bachisio Virdis	1985	1990	Italian Socialist Party (Partito Socialista Italiano)	Mayor	
Giancarlo Pusceddu	1990	2000	Italian Communist Party (Partito Comunista Italiano)	Mayor	
Antonio Dessì	2000	2004	-	Mayor	
Andreina Farris	2004	2005	-	Prefecture Commissar	
Raimondo Angius	2005	2010	Democratic Party (Partito Democratico)	Mayor	
Francesco Atzori	2010	2015	-	Mayor	
Antonio Ecca (known as Antonello)	2015	2020	-	Mayor	
Andrea Concas	2020	2022	-	Mayor	
Francesco Cicero	2022	2022	-	Prefecture Commissar	
Paolo Salis	2022	Present	-	Mayor	

=== Institutional relations with surrounding territory ===
Regional law no. 2, issued on February 4, 2016, and concerning primarily the reorganisation of Sardinian local municipal authorities, ruled the abolition of the Province of Middle Campidano of which the Municipality of Arbus was part. In addition to that, the above-mentioned law also stated that each municipality would be obliged to become part of a municipality federation (de jure, Unione di Comuni). Hence, in response to this obligation, the Municipality of Arbus founded the “Monte Linas – Dune di Piscinas” Municipality Federation that also included the Municipalities of Gonnosfanadiga, Guspini and Villacidro. This municipality federation, as of 31 December 2015, encompassed 39,125 inhabitants spread out in a territory of 752.46 kilometres squared. The federation's legal head office was located in Guspini within the municipal offices.

The same municipalities are also part of ATO Linas, one of the 37 Optimal Territorial Settings (Ambiti Territoriali Ottimali or ATO) in which the Region of Sardinia is divided. These municipalities, along with the municipalities of Pabillonis, San Gavino Monreale and Sardara, also make for the Unitary Local Service Plan (Piano Locale Unitario dei Servizi or PLUS) pertaining to Guspini’s district, through which they join efforts to support people with both social and health integrated service. They are also part of a Social District for Public Health Service (Distretto Socio Sanitario) which is directly coordinated, at the present time, by the Regional Health Protection Agency (Azienda per la Tutela della Salute or ATS).

== Notable people ==
- Pietro Leo (Arbus, 1766 - Paris, 1805), Professor of Anatomy and Medicine at the University of Cagliari (UNICA), who introduced the first vaccination techniques against malaria in Sardinia, thanks to the experience and in-depth knowledge he had acquired during his experiences abroad, in particular in Paris during the French Revolution. Furthermore, his efforts to introduce such innovative procedures in Sardinia can also prove his involvement not only, when it comes to this medicine revolutionary wave, strictly in science but also in politics.

== See also ==
- Costa Verde
- Montevecchio
- Province of Medio Campidano

== Sources ==
- Angei, Luca, Arbus tra storia e leggenda. Usanze e vita di un popolo, Cesmet, Napoli, 1995
- Caddeo, Antonello, Arbus. Immagini e ricordi dal passato, Editar, Cagliari, 1994
- Concas, Luciano, Arbus, coste incantate e fondali da sogno, Garau, Guspini 2007
- Concas, Luciano, Arbus, le sue coste e i suoi fondali, Garau, Guspini 2003
- Mostallino Murgia, Costa Verde. Da Capo Frasca a Cala Domestica. La costa e l'interno, Zonza, Cagliari, 2005
- Piras, Aldo, Pietro Leo e Raimondo Garau. Tempi e luoghi, Garau, Guspini, 2003
