= Guspini =

Guspini Gùspini (Sardinian)
- Comune
- Comune di Guspini
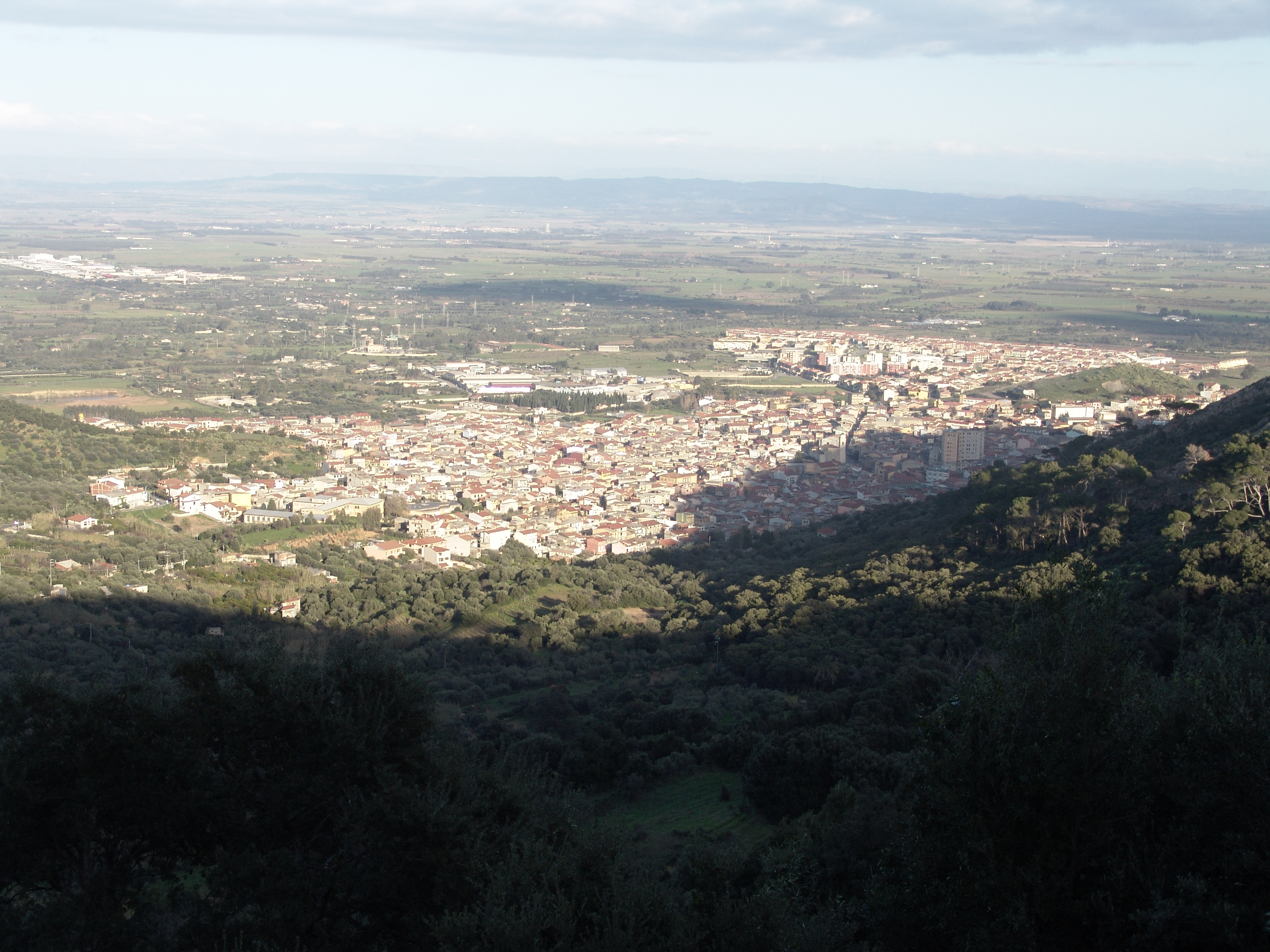
- View of Guspini

- Coat of arms

- Location within Sardinia
- Coordinates: 39°32′N 8°38′E
- Country: Italy
- Region: Sardinia
- Province: Medio Campidano
- Frazioni: Montevecchio, Sa Zeppara

Government
  - Mayor: Marco Pala

Area
  - Total: 174.67 km^{2} (67.44 sq mi)
- Elevation: 126 m (413 ft)

Population (2026)
  - Total: 10,563
  - Density: 60.474/km^{2} (156.63/sq mi)
- Demonym: Guspinesi
- Time zone: UTC+1 (CET)
  - Summer (DST): UTC+2 (CEST)
- Postal code: 09036
- Dialing code: 070
- Patron saint: St. Nicholas of Myra
- Saint day: December 6
- Website: Official website

Guspini (Sardinian: Gùspini) is a town and comune (municipality) in the province of Medio Campidano in the autonomous island region of Sardinia in Italy. It is located 62 kilometres (39 mi) from the capital Cagliari and 14.6 kilometres (9.1 mi) from the railway station at San Gavino Monreale. It has 10,563 inhabitants.

Close to Guspini, at the mines of Montevecchio and Gennamari, galena and sphalerite were extracted in the past. Today the people at Guspini are concentrated on agriculture, on tourism and on smaller to middle enterprises. Close to Guspini are some well-built nuraghes and the Phoenician-Punic archaeological site of Neapolis.

Guspini borders the municipalities of Arbus, Gonnosfanadiga, Pabillonis, San Nicolò d'Arcidano, and Terralba.

== History ==
The first traces of human settlement in the area of Guspini trace back to prior the Nuragic period. Traces of Nuragic, Phoenician-Punic, Bizantine and Roman settlements have been found.

The town has a medieval structure with the Church of Santa Maria of Malta which was founded by the knights of the same order, as the most ancient trace. In the Middle Ages the town was part of the Giudicato of Arborea, whose rulers possessed a castle on a nearby mount built in 1100, on the Mount Arcuentu.

From the 19th century Guspini's history was strictly linked to the mines of Montevecchio.

== Demographics ==
As of 2026, the population is 10,563, of which 49.4% are male, and 50.6% are female. Minors make up 11.6% of the population, and seniors make up 30.6%.

Historical population

| Year | Pop. | ±% |
|---|---|---|
| 1861 | 4,799 | — |
| 1871 | 5,357 | +11.6% |
| 1881 | 6,351 | +18.6% |
| 1901 | 6,946 | +9.4% |
| 1911 | 7,889 | +13.6% |
| 1921 | 7,446 | −5.6% |
| 1931 | 8,435 | +13.3% |
| 1936 | 9,368 | +11.1% |

| Year | Pop. | ±% |
|---|---|---|
| 1951 | 11,744 | +25.4% |
| 1961 | 12,318 | +4.9% |
| 1971 | 12,936 | +5.0% |
| 1981 | 13,539 | +4.7% |
| 1991 | 13,380 | −1.2% |
| 2001 | 12,695 | −5.1% |
| 2011 | 12,272 | −3.3% |
| 2021 | 11,134 | −9.3% |

Source: ISTAT

=== Immigration ===
As of 2025, immigrants make up 2.2% of the population. The 5 largest foreign countries of birth are Romania, Germany, France, China, and Ukraine.

== Sights ==
=== Religious buildings ===
- Church of San Nicola di Mira, built into a late gothic style in the first half of the 17th century. Its facade is characterized by a rose window.
- Church of Santa Maria of Malta, built into romanic style in the 10th century: it was part of a monastery belonging to the Byzantine (Greek) Catholic Church.
- Church of San Pio X, built in 1966.
- Church of San Giovanni Bosco, built in 1977.

=== Civilian buildings ===
- Casa Murgia
- Montegranatico
- Municipio (Town hall)

=== Archeology ===
==== Pre-Nuragic sites ====
- Perdas Longas menhirs.
- Genna Prunas menhir close to the sacred well Sa Mitza de Nieddinu.
- domus de janas di Bruncu Maddeus near the nuraghe Bruncu e s'Orcu.

Nuragic sites

- more than 30 nuraghes such as Nuraghe Saurecci and Nuraghe Melas that are the most well preserved.
- 2 sacred wells:
  - sacred well Sa Mitza de Nieddinu (1.200-900 a.C.)
  - sacred well of Is Trigas.

The other most interesting archeological site is the Phoenician-Punic and later Roman city of Neapolis.

=== Mines ===
- Montevecchio mines.

Among the East mines:

- Piccalinna mine.
- Sant'Antonio mine.
- Sciria mine.

Among the West mines:

- Casargiu mine.
- Sanna mine.
- Telle mine.

=== Natural monuments ===
- Columns of basalt, located inside the town.
- Sa rocca incuaddigada (translatable from the Sardinian as "The mounted rock"); it is a gigantic granitic rock placed on the slope of Mount Santa Margherita where the water springs Sa Tella and Sattai are also.

== See also ==
- Montevecchio
- Arbus
