= Montevecchio =

Coordinates: 39°33′24″N 8°34′14″E

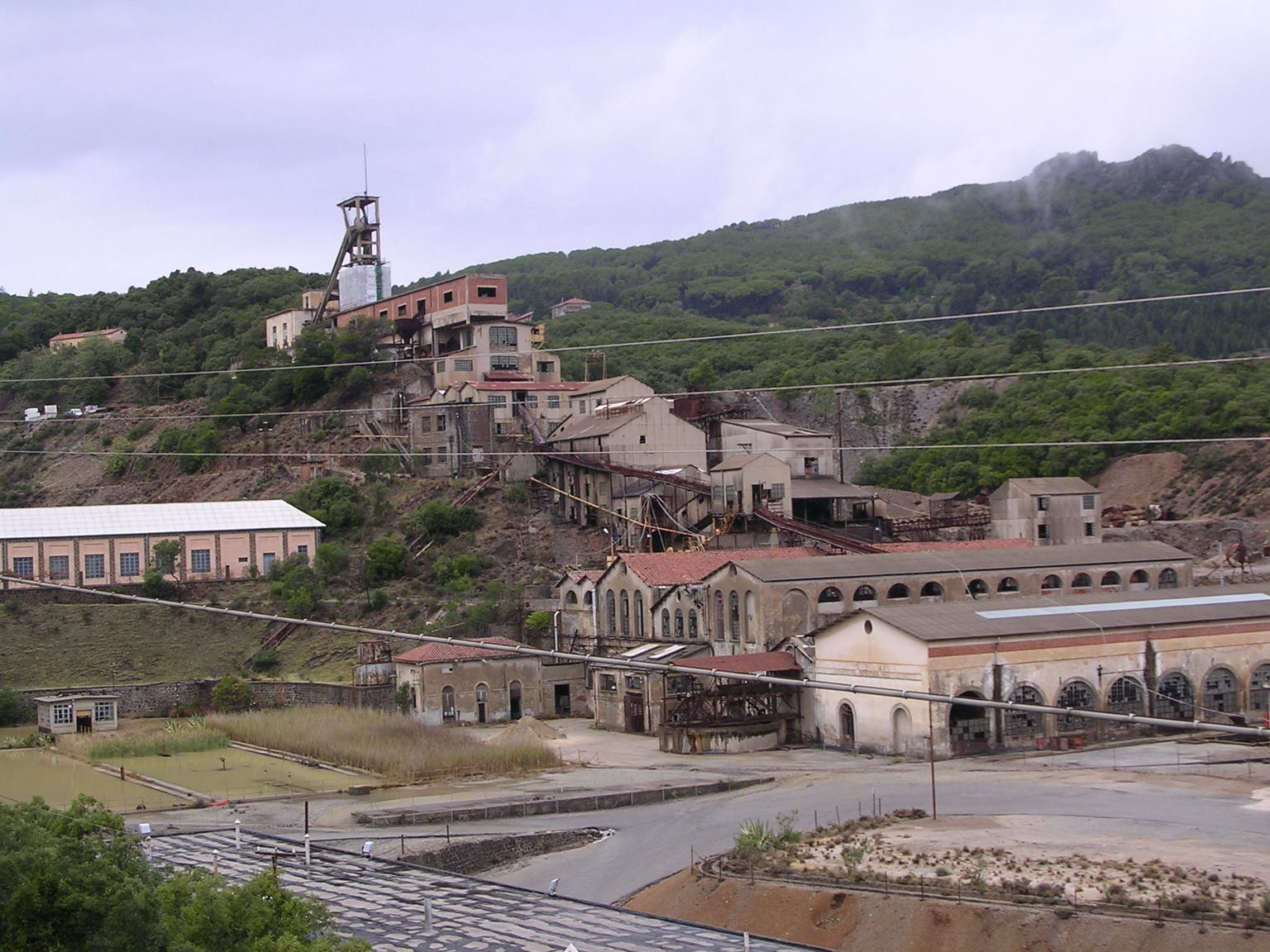
Montevecchio

Montevecchio (Italian: [ˌmonteˈvɛkkjo]; Sardinian: Gennas Serapis), located in the south west of Sardinia, is one of the most ancient mining sites in Italy. Administratively, the village of Montevecchio is a frazione (borough) of the municipality of Guspini, in the Province of South Sardinia, while the mines are situated in the municipalities of both Arbus and Guspini.

== History ==
The extraction of minerals in the area of Montevecchio dates back to the Phoenician and Roman times. In 1842, modern industrial mining activity started in the area, thanks to the arrival of entrepreneurs such as Giovanni Antonio Pischedda and Giovanni Antonio Sanna. Subsequently, the Montecatini company took over the extractive activities. At its height, the mining village was inhabited by more than 3000 people. The mines of Montevecchio stopped their activities in 1991. The mines of Montevecchio are now an important site of industrial archaeology, part of the Parco Geominerario Storico ed Ambientale della Sardegna.

== See also ==
- Costa Verde
