= Sardinia =

Island in the Mediterranean and region of Italy

Native names
- - Italian: Sardegna
  - Sardinian: Sardigna (Note: Dialectal varieties of the Sardinian-language name include Sardìnnia [saɾˈdinːja], Saldigna, Sardìngia, Sardinna, Sardinza.)
  - Gallurese: Saldigna
  - Catalan: Sardenya
  - Ligurian: Sardegna
  - Sassarese: Sardhigna
  - Corsican: Sardegna
- Autonomous region
- Autonomous Region of Sardinia
- Flag Coat of arms Logo
- Anthem: "Su patriotu sardu a sos feudatarios" (Sardinian) (English: "The Sardinian Patriot to the Lords")
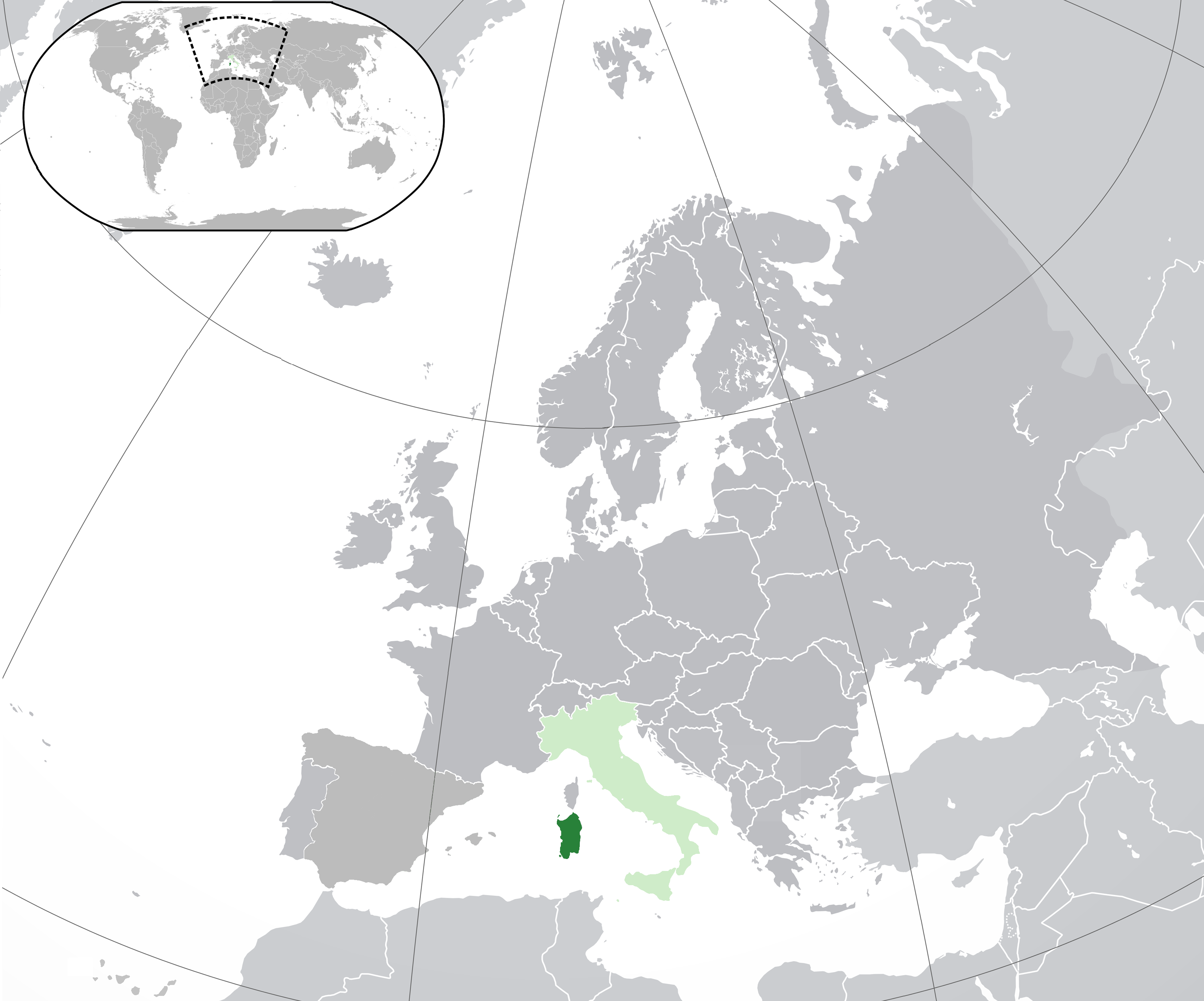
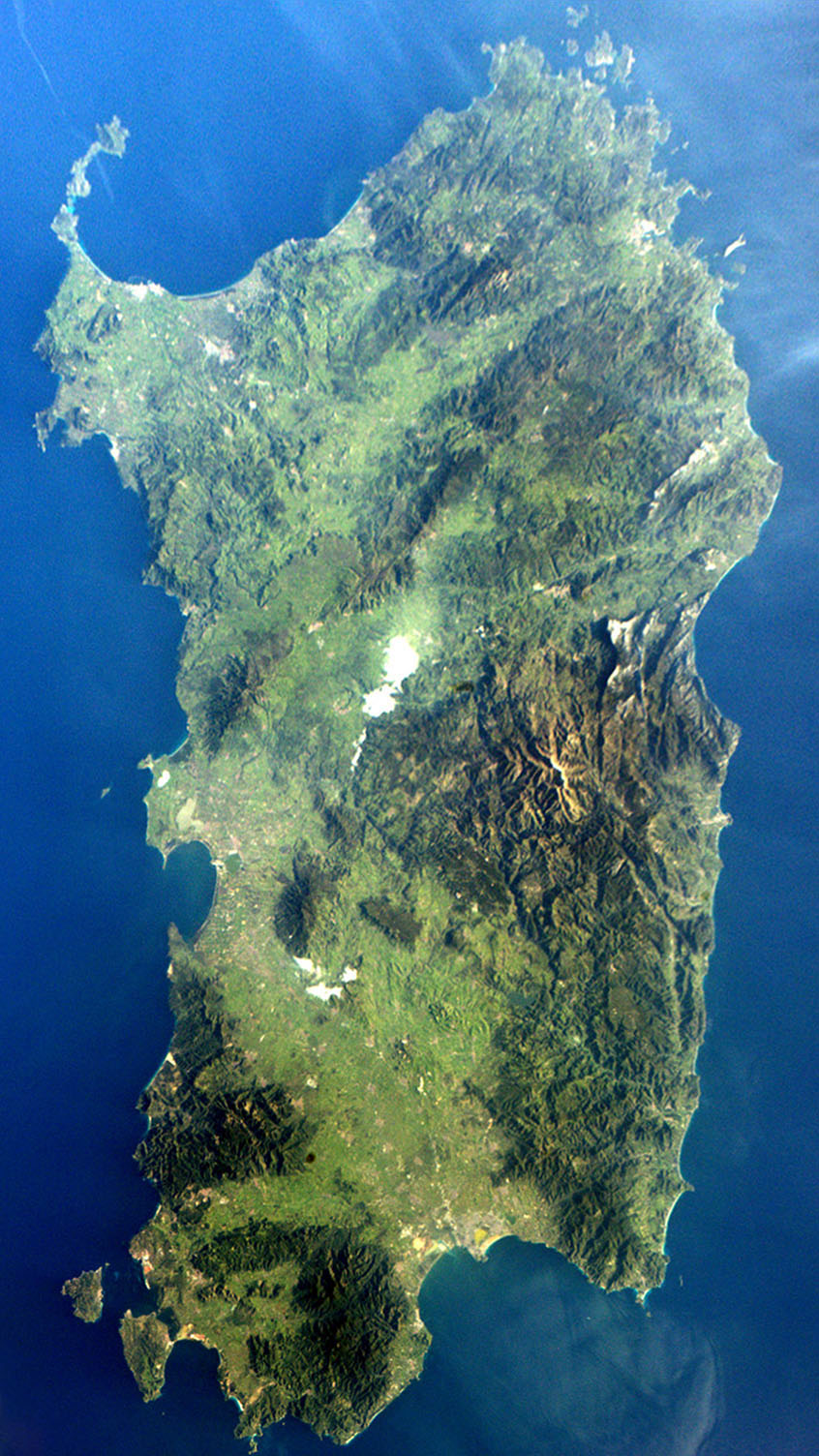
- Coordinates: 40°N 9°E
- Country: Italy
- Capital: Cagliari

Government
  - Type: Presidential
  - President: Alessandra Todde (M5S)

Area
  - Total: 24,100.02 km^{2} (9,305.07 sq mi)

Population (2026)
  - Total: 1,554,490
  - Density: 64.5016/km^{2} (167.058/sq mi)
  - Languages: Italian and Sardinian
  - Minority languages: Sassarese; Gallurese; Ligurian (Tabarchino); Catalan (Algherese)
- Demonyms: English: Sardinian or Sard; Italian: Sardo (man); Italian: Sarda (woman); Sardinian: Sardu (man); Sardinian: Sarda (woman); Catalan: Sard (man); Catalan: Sarda (woman)

Citizenship
  - Italian: 97%

GDP
  - Total: €43.468 billion (2024)
  - Per capita: €27,828 (2024)
- Time zone: UTC+1 (CET)
  - Summer (DST): UTC+2 (CEST)
- ISO 3166 code: IT-88
- HDI (2023): 0.887 very high · 17th of 21
- NUTS Region: ITG
- Website: regione.sardegna.it

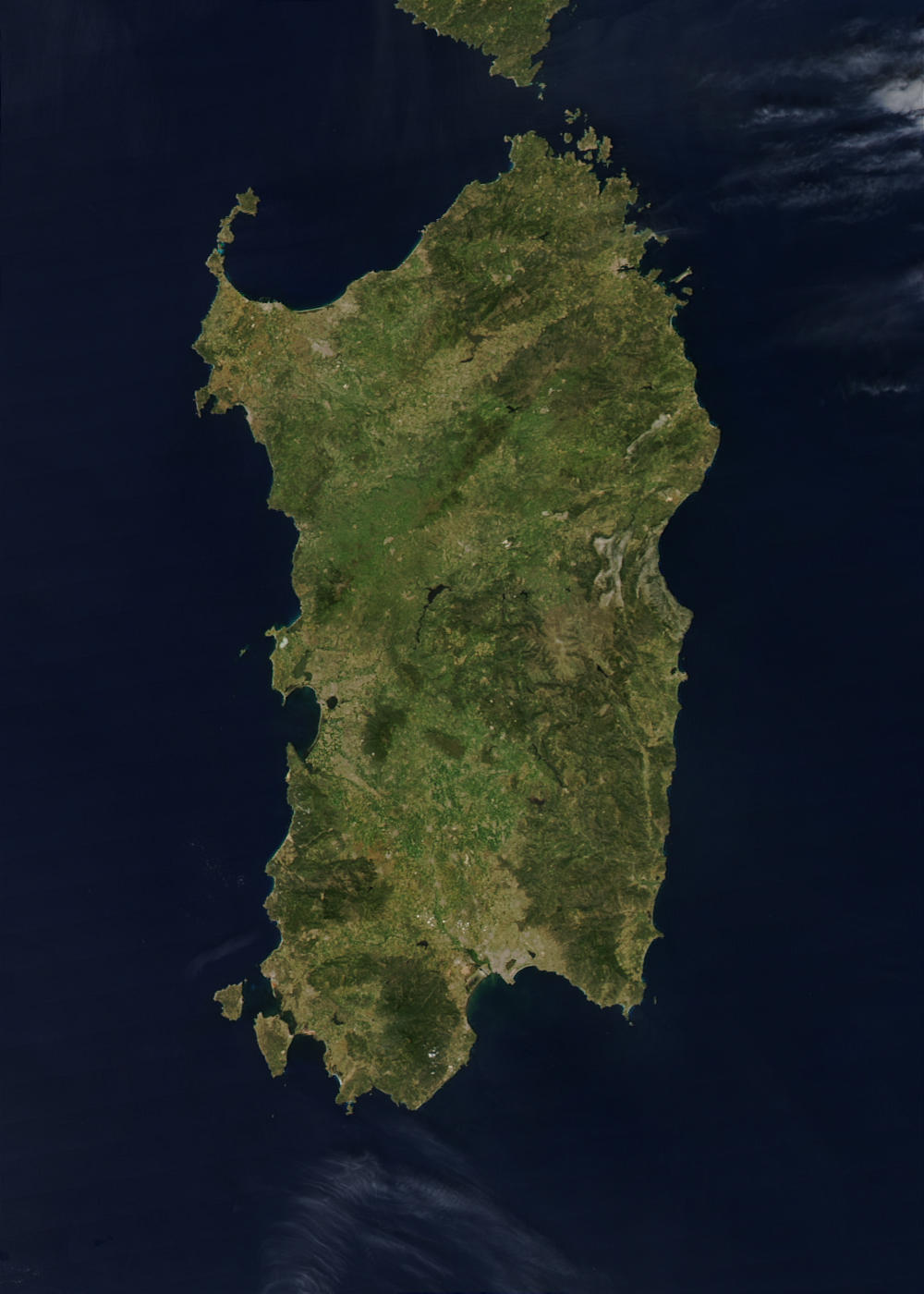
Satellite image of Sardinia, acquired on 27 April 2003 by NASA's Aqua MODIS instrument

Sardinia (/sɑːrˈdɪniə/ sar-DIN-ee-ə; Sardinian: Sardigna [saɾˈdiɲːa]; (Note: Names in other local languages: Tabarchino: Sardegna; Sassarese: Sardhigna; Gallurese: Saldigna; Algherese: Sardenya.) Italian: Sardegna [sarˈdeɲːa]), officially the Autonomous Region of Sardinia, (Note: Italian and Sardinian: Regione Autonoma della Sardegna / Regione Autònoma de Sardigna.) is the second largest island in the Mediterranean Sea after Sicily, and one of the twenty regions of Italy. It is located 200 kilometres (110 nautical miles) west of the Italian Peninsula, 200 km (110 nmi) north of Tunisia, and 16.5 km (9 nmi) south of the French island of Corsica. Sardinia is one of five Italian regions with statutory domestic autonomy. It is divided into six provinces and two metropolitan cities. Cagliari is the capital and largest city, followed by Sassari. Sardinia has over 1.5 million inhabitants as of 2026.

The Sardinian language and the Algherese dialect of Catalan spoken on the island are recognized by both regional and national law as two of Italy's twelve officially protected minority languages, although both are gravely endangered; regional law provides some degree of protection and recognition of the island's other minority languages: the Corsican-influenced Sassarese and Gallurese, and Tabarchino Ligurian.

Owing to its varied ecosystems, which include mountains, woods, plains, streams, rocky coasts, and long sandy beaches, Sardinia has been metaphorically described as a micro-continent. In the modern era, many travelers and writers have extolled the beauty of its long-untouched landscapes, which retain vestiges of the prehistoric Nuragic civilization.

== Etymology ==
The name Sardinia has pre-Latin roots. It comes from the pre-Roman ethnonym *s(a)rd-, later romanised as sardus (feminine sarda). It makes its first appearance on the Phoenician inscription on the Nora Stone, where the word ŠRDN, or *Šardana, testifies to the name's existence when the Phoenician merchants first arrived. There has been speculation that identifies the ancient Nuragic Sards with the Sherden, one of the Sea Peoples. It is suggested that the name had a religious connotation from its use also as the adjective for the ancient Sardinian mythological hero-god Sardus Pater ("Sardinian Father"; a common explanation that the term means "Father of the Sardinians" is incorrect, as that would be "Sardorum Pater"), as well as being the stem of the adjective "sardonic".

In classical antiquity, Sardinia was called a number of names besides Sardṓ (Σαρδώ) or Sardinia, like Ichnusa (the Latinised form of the Greek Ἰχνοῦσσα), Sandaliotis (Σανδαλιῶτις) and Argyrophleps (Αργυρόφλεψ). An anonymous commentary on Plato's dialogue Timaeus suggests that Sardinia (referred to by most ancient Greek authors as Σαρδώ Sardṓ) was named after a legendary woman called Sardṓ (Σαρδώ), born in Sardis, capital of the ancient kingdom of Lydia.

== History ==
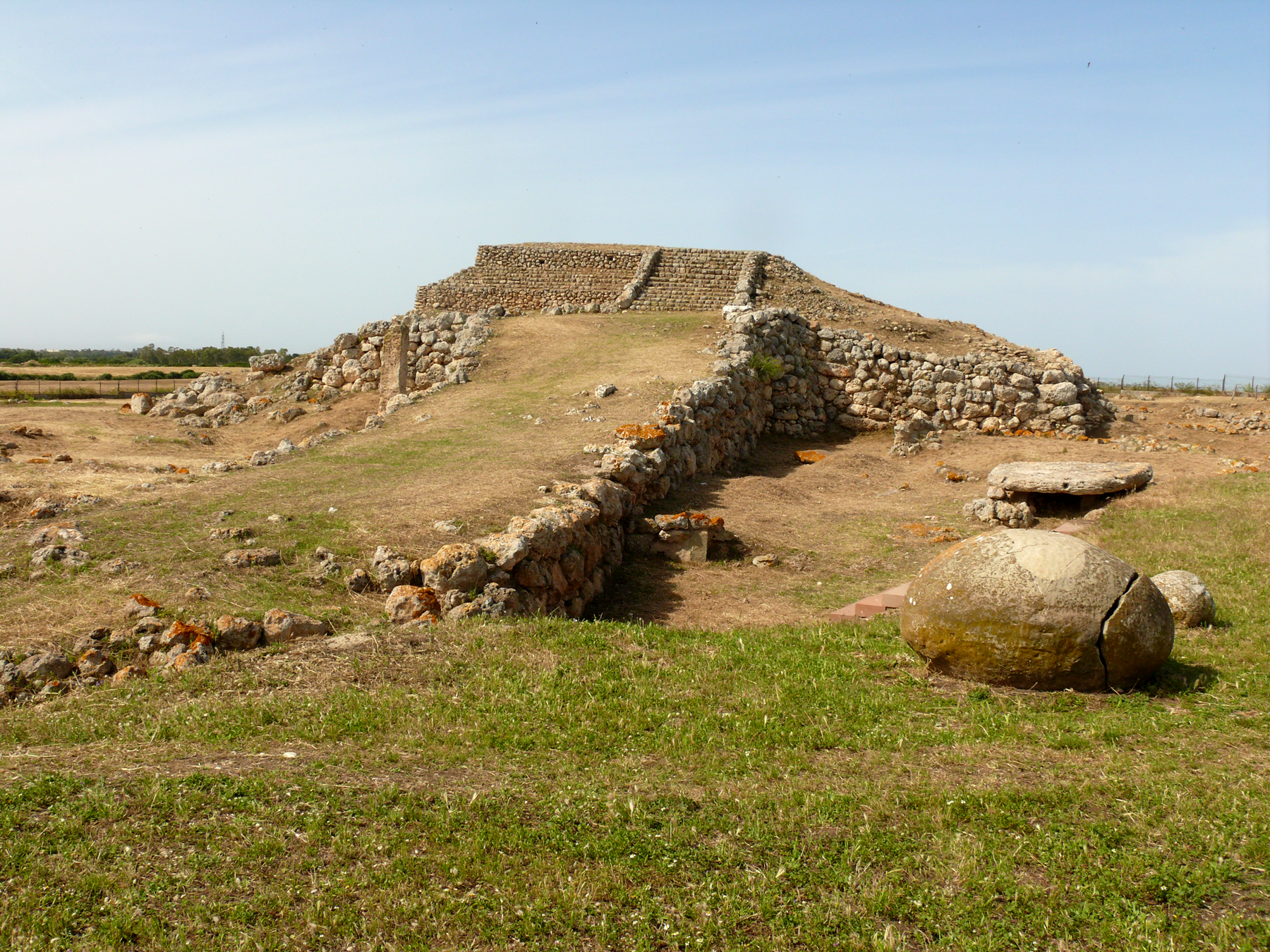
The prehistoric megalithic temple of Monte d'Accoddi

Sardinia has been inhabited by humans since the end of the Paleolithic, around 20–10,000 years ago. The island's most notable historic culture is the Nuragic civilization, which flourished from the 18th century BC to either 238 BC or the 2nd century in some parts of the island, and to the 6th century in that part of the island known as Barbagia.

After a period in which the island was ruled by a political and economic alliance between the Nuragic Sardinians and the Phoenicians, parts of it were conquered by Carthage in the late 6th century BC, and by Rome in 238 BC. The Roman occupation lasted for 700 years.

Beginning in the Early Middle Ages, the island was ruled by the Vandals and the Byzantines. In practice, the island was disconnected from Byzantium's territorial influence, which allowed the Sardinians to provide themselves with a self-ruling political organization, the four kingdoms known as judicates. The maritime republics of the Republic of Pisa and the Republic of Genoa struggled to impose political control over these indigenous kingdoms, but it was the Iberian Crown of Aragon which, in 1324, succeeded in bringing the island under its control, consolidating it into the Kingdom of Sardinia.

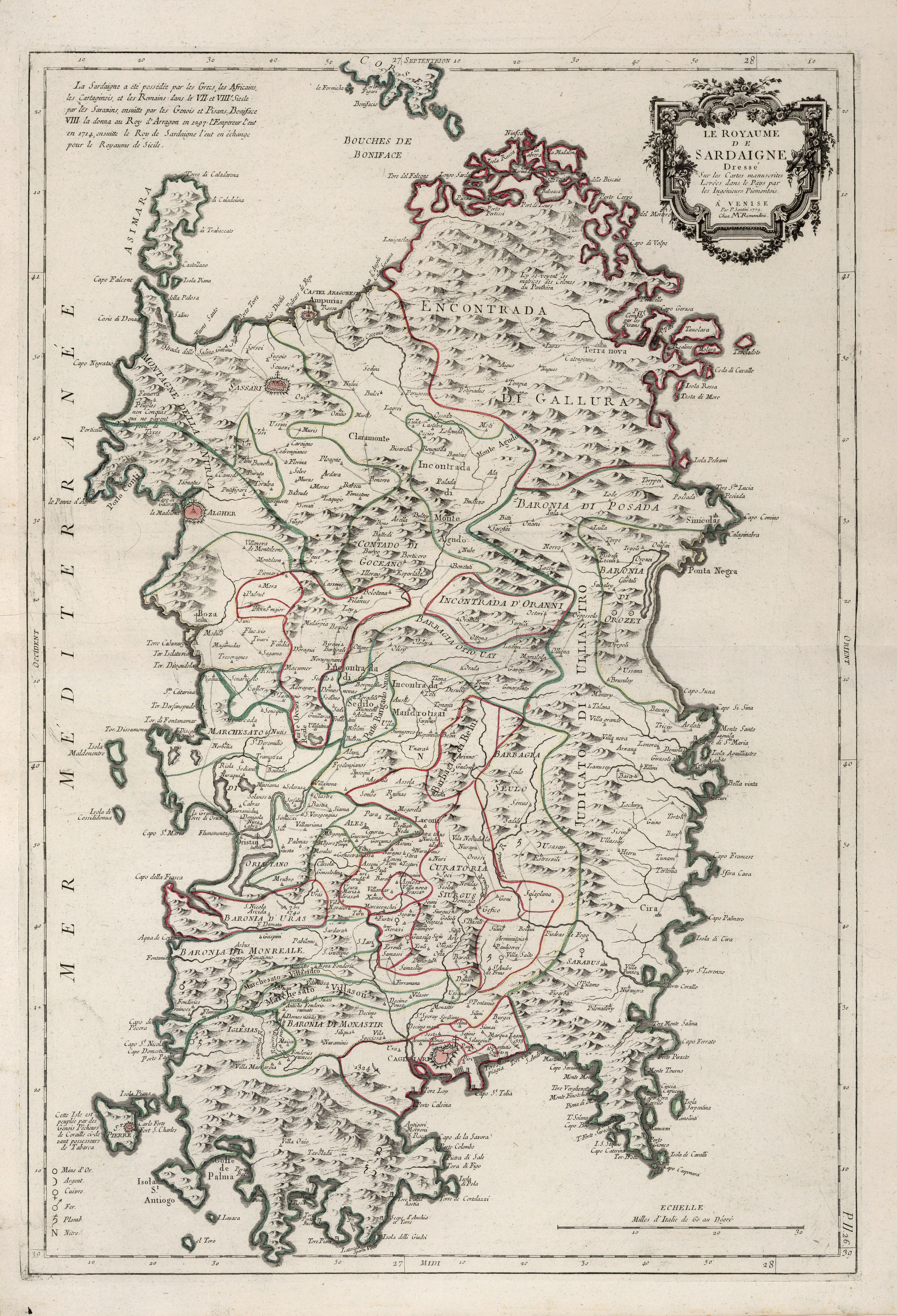
Map of Sardinia, 1779

This Iberian kingdom endured until 1713 and, for the last time, in 1718, when it was ceded to the Alpine House of Savoy; the Savoyards would politically merge their insular possession with their domains on the Italian Mainland which, during the period of Italian unification, they would go on to expand to include the whole Italian peninsula; their territory was so renamed into the Kingdom of Italy in 1861, and it was reconstituted as the present-day Italian Republic in 1946.

=== Prehistory ===
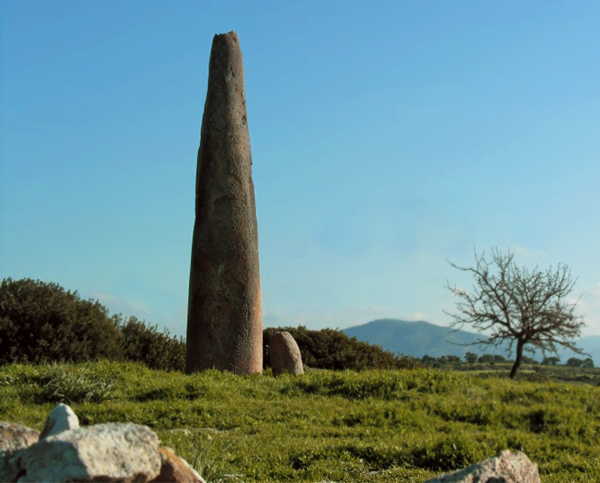
Monte Corru Tundu Menhir in Villa Sant'Antonio (5.75 meters high)

Sardinia is one of the most geologically ancient bodies of land in Europe. The island was populated in various waves of immigration from prehistory until recent times.

Remains from Corbeddu Cave in eastern Sardinia have been suggested by some authors to represent the earliest evidence of human presence on Sardinia, around 20,000 years ago, during the Last Glacial Maximum. However, other authors contend that there is no solid evidence for the occupation of the island until the early Mesolithic, around 10,000 years ago.

The Neolithic began on Sardinia during the 6th millennium BC resulting from the migration of Early European Farmers, replacing the Mesolithic hunter-gatherer populations, with a material culture including the widespread Cardium pottery style. In the mid-Neolithic period, the Ozieri culture, probably of Aegean origin, flourished on the island spreading the hypogeum tombs known as domus de Janas, while the Arzachena culture of Gallura built the first megaliths: circular tombs. In the early 3rd millennium BC, the metallurgy of copper and silver began to develop.

During the late Chalcolithic the so-called Beaker culture, coming from various parts of Continental Europe, appeared in Sardinia. These new people predominantly settled on the west coast, where the majority of the sites attributed to them had been found. The Beaker culture was followed in the early Bronze Age by the Bonnanaro culture which showed both reminiscences of the Beaker and influences by the Polada culture.

As time passed the different Sardinian populations appear to have become united in customs, yet remained politically divided into various small, tribal groupings, at times banding together against invading forces from the sea, and at others waging war against each other. Habitations consisted of round thatched stone huts.

==== Nuragic civilization ====
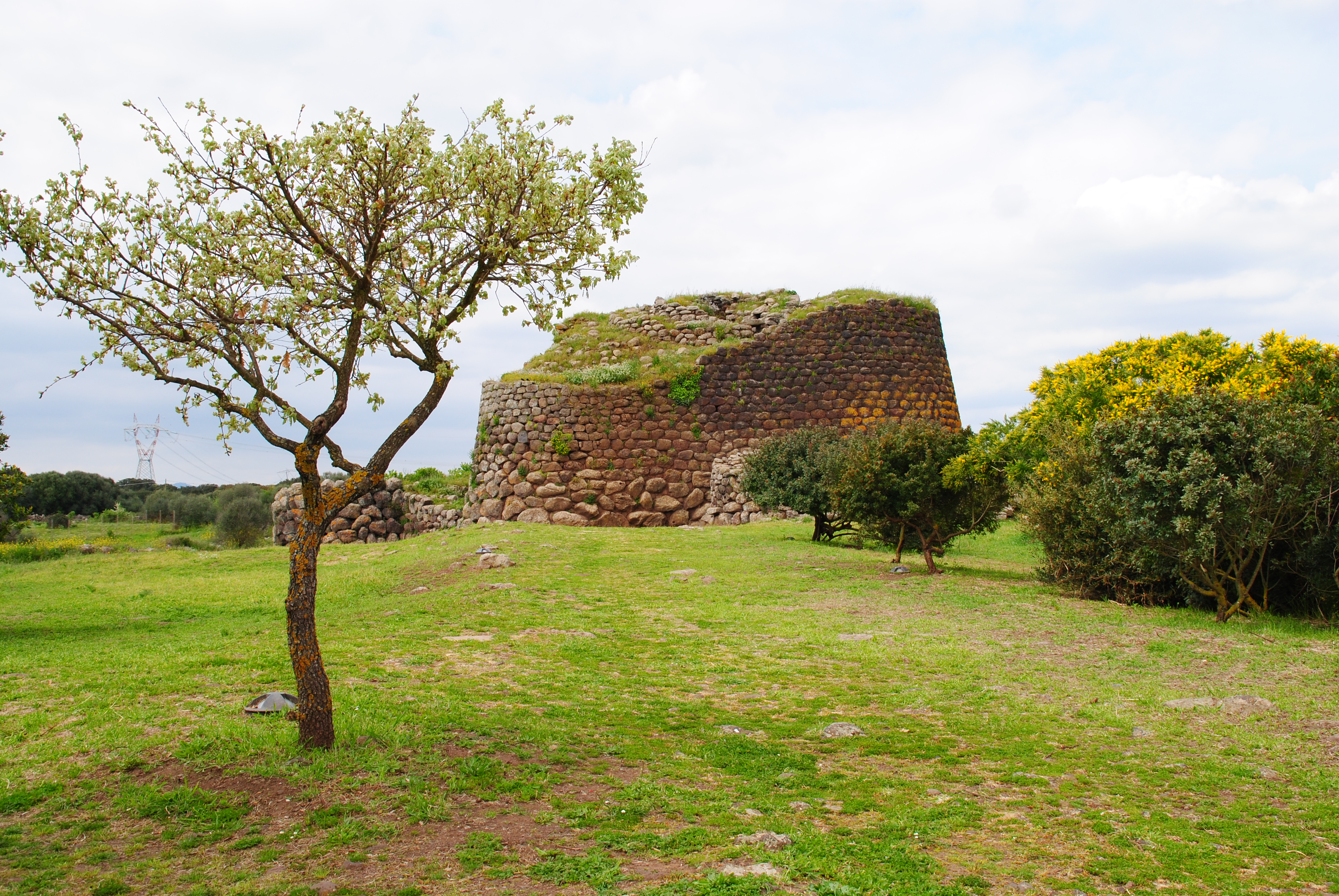
Nuraghe Losa

From about 1500 BC onwards, villages were built around a kind of round tower-fortress called nuraghe (usually pluralized as nuraghes in English and as nuraghi in Italian). These towers were often reinforced and enlarged with battlements. Tribal boundaries were guarded by smaller lookout Nuraghes erected on strategic hills commanding a view of other territories.

Today, some 7,000 Nuraghes dot the Sardinian landscape. While initially these Nuraghes had a relatively simple structure, with time they became extremely complex and monumental (see for example the Nuraghe Santu Antine, Su Nuraxi, or Nuraghe Arrubiu). The scale, complexity and territorial spread of these buildings attest to the level of wealth accumulated by the Nuragic Sardinians, their advances in technology and the complexity of their society, which was able to coordinate large numbers of people with different roles for the purpose of building the monumental Nuraghes.

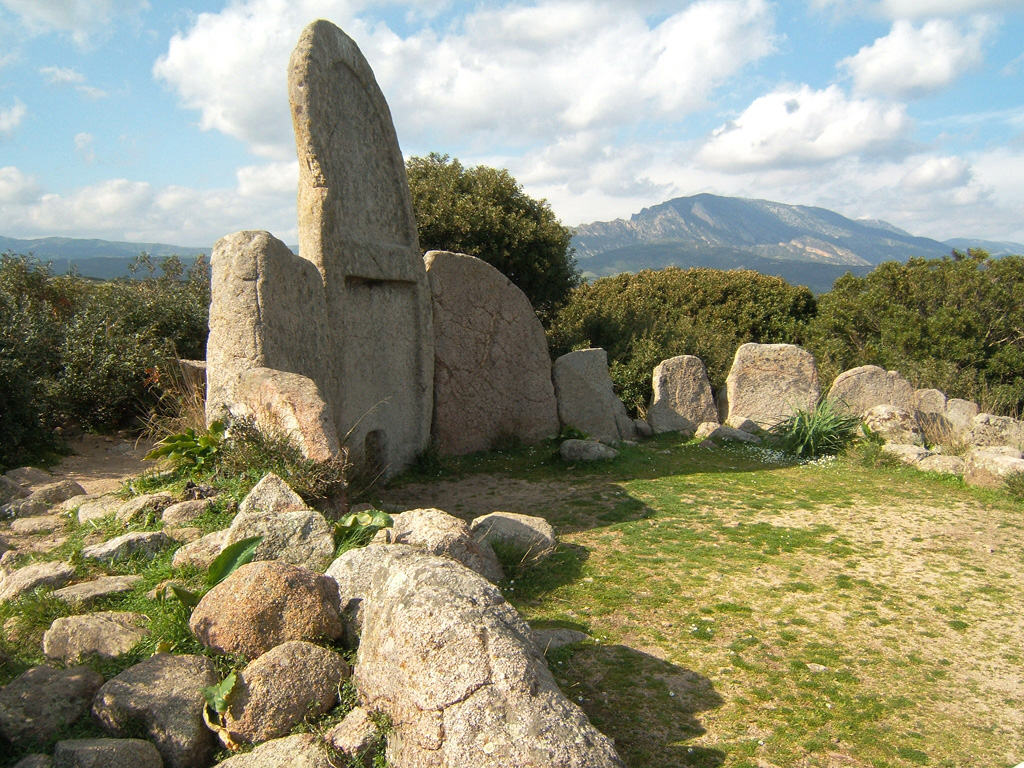
Giants' grave in Dorgali (Bronze Age)

The Nuraghes are not the only Nuragic buildings that stand in place, as there are several sacred wells around Sardinia and other buildings with religious purposes such as the Giants' grave (monumental collective tombs) and collections of religious buildings that probably served as destinations for pilgrimage and mass religious rites (e.g. Su Romanzesu near Bitti).

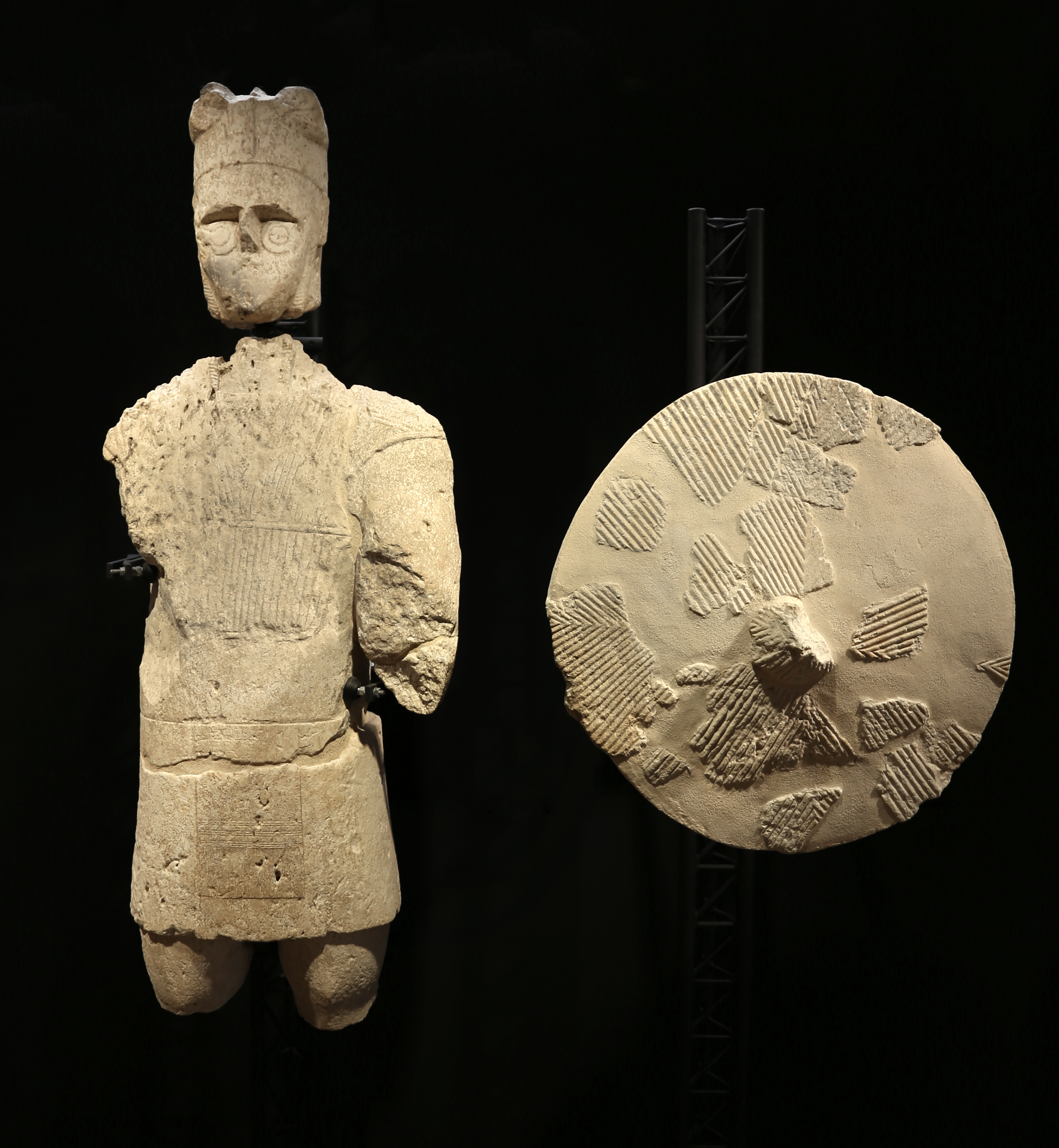
One of the so-called Giants of Mont'e Prama

At the time, Sardinia was at the centre of several commercial routes and it was an important provider of raw materials such as copper and lead, which were pivotal for the manufacture of the time. By controlling the extraction of these raw materials and by trading them with other countries, the ancient Sardinians were able to accumulate wealth and reach a level of sophistication that is not only reflected in the complexity of its surviving buildings, but also in its artworks (e.g. the votive bronze statuettes found across Sardinia or the statues of Mont'e Prama).

According to some scholars, the Nuragic people(s) are identifiable with the Sherden, a tribe of the Sea Peoples.

The Nuragic civilization was linked with other contemporaneous megalithic civilizations of the western Mediterranean, such as the Talaiotic culture of the Balearic Islands and the Torrean civilization of Southern Corsica. Evidence of trade with the other civilizations of the time is attested by several artefacts (e.g. pots), coming from as far as Cyprus, Crete, Mainland Greece, Spain and Italy, that have been found in Nuragic sites, bearing witness to the scope of commercial relations between the Nuragic people and other peoples in Europe and beyond.

=== Ancient history ===
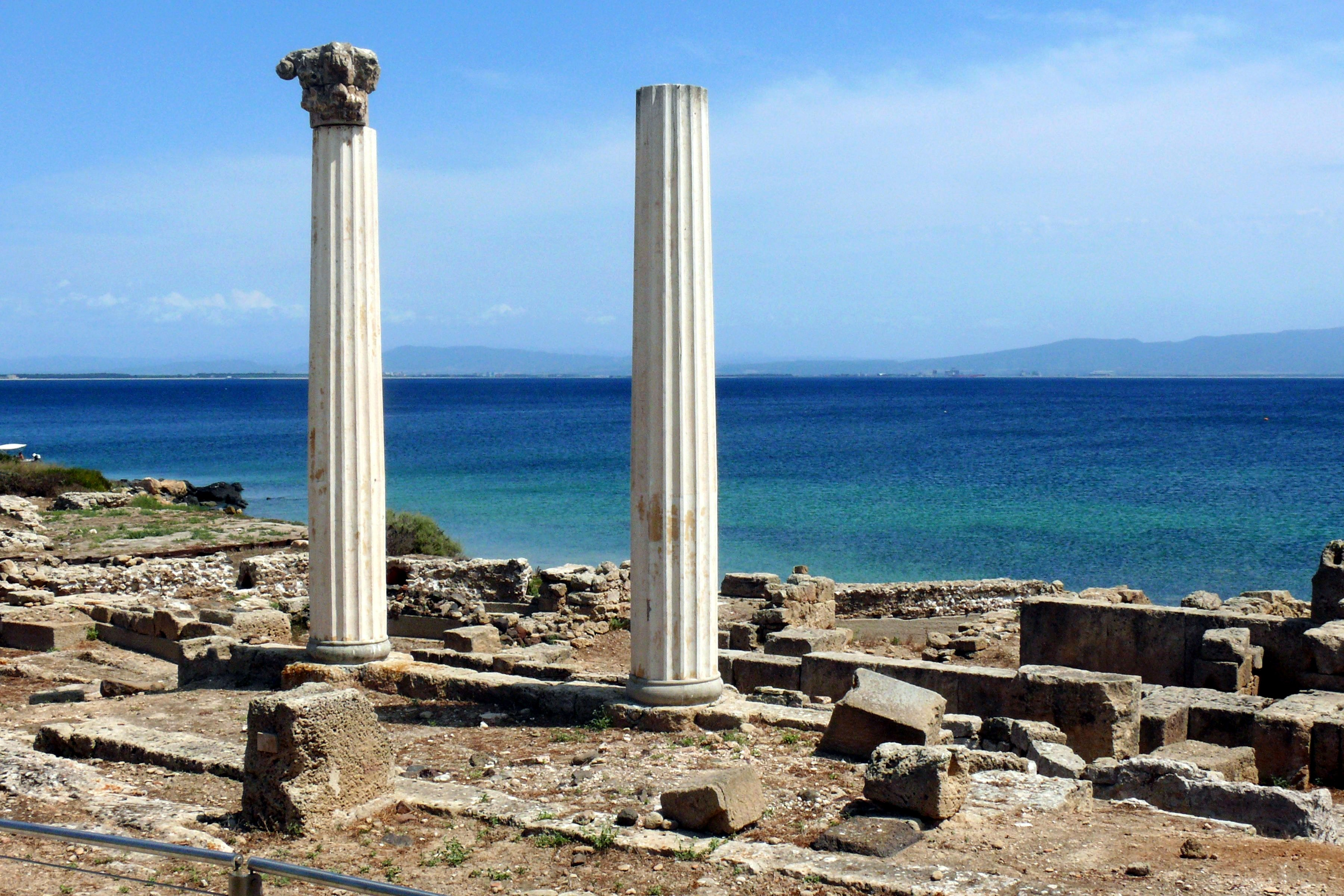
The Phoenician and subsequently Roman town of Tharros

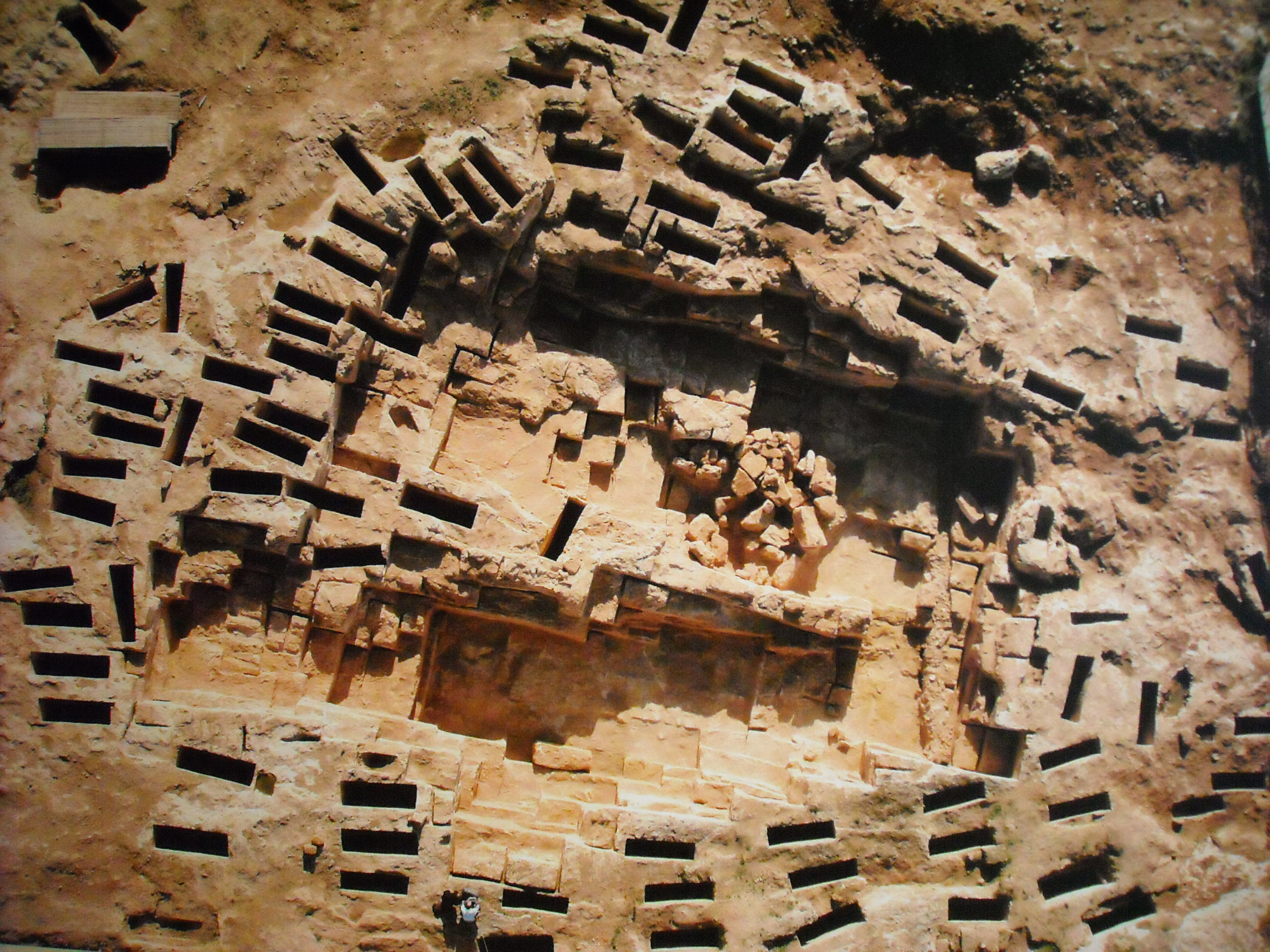
Necropolis of Tuvixeddu, Cagliari

Around the 9th century BC the Phoenicians began visiting Sardinia with increasing frequency, presumably initially needing safe overnight and all-weather anchorages along their trade routes from the coast of modern-day Lebanon as far afield as the African and European Atlantic coasts and beyond. The most common ports of call were Caralis, Nora, Bithia, Sulci, and Tharros. Claudian, a 4th-century Latin poet, in his poem De bello Gildonico, stated that Caralis was founded by people from Tyre, probably in the same time of the foundation of Carthage, in the 9th or 8th century BC. In the 6th century BC, after the conquest of western Sicily, the Carthaginians planned to annex Sardinia. A first invasion attempt led by Malchus was foiled by the victorious Nuraghic resistance. However, from 510 BC, the southern and west-central part of the island were invaded a second time and came under Carthaginian rule.

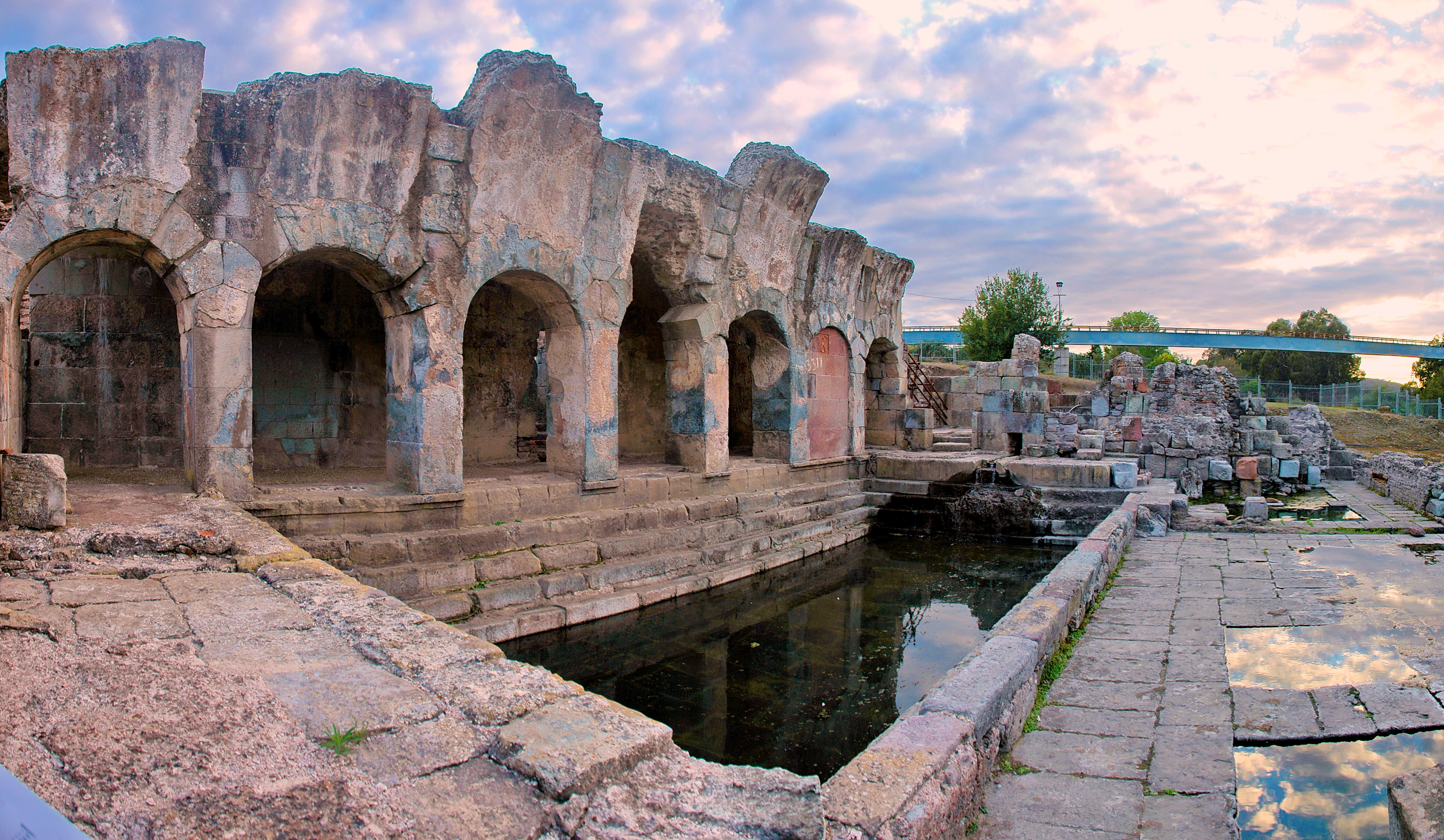
Roman thermae of Forum Traiani, in what is now Fordongianus

In 238 BC, taking advantage of Carthage having to face a rebellion of her mercenaries (the Mercenary War) after the First Punic War (264–241 BC), the Romans annexed Corsica and Sardinia from the Carthaginians. The two islands became the province of Corsica and Sardinia (they were made separate provinces in the imperial period). They were not given a provincial governor until 227 BC. The Romans faced many rebellions, and it took them many years to pacify both islands. The existing coastal cities were enlarged and embellished, and Roman colonies such as Turris Lybissonis and Feronia were founded. These were populated by Roman immigrants. The Roman military occupation brought the Nuragic civilization to an end, except for the mountainous interior of the island, which the Romans called Barbaria, meaning 'Barbarian land'. Roman rule in Sardinia lasted 694 years, during which time the province was an important source of grain for the capital. Its mineral resources were also greatly exploited. Latin came to be the dominant spoken language during this period, though Roman culture was slower to take hold, and Roman rule was often contested by the Sardinian tribes from the mountainous regions. From the Flavian period onward, funerary inscriptions applied natione Sardus to Sardinians commemorated outside the island, especially in second-century military and naval contexts.

=== Vandal conquest ===
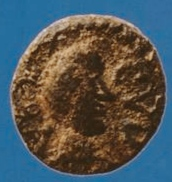
A Vandal-period coin found in Sardinia depicting Godas. Latin legend: REX CVDA.

The East Germanic tribe of the Vandals conquered Sardinia in 456. Their rule lasted for 78 years until 534 when, in the Vandalic War, 400 Eastern Roman troops led by Cyril, one of the officers of the foederati, retook the island. It is known that the Vandal government continued the forms of the existing Roman Imperial structure. The governor of Sardinia continued to be called the praeses and apparently continued to manage military, judicial, and civil governmental functions via imperial procedures. The only Vandal governor of Sardinia about whom there is substantial record is the last, Godas, a Visigoth noble. In AD 530, a coup d'état in Carthage removed King Hilderic, a convert to Nicene Christianity, in favor of his cousin Gelimer, an Arian Christian like most of the elite in his kingdom. Godas was sent to take charge and ensure the loyalty of Sardinia. He did the exact opposite, declaring the island's independence from Carthage and opening negotiations with Emperor Justinian I, who had declared war on Hilderic's behalf. In AD 533, Gelimer sent the bulk of his army and navy (120 vessels and 5,000 men) to Sardinia to subdue Godas, with the catastrophic result that the Vandal Kingdom was overwhelmed when Justinian's own army under Belisarius arrived at Carthage in their absence. The Vandal Kingdom ended and Sardinia was returned to Roman rule.

=== Byzantine era and the rise of the Judicates ===
In 533, Sardinia returned to the rule of the Byzantine Empire when the Vandals were defeated by the armies of Justinian I under the General Belisarius in the Battle of Tricamarum, in their African kingdom Belisarius sent his general Cyril to Sardinia to retake the island. Sardinia remained in Byzantine hands for the next 300 years aside from a short period in which it was invaded by the Ostrogoths in 551.

Under Byzantine rule, the island was divided into districts called mereíai (μερείαι) in Byzantine Greek, which were governed by a judge residing in Caralis and garrisoned by an army stationed in Forum Traiani (today Fordongianus) under the command of a dux. During this time, Christianity took deeper root on the island, supplanting the Paganism which had survived into the early Middle Ages in the culturally conservative hinterlands. Along with lay Christianity, the followers of monastic figures such as Basil of Caesarea became established in Sardinia. While Christianity penetrated the majority of the population, the region of Barbagia remained largely pagan and, probably, partially non-Latin speaking. They re-established a short-lived independent domain with Sardinian-heathen lay and religious traditions, one of its kings being Hospito. Pope Gregory I wrote a letter to Hospito defining him "Dux Barbaricinorum" and, being Christian, the leader and best of his people. In this unique letter about Hospito, the Pope prompts him to convert his people who "living all like irrational animals, ignore the true God and worship wood and stone" (Barbaricini omnes, ut insensata animalia vivant, Deum verum nesciant, ligna autem et lapides adorent).

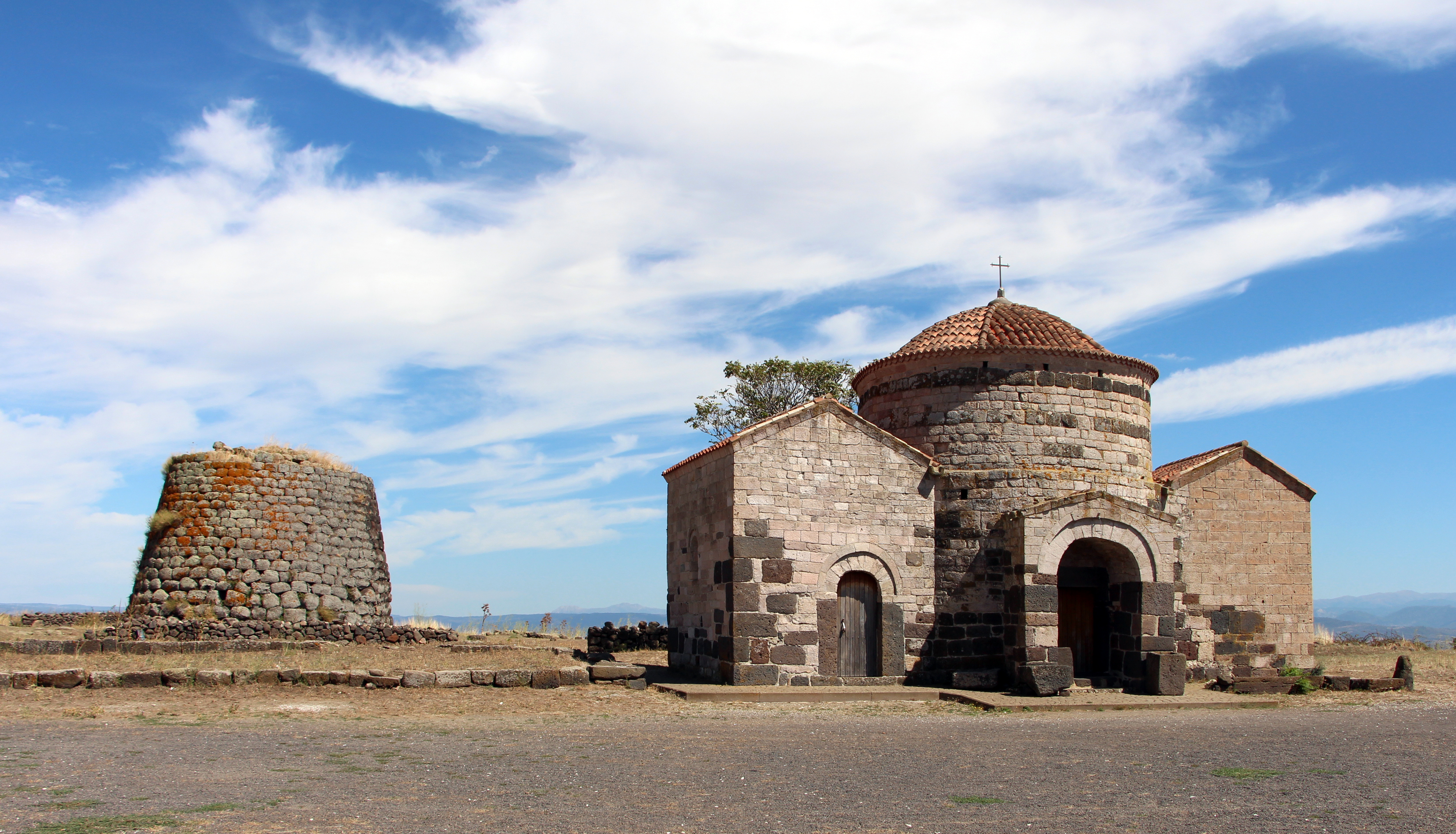
Santa Sabina Byzantine church and nuraghe in Silanus

The dates and circumstances of the end of Byzantine rule in Sardinia are not known. Direct central control was maintained at least through c. 650, after which local legates were empowered in the face of the rebellion of Gregory the Patrician, Exarch of Africa and the first invasion of the Muslim conquest of the Maghreb. There is some evidence that senior Byzantine administration in the Exarchate of Africa retreated to Caralis following the final fall of Carthage to the Arabs in 697. The loss of imperial control in Africa led to escalating raids by Arabs on the island, the first of which is documented in 703, forcing increased military self-reliance in the province.

Elsewhere in the central Mediterranean, the Aghlabids conquered the island of Malta in 870. They also attacked or raided Sardinia and Corsica. Some modern references state that Sardinia came under Aghlabid control around 810 or after the beginning of the conquest of Sicily in 827. Historian Corrado Zedda argues that the island hosted a Muslim presence during the Aghlabid period, possibly a limited foothold along the coasts that forcibly coexisted with the local Byzantine government. Historian Alex Metcalfe argues that the available evidence for any Muslim occupation or colonisation of the island during this period is limited and inconclusive, and that Muslim attacks were limited to raids.

Communication with the central government became daunting if not impossible during and after the Muslim conquest of Sicily between 827 and 902. A letter by Pope Nicholas I as early as 864 mentions the "Sardinian judges", without reference to the empire and a letter by Pope John VIII (r. 872–882) refers to them as principes ("princes"). By the time of De Administrando Imperio, completed in 952, the Byzantine authorities no longer listed Sardinia as an imperial province, suggesting they considered it lost. In all likelihood a local noble family, the Lacon-Gunale, acceded to the power of Archon, still identifying themselves as vassals of the Byzantines, but de facto independent as communications with Constantinople were very difficult. Only two names of those rulers are known: Salousios (Σαλούσιος) and the protospatharios Tourkotourios (Tουρκοτούριος) from two inscriptions), who probably reigned between the 10th and the 11th century. These rulers were still closely linked to the Byzantines, both for a pact of ancient vassalage, and from the ideological point of view, with the use of the Byzantine Greek language (in a Romance country), and the use of art of Byzantine inspiration.

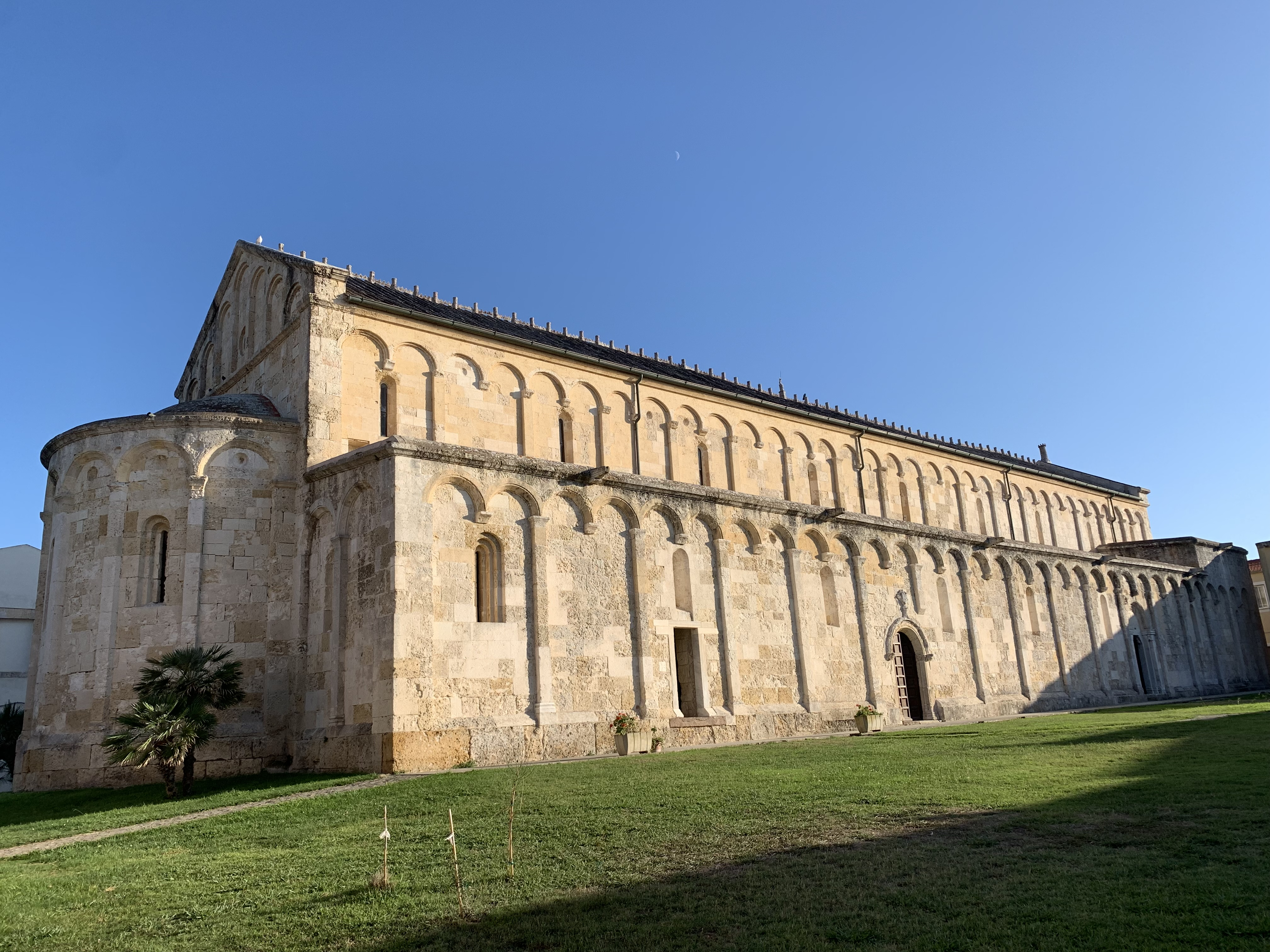
The medieval Basilica of San Gavino in Porto Torres

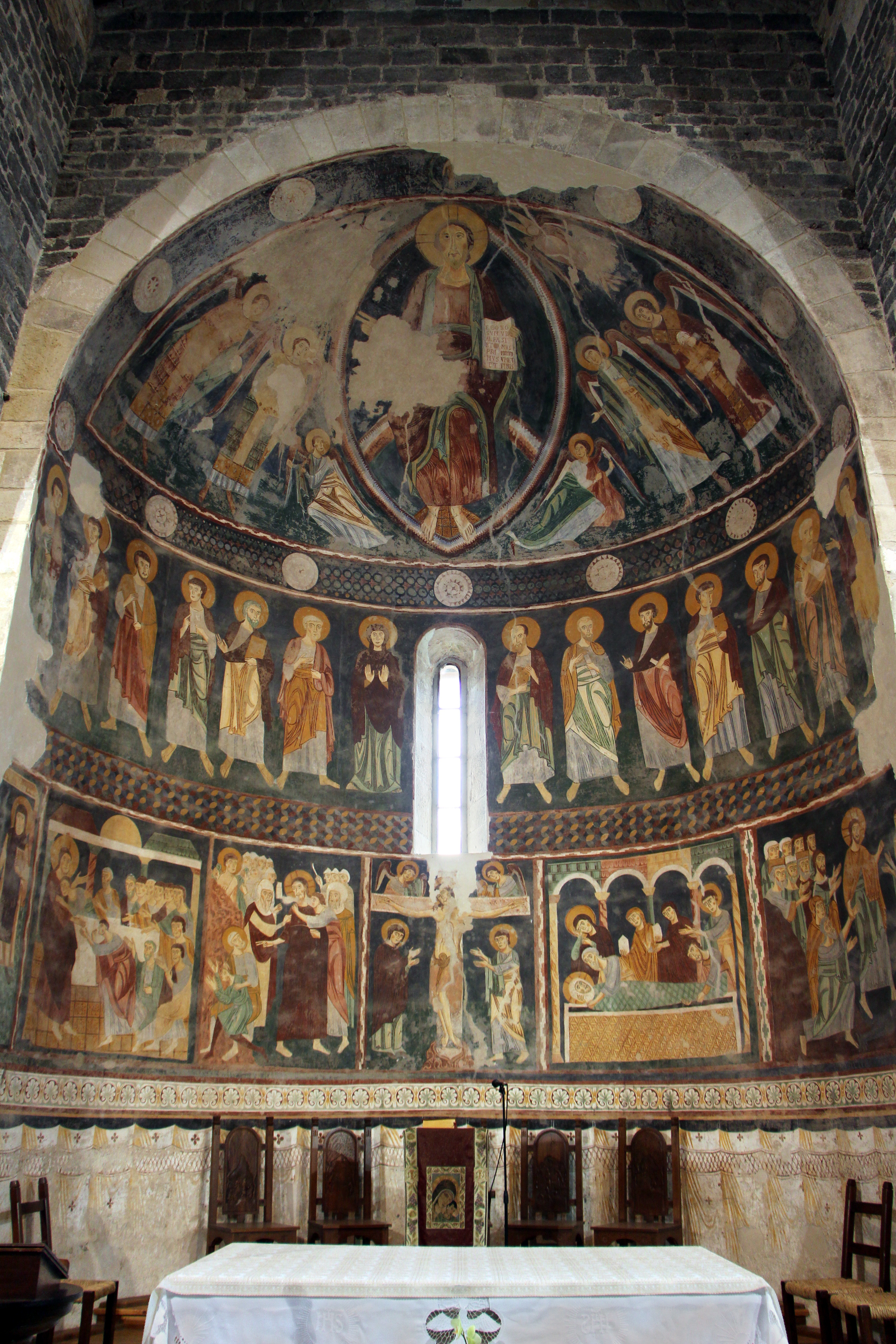
12th-century frescoes in the Basilica di Saccargia in Codrongianos

In the early 11th century, an attempt to conquer the island was made by Mujahid al-Amiri al-Ṣaqlabī, the ruler of Dénia and the Balearic Islands based in the Iberian Peninsula. The only records of that war are from Pisan and Genoese chronicles. The Christians won but, after that, the previous Sardinian kingdom was undermined and subsequently divided into four smaller states: Cagliari (Calari), Arborea (Arbaree), Gallura, and Torres or Logudoro.

Whether this final transformation from imperial civil servant to independent sovereign bodies resulted from imperial abandonment or local assertion, by the 10th century, the so-called "Judges" (Sardinian: judikes / Latin: iudices, a Byzantine administrative title) had emerged as the autonomous rulers of Sardinia. The title of iudice changed with the language and local understanding of the position, becoming the Sardinian judike, essentially a king or sovereign, while Judicate (Sardinian: logu) came to mean 'state'.

Early medieval Sardinian political institutions evolved from the millennium-old Roman imperial structures with relatively little Germanic influence.

Although the Judicates were hereditary lordships, the old Byzantine imperial notion that personal title or honor was separate from the state still remained, so the Judicate was not regarded as the personal property of the monarch as was common in later European feudalism. Like the imperial systems, the new order also preserved "semi-democratic" forms, with national assemblies called the Crown of the Realm. Each Judicate saw to its own defense, maintained its own laws and administration, and looked after its own foreign and trading affairs.

The history of the four Judicates would be defined by the contest for influence between the two Italian maritime powers of Genoa and Pisa, and later the ambitions of the Crown of Aragon.

The Sardinian Judicates

The Judicate of Cagliari or Pluminos, during the regency of Torchitorio V of Cagliari and his successor, William III, was allied with the Republic of Genoa. Because of this it was brought to an end in 1258, when its capital, Santa Igia, was stormed and destroyed by an alliance of Sardinian and Pisan forces. The territory then was divided between the Republic of Pisa, the Della Gherardesca family from Italy, and the Sardinian Judicates of Arborea and Gallura. Pisa maintained the control over the fortress of Castel di Cagliari founded by Pisan merchants in 1216–1217 east of Santa Igia; in the south-west the count Ugolino della Gherardesca promoted the birth of the town of Villa di Chiesa (today Iglesias) to exploit the nearby rich silver deposits.

The Judicate of Logudoro (also called Torres) was also allied to the Republic of Genoa and came to an end in 1259 after the death of the judikessa (queen) Adelasia. The territory was divided up between the Doria and Malaspina families of Genoa and the Bas-Serra family of Arborea, while the city of Sassari became a small republic, along the lines of the Italian city-states (comuni), confederated firstly with Pisa and then with Genoa.

The Judicate of Gallura ended in the year 1288, when the last giudice, Nino Visconti (a friend of Dante Alighieri), was driven out by the Pisans, who occupied the territory.

The Judicate of Arborea, having Oristano as its capital, had the longest life compared to the other kingdoms. Its later history is entwined with the attempt to unify the island into a single Sardinian state (Republica sardisca 'Sardinian Republic' in Sardinian, Nació sarda or sardesca 'Sardinian Nation' in Catalan) against their relatives and former Aragonese allies.

=== Aragonese period ===
In 1297, Pope Boniface VIII established on his own initiative (motu proprio) a hypothetical regnum Sardiniae et Corsicae ("Kingdom of Sardinia and Corsica") in order to settle the War of the Sicilian Vespers diplomatically. This had broken out in 1282 between the Capetian House of Anjou and Aragon over the possession of Sicily. Despite the existence of the indigenous states, the Pope offered this newly created crown to James II of Aragon, promising him support should he wish to conquer Pisan Sardinia in exchange for Sicily.

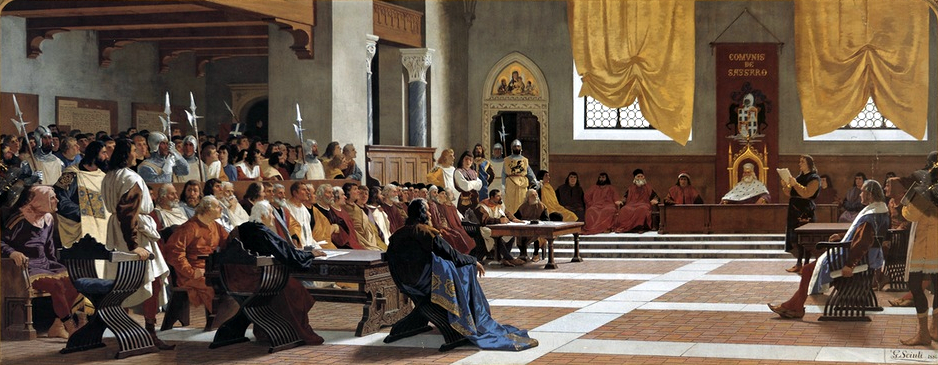
The proclamation of the Republic of Sassari. The Sassarese republic lasted from 1272 until 1323, when it sided with the new born Kingdom of Sardinia.

In 1324, in alliance with the Kingdom of Arborea and following a military campaign that lasted a year or so, the Aragon Crown Prince Alfonso led an Aragonese army that occupied the Pisan territories of Cagliari and Gallura along with the allied city of Sassari, naming them "The Kingdom of Sardinia and Corsica". The kingdom was to remain a dominion of the Crown of Aragon (under the 16th-century kings of Spain) until the Peace of Utrecht.

During this period, the Judicate of Arborea promulgated the legal code of the kingdom in the Carta de Logu ('Charter of the Land'). The Carta de Logu was originally compiled by judike Marianus IV of Arborea, and was amended and updated by Mariano's daughter, judikessa Eleanor of Arborea. The legal code was written in Sardinian and established a whole range of citizens' rights. Among the revolutionary concepts in this Carta de Logu was the right of women to refuse marriage and to own property. In terms of civil liberties, the code made provincial 14th century Sardinia one of the most developed societies in all of Europe.

In 1353, Peter IV of Aragon, following Catalan-Aragonese customs, granted a parliament to the kingdom of Sardinia and Corsica, which was followed by some degree of self-government under a viceroy and judicial independence. This parliament, however, had limited powers. It consisted of high-ranking military commanders, the clergy and the nobility. The Crown of Aragon also introduced the feudal system into the areas of Sardinia that it ruled.

The Sardinian Judicates never adopted feudalism, and Arborea maintained its parliament, called the Corona de Logu 'Crown of the Realm'. In this parliament, apart from the nobles and military commanders, also sat the representatives of each township and village. The Corona de Logu exercised some control over the king: under the rule of the bannus consensus the king could be deposed or even executed if he did not follow the rules of the kingdom.

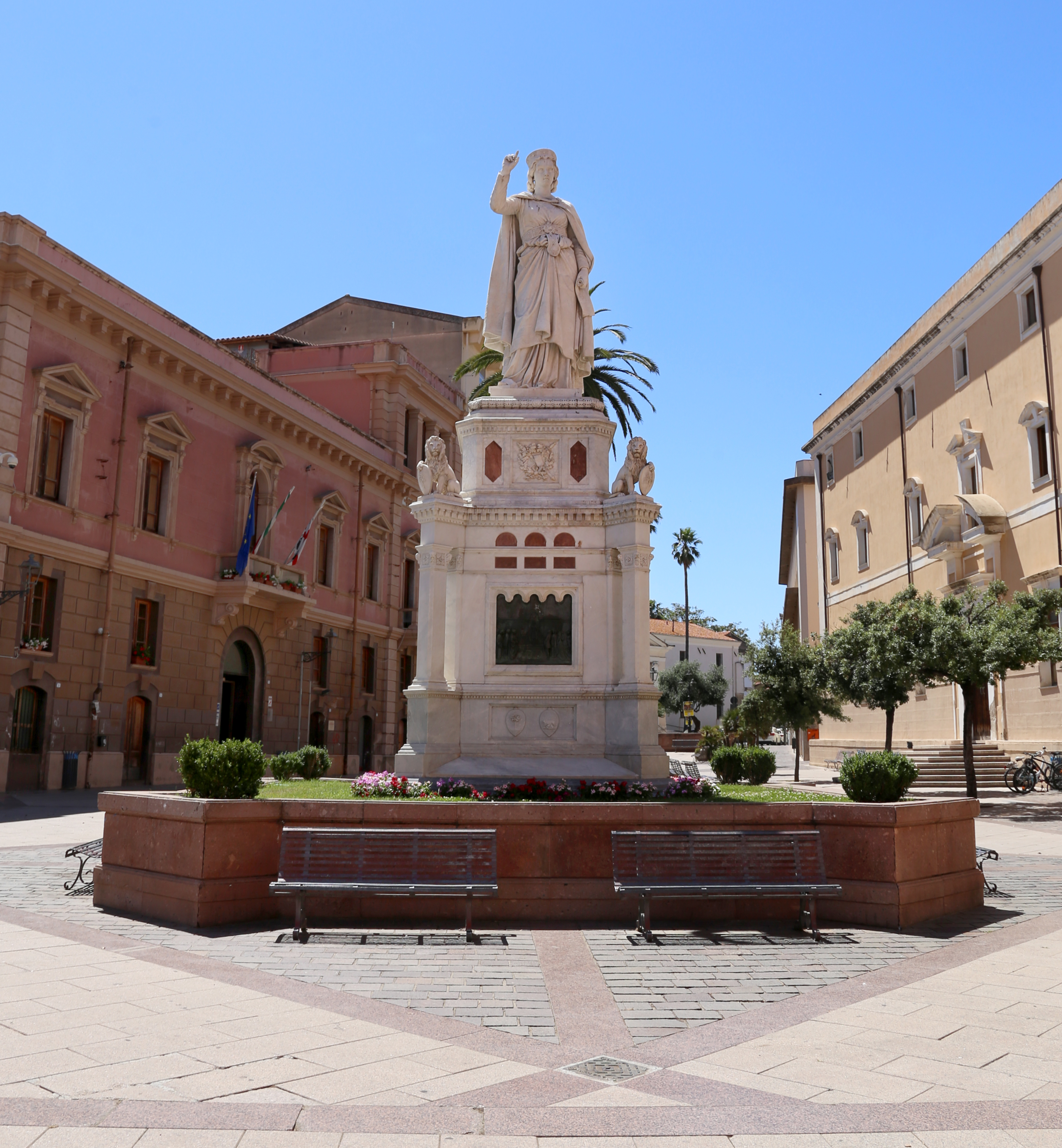
Statue of the Juighissa Eleanor of Arborea in Oristano by Ulisse Cambi

Having broken the alliance with the Crown of Aragon, from 1353 to 1409, the Arborean giudici Marianus IV, Hugh III and Brancaleone Doria (husband of Eleanor of Arborea), succeeded in occupying all of Sardinia except the heavily fortified towns of the Castle of Cagliari and Alghero, which for years remained as the only Aragonese dominions in Sardinia (Sardinian–Catalan war).

In 1409, Martin I of Sicily, king of Sicily and heir to the crown of Aragon, defeated the Sardinians at the Battle of Sanluri. The battle was fought by about 20,000 Sardinian, Genoese and French knights, enrolled from their kingdom at a time when the population of Sardinia had been greatly depleted by the plague. Despite the Sardinian army outnumbering the Aragonese army, they were defeated.

The Judicate of Arborea disappeared in 1420, when its rights were sold by the last king for 100,000 gold florins, and after some of its most notable men switched sides in exchange for privileges. For example, Leonardo Cubello, with some claim to the crown being from a family related to the Kings of Arborea, was granted the title of Marquis of Oristano and feudal rights on a territory that partly overlapped with the original extension of the Kingdom of Arborea in exchange for his subjection to the Aragonese monarchs.

The conquest of Sardinia by the Crown of Aragon meant the introduction of the feudal system throughout Sardinia. Thus Sardinia is probably the only European country where feudalism was introduced in the transition period from the Middle Ages to the early modern period, at a time when feudalism had already been abandoned by many other European countries.

=== Spanish period ===
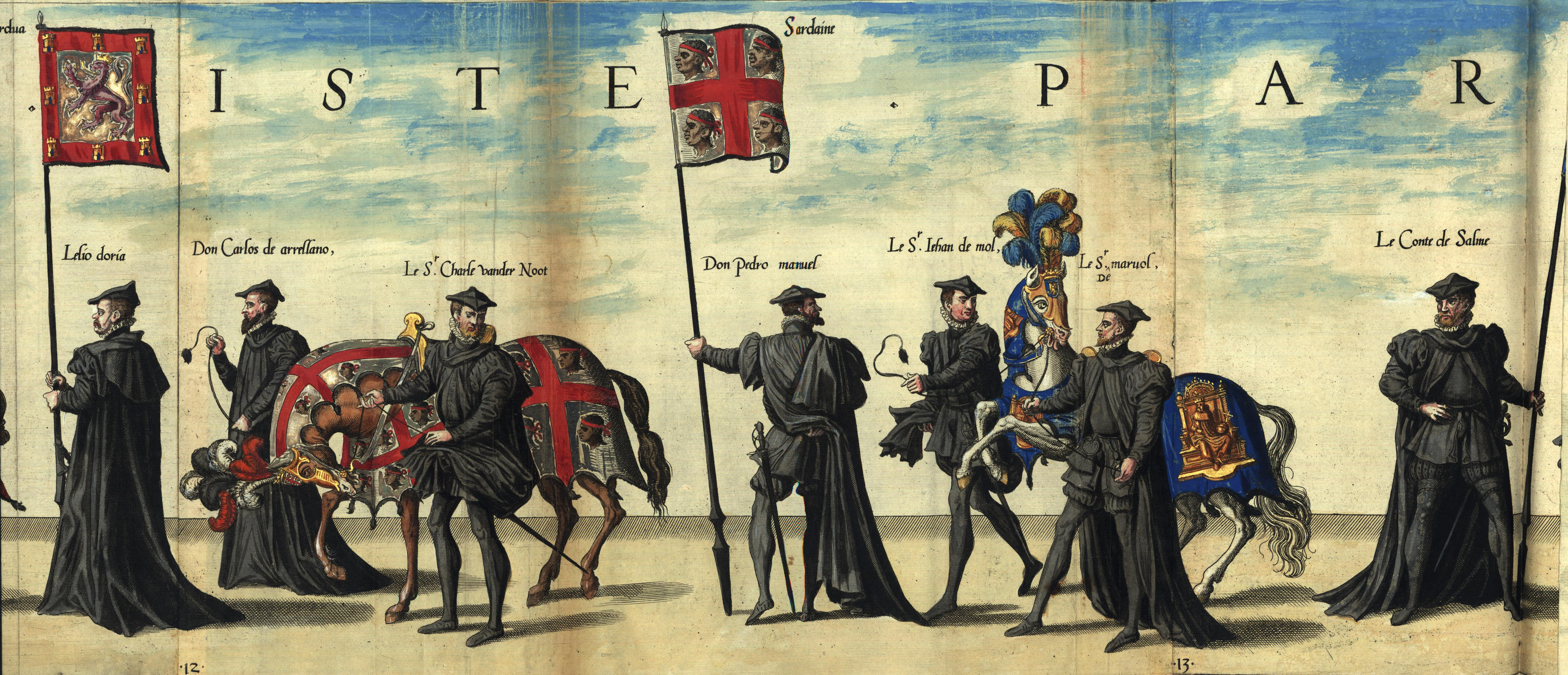
Flag of the Kingdom of Sardinia (center) at the funeral of Charles I of Spain

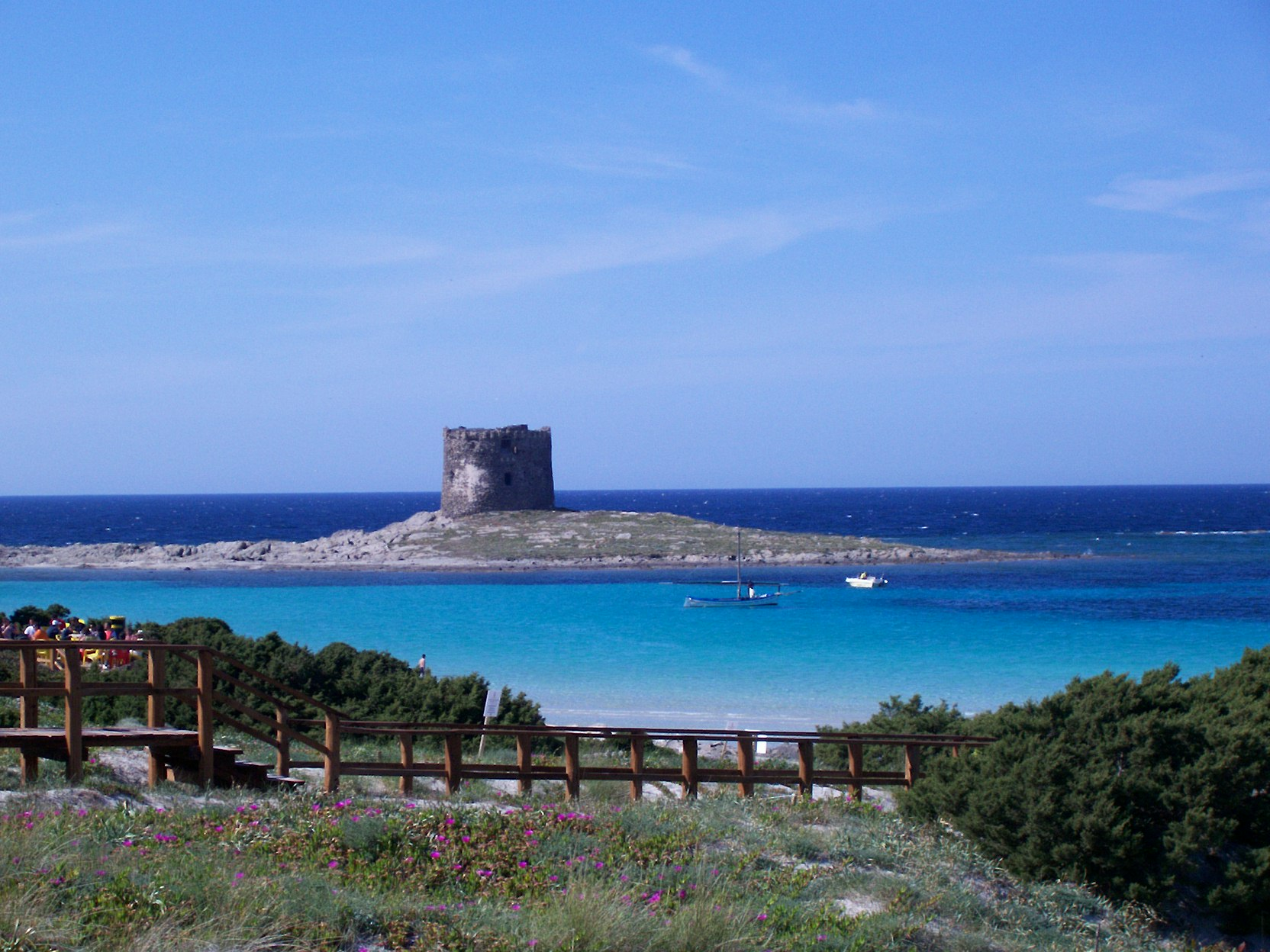
Spanish era coastal tower in Stintino called Torre della Pelosa

In 1469, the heir to Sardinia, Ferdinand II of Aragon, married Isabel of Castile, and the "Kingdom of Sardinia" (which was separated from Corsica) was to be inherited by their Habsburg grandson, Charles I of Spain, with the state symbol of the Four Moors. The successors of Charles I of Spain, in order to defend their Mediterranean territories from raids of the Barbary pirates, fortified the Sardinian shores with a system of coastal lookout towers, allowing the gradual resettlement of some coastal areas.

The Kingdom of Sardinia remained Aragonese-Spanish for about 400 years, from 1323 to 1708, assimilating a number of Spanish traditions, customs and linguistic expressions, nowadays vividly portrayed in the folklore parades of Saint Efisio in Cagliari (1 May), the Cavalcade on Sassari (last but one Sunday in May), and the Redeemer in Nuoro (28 August). To this day Catalan is still spoken in the north-western city of Alghero (l'Alguer).

Many famines have been reported in Sardinia. According to Stephen L. Dyson and Robert J. Rowland, "The Jesuits of Cagliari recorded years during the late 16th century "of such hunger and so sterile that the majority of the people could sustain life only with wild ferns and other weeds" ... During the terrible famine of 1680, some 80,000 people, out of a total population of 250,000, are said to have died, and entire villages were devastated ... "

=== Savoyard period ===
In 1708, as a consequence of the Spanish War of Succession, the rule of the Kingdom of Sardinia passed from King Philip V of Spain into the hands of the Austrians, who occupied the island. The Treaty of Utrecht granted Sardinia to the Austrians, but in 1717, Cardinal Giulio Alberoni, minister of Philip V of Spain, reoccupied Sardinia.

In 1718, with the Treaty of London, Sardinia was eventually handed over to the House of Savoy, who would start controlling it from 1720 onwards; this Alpine dynasty would go on to introduce the Italian language on the island forty years later in 1760, thereby starting a process of Italianization amongst the islanders.

In 1793, Sardinians repelled the French Expédition de Sardaigne during the French Revolutionary Wars. On 23 February 1793, Domenico Millelire, commanding the Sardinian fleet, defeated the fleets of the French Republic near the Maddalena archipelago, of which then-lieutenant Napoleon Bonaparte was a leader. Millelire became the first recipient of the Gold Medal of Military Valor of the Italian Armed Forces. In the same month, Sardinians stopped the attempted French landing on the beach of Quartu Sant'Elena, near the Capital of Cagliari. Because of these successes, the representatives of the nobility and clergy (Stamenti) formulated five requests addressed to the King Victor Amadeus III of Sardinia, but they were all met with rejection. Because of this discontent, on 28 April 1794, during an uprising in Cagliari, two Savoyard officials were killed; that was the spark that ignited a revolt (called the "Sardinian Vespers") throughout the island, which started on 28 April 1794 (commemorated today as sa die de sa Sardigna) with the expulsion and execution of the Piedmontese officers for a few days from the Capital Cagliari.

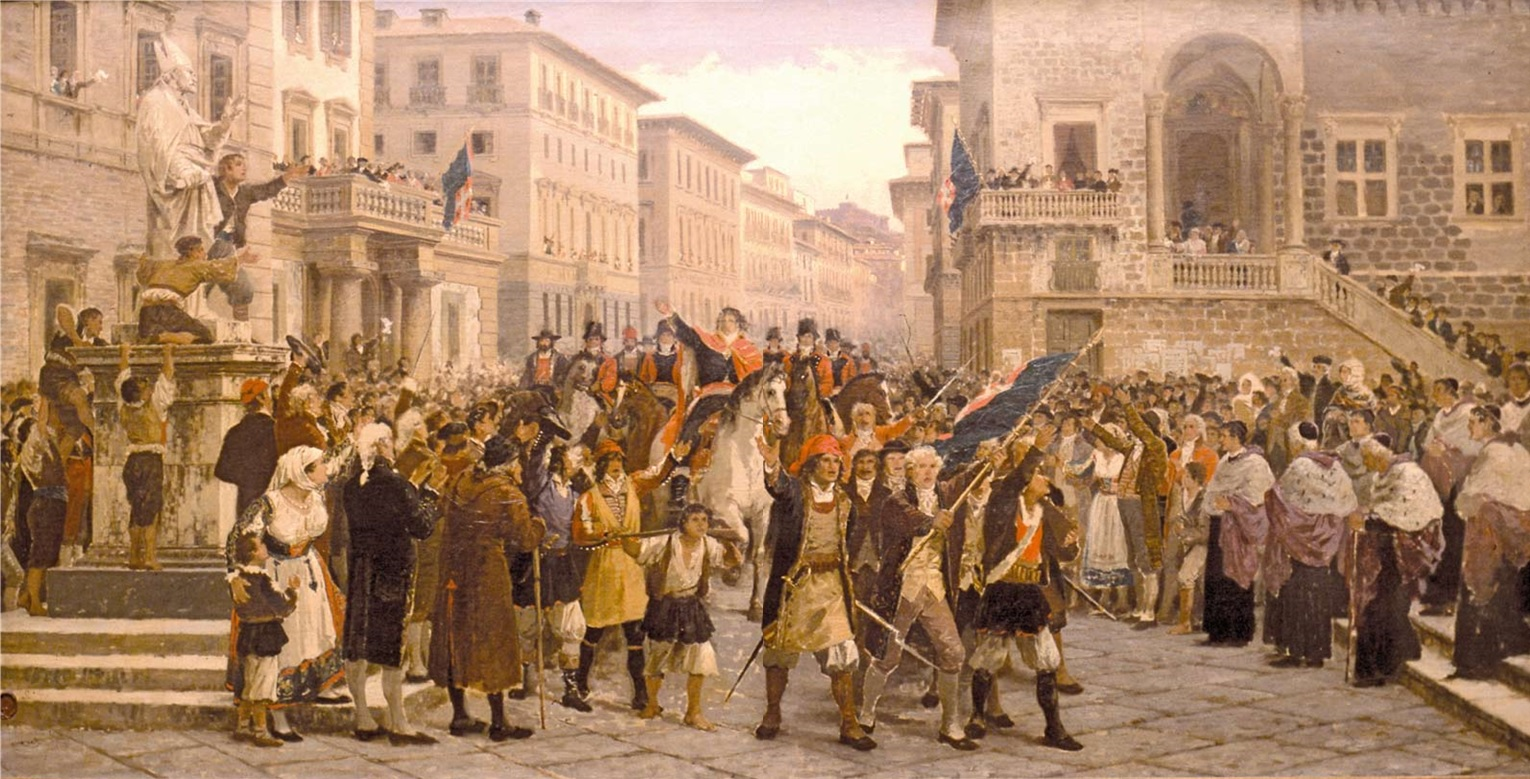
G.M. Angioy entry into Sassari

On 28 December 1795 Sassari insurgents demonstrating against feudalism, mainly from the region of Logudoro, occupied the city. On 13 February 1796, in order to prevent the spread of the revolt, the viceroy Filippo Vivalda gave the Sardinian magistrate Giovanni Maria Angioy the role of Alternos, which meant a substitute of the viceroy himself. Angioy moved from Cagliari to Sassari, and during his journey almost all the villages joined the uprising, demanding an end to feudalism and aiming to declare the island to be an independent republic, but once he was outnumbered by loyalist forces he fled to Paris and sought support for a French annexation of the island.

In 1798, the islet near Sardinia was attacked by the Tunisians and over 900 inhabitants were taken away as slaves. The final Muslim attack on the island was on Sant'Antioco on 16 October 1815, over a millennium since the first.

In 1799, as a consequence of the Napoleonic Wars in Italy, the Savoy royal family left Turin and took refuge in Cagliari for some fifteen years. In 1847, the Sardinian parliaments (Stamenti), in order to get the Piedmontese liberal reforms they could not afford due to their separated legal system, renounced their state autonomy and agreed to form a union with the Italian Mainland States (Stati di Terraferma), ending up with a single parliament, a single magistracy and a single government in Turin; this move aggravated the island's peripheral condition and most of the pro-union supporters, including its leader Giovanni Siotto Pintor, would later regret it.

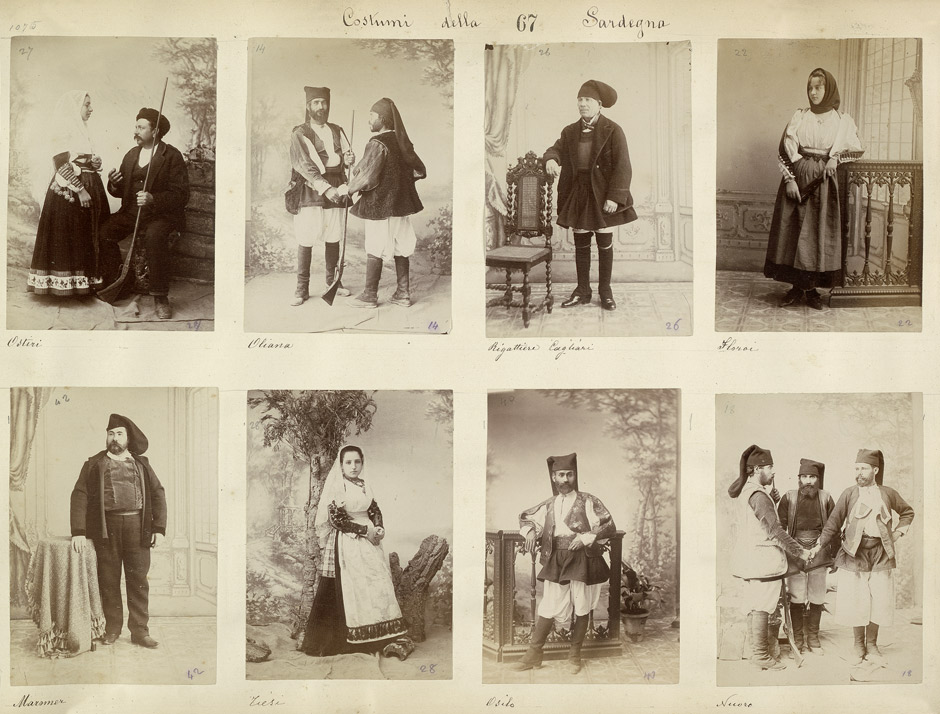
Sardinians wearing traditional ethnic garments, 1880s

In 1820, the Savoyards imposed the Enclosures Act (Editto delle Chiudende) on the island, aimed at turning the land's traditional collective ownership, a cultural and economic cornerstone of Sardinia since the Nuragic times, to private property. This gave rise to many abuses, as the reform ended up favouring the landholders while excluding the poor Sardinian farmers and shepherds, who witnessed the abolition of the communal rights and the sale of their lands. Many local rebellions like the Nuorese Su Connottu ('The Already Known' in Sardinian) riot in 1868, all repressed by the King's army, resulted in an attempt to return to the past and reaffirm the right to use the once common land. However the common lands (called ademprivios) were never completely abolished, and they are still present in large number to this day (500,000 hectares of common lands were counted in 1956, of which 345,000 constituted by woods).

=== Kingdom of Italy ===
With the Perfect Fusion in 1848, the confederation of states powered by the Savoyard kings of Sardinia became a unitary and constitutional state and moved to the Italian Wars of Independence for the Unification of Italy, that were led for thirteen years. In 1861, being Italy united by a debated war campaign, the parliament of the Kingdom of Sardinia decided by law to change its name and the title of its king to Kingdom of Italy and King of Italy. Most Sardinian forests were cut down at this time, in order to provide the Piedmontese with raw materials, like wood, used to make railway sleepers on the mainland. The primary natural forests, praised by every traveller visiting Sardinia, would in fact be reduced to one-fifth of their original number, being little more than 100,000 hectares at the end of the century. From 1850 onward, taxes more than doubled in Sardinia, which compounded the already severe financial hardships facing the islanders, due to the Italo-French tariff war: between 1885 and 1897, the Sardinians saw their land being confiscated more than the rest of Italy combined as a result of tax evasion.

During the First World War, the Sardinian soldiers of the Brigata Sassari distinguished themselves. It was the first and only regional military unit in Italy, since the people enrolled were only Sardinians. The brigade suffered heavy losses and earned four Gold Medals of Military Valor. Sardinia lost more young people than any other Italian region on the front, with 138 casualties per 1000 soldiers compared to the Italian average of 100 casualties.

During the Fascist period, with the implementation of the policy of autarky, several swamps around the island were reclaimed and agrarian communities founded. The main communities were the village of Mussolinia (now called Arborea), populated by farmers from Veneto and Friuli, in the area of Oristano and Fertilia, populated at first by settlers from the Ferrara area, followed, after World War II, by a notable number of Istrian Italians and Dalmatian Italians hailing from territories lost to Yugoslavia, in the area adjacent the city of Alghero, within the region of Nurra. Also established during that time (1938) was the city of Carbonia, which became the main centre of coal mining activity, that attracted thousand of workers from the rest of the Island and the Italian mainland. The Sardinian writer Grazia Deledda won the Nobel Prize for Literature in 1926.

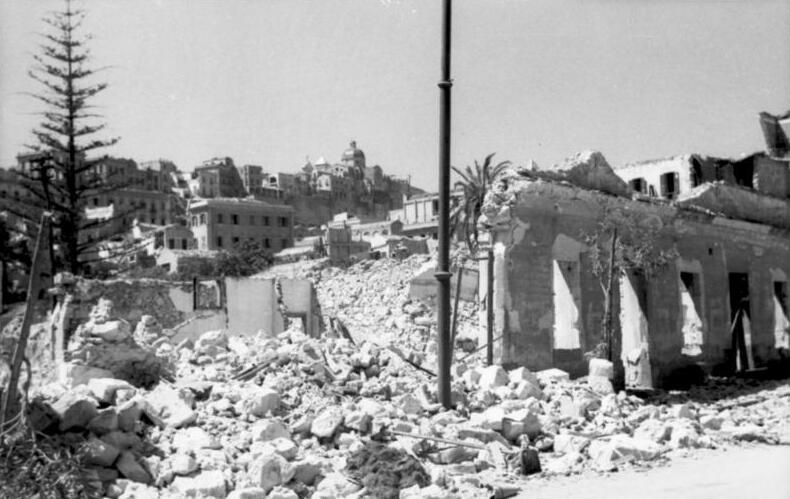
Effect of Allied bombing on Cagliari during the Second World War

During the Second World War, Sardinia was an important air and naval base and was heavily bombed by the Allies, especially the city of Cagliari. German troops left the island on 8 September 1943, a few days after the Armistice of Cassibile, and retired to Corsica without fighting and bloodshed, after a bilateral agreement between the general Antonio Basso (Commander of the Armed Forces of Sardinia) and the German Karl Hans Lungerhausen, general of the 90th Panzergrenadier Division.

=== Post-Second World War period ===
In 1946, by popular referendum, Italy became a republic, with Sardinia being administered since 1948 by a special statute of autonomy. By 1951, malaria was successfully eliminated by the ERLAAS, Anti-malaric Regional Authority, and the support of the Rockefeller Foundation, which facilitated the commencement of the Sardinian tourist boom. With the increase in tourism, coal decreased in importance but Sardinia followed the Italian economic miracle.

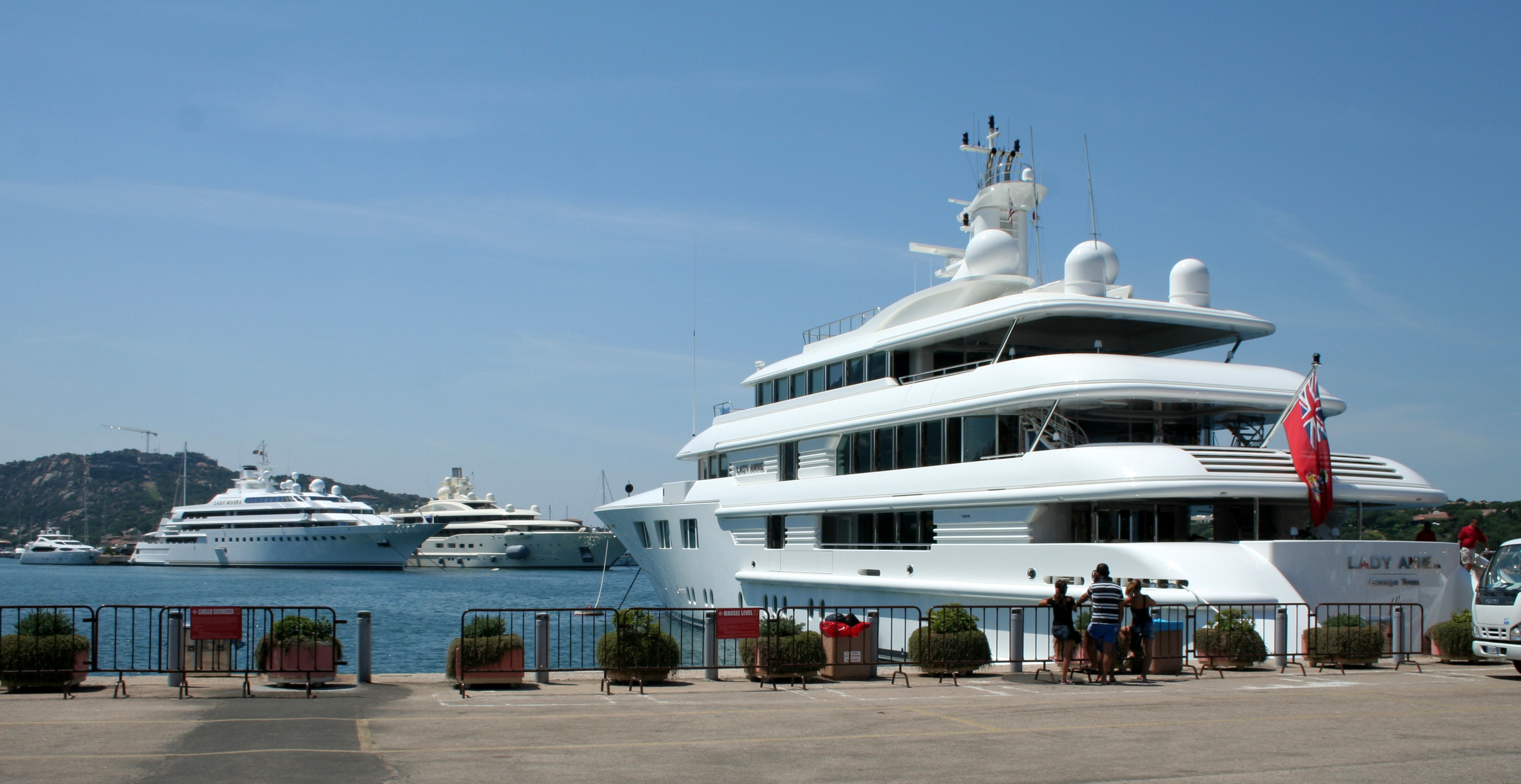
Super yachts anchored at Porto Cervo port, Costa Smeralda

In the early 1960s, an industrialisation effort was commenced, the so-called Piani di Rinascita (rebirth plans), with the initiation of major infrastructure projects on the island. These included the construction of new dams and roads, reforestation, agricultural zones on reclaimed marshland, and large industrial complexes (primarily oil refineries and related petrochemical operations). With the creation of petrochemical industries, thousands of ex-farmers became industrial workers. The 1973 oil crisis caused the termination of employment for thousands of workers employed in the petrochemical industries, which aggravated the emigration already present in the 1950s and 1960s.

Sardinia faced the creation of military bases on the island, like Decimomannu Air Base and Salto di Quirra (the biggest scientific military base in Europe) in the same decades. Even now, around 60% of all Italian and NATO military installations in Italy are on Sardinia, whose area is less than one-tenth of all the Italian territory and whose population is little more than the 2.5%; furthermore, they comprise over 35,000 hectares used for experimental weapons testing, where 80% of the military explosives in Italy are used.

Sardinian nationalism and local protest movements became stronger in the 1970s, and a number of bandits (anonima sarda) started a long series of kidnappings, which ended only in the 1990s. This also gave rise to various militant groups that blended separatist and communist ideas, the most famous being Barbagia Rossa and the Sardinian Armed Movement, which perpetrated several bombings and terrorist actions between the 1970s and the 1980s. In the span of just two years (1987–1988), 224 bombing attacks were reported.

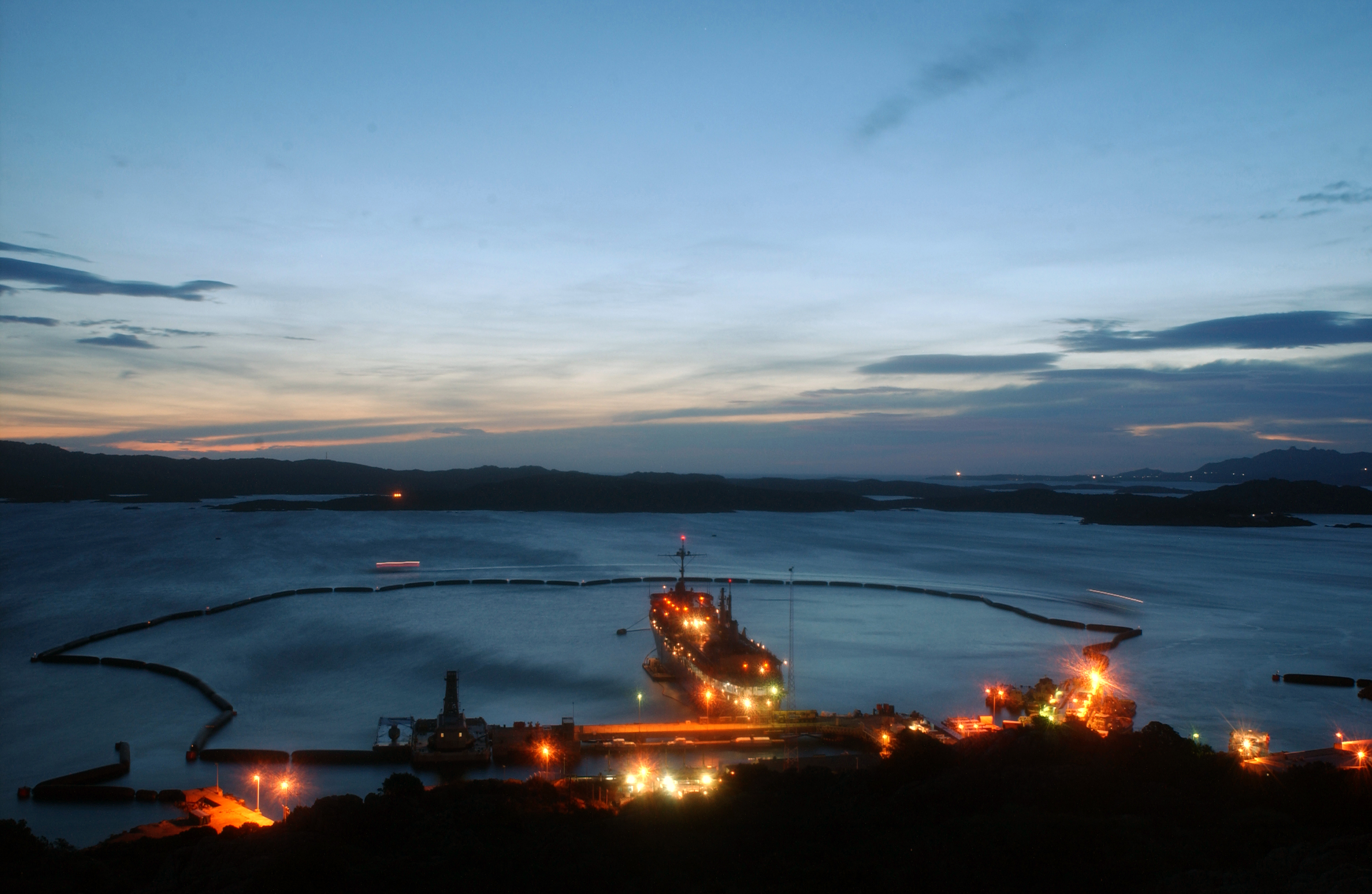
Santo Stefano's former NATO naval base

In 1983 a prominent activist of a separatist party, the Sardinian Action Party (Partidu Sardu – Partito Sardo d'Azione), was elected president of the regional parliament, and in the 1980s several other movements calling for independence from Italy were born; in the 1990s some of them became political parties, even if in a rather disjointed manner. It was not until 1999 that the island's languages (Sardinian, Sassarese, Gallurese, Algherese and Tabarchino) were recognised, even if just formally, together with Italian. The 35th G8 summit was planned by Prodi II Cabinet to be held in Sardinia, on the island of La Maddalena, in July 2009; however, in April 2009, the Italian Prime Minister, Silvio Berlusconi, decided, without convoking the Italian parliament or consulting the Sardinian governor of his own party, to move the summit, even though the works were almost completed, to L'Aquila, provoking heavy protests.

Today Sardinia is phasing in as an EU region, with a diversified economy focused on tourism and the tertiary sector. The economic efforts of the last twenty years have reduced the handicap of insularity, especially in the fields of low-cost air travel and advanced information technology. For example, the CRS4 (Center for Advanced Studies, Research and Development in Sardinia) developed the second European website and 1st in Italy in 1991 and webmail in 1995. CRS4 allowed several telecommunication companies and internet service providers based on the island to flourish, such as Videonline in 1994, Tiscali in 1998 and Andala Umts in 1999.

== Geography ==
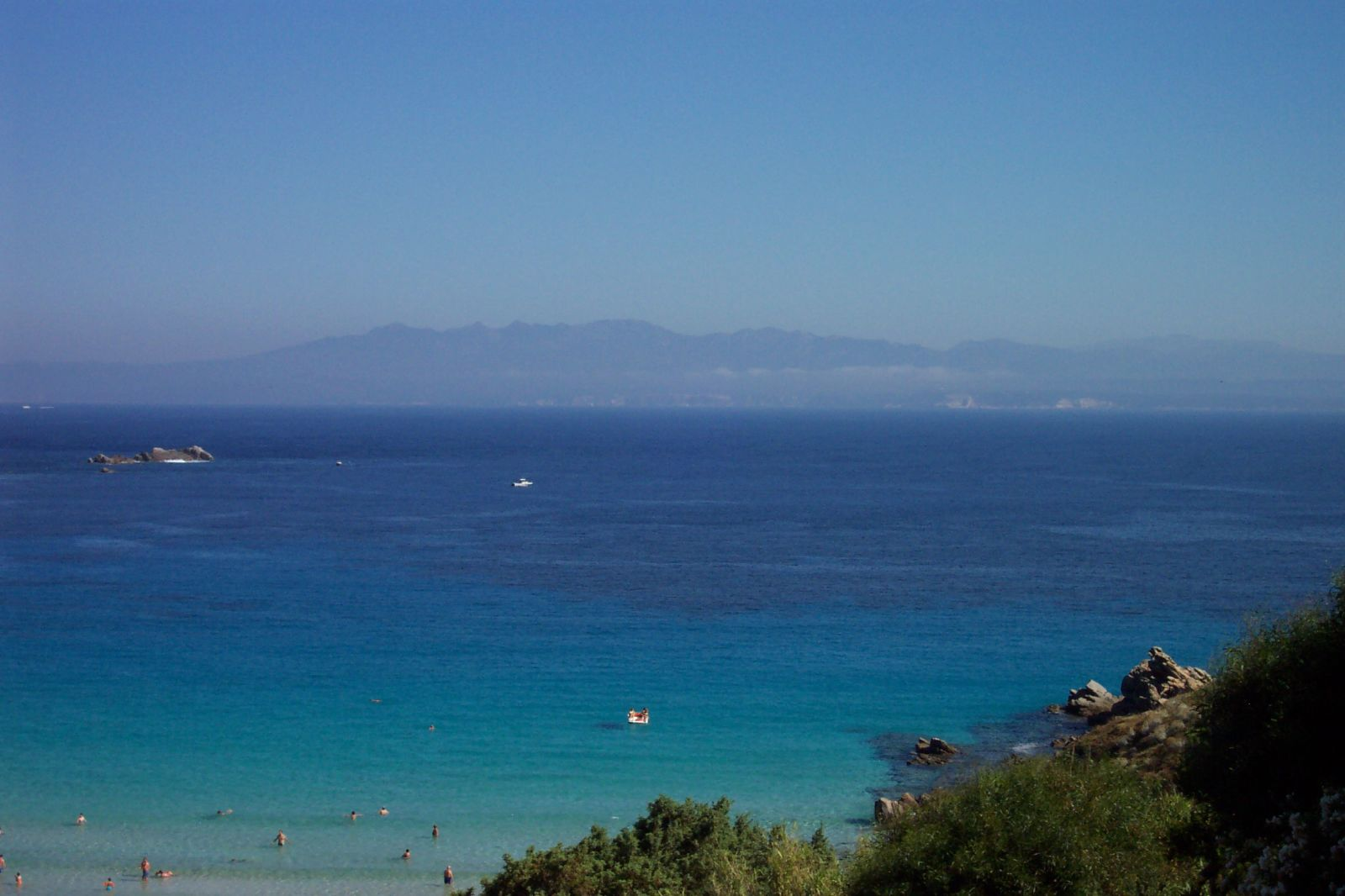
Strait of Bonifacio. The southern coast of Corsica can be seen from Santa Teresa Gallura.

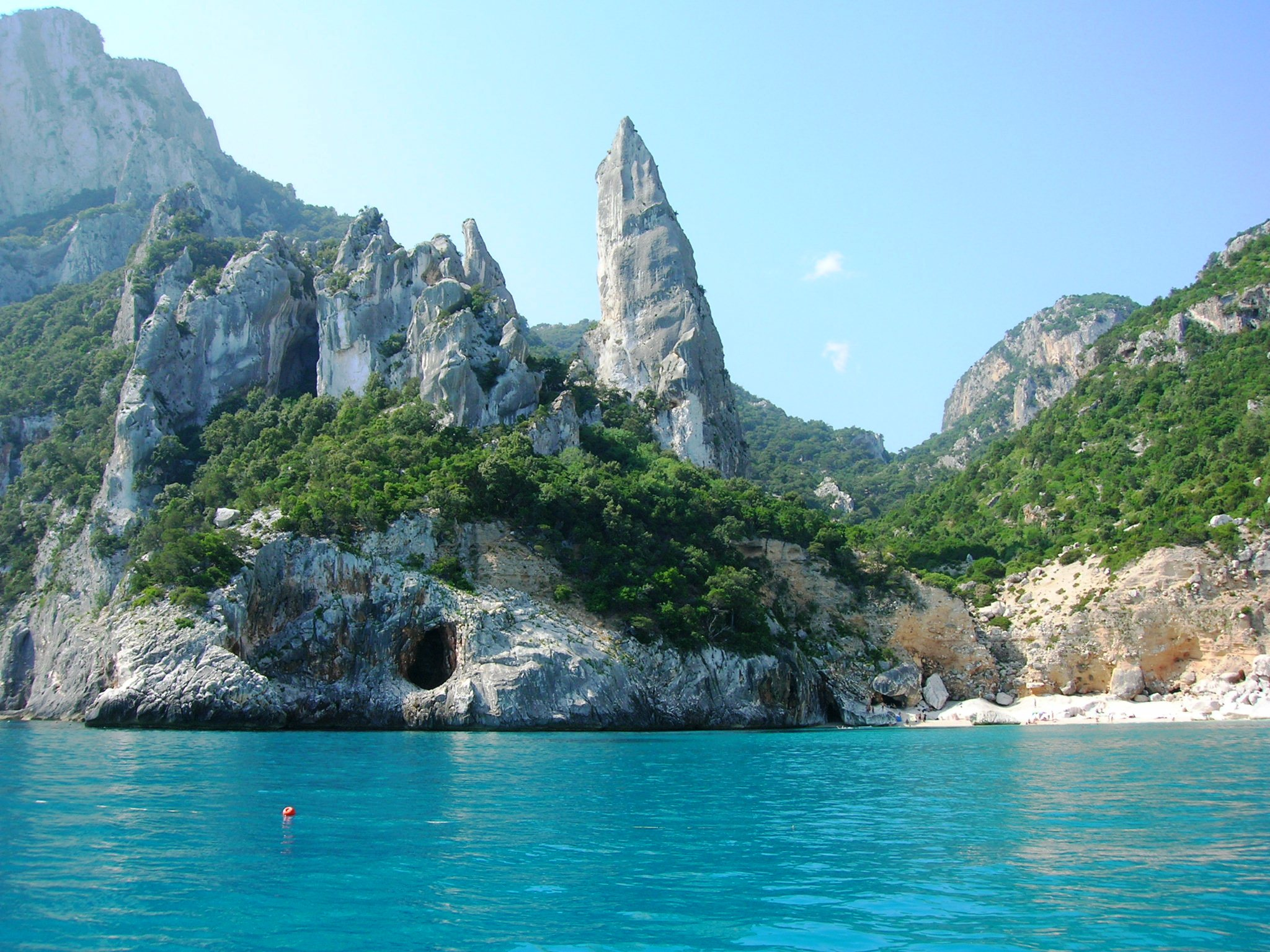
Cala Goloritzé, Baunei

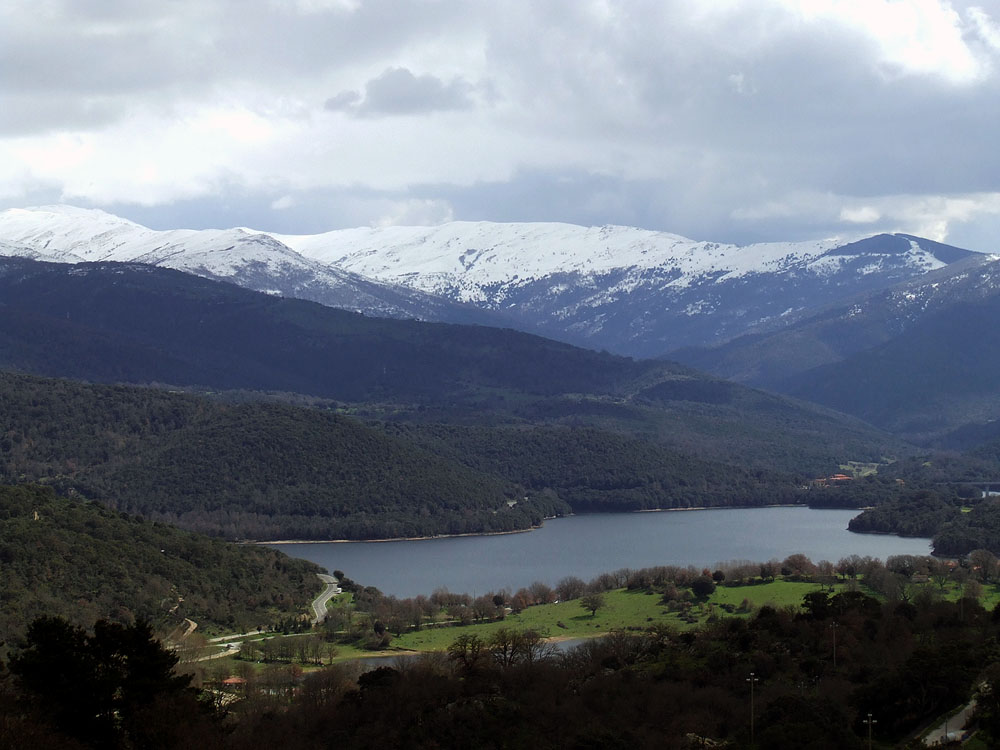
View of Gennargentu, the highest massif of Sardinia

A proportionate graph of Sardinian topography: 13.6% of the island is mountainous, 18.5% is flat, and 67.9% is hilly.

Sardinia is the second-largest island in the Mediterranean Sea (after Sicily and before Cyprus), with an area of 24,100 km^{2} (9,305 sq mi). It is situated between 38° 51' and 41° 18' latitude north (respectively Isola del Toro and Isola La Presa) and 8° 8' and 9° 50' east longitude (respectively Capo dell'Argentiera and Capo Comino). To the west of Sardinia is the Sea of Sardinia, a unit of the Mediterranean Sea; to Sardinia's east is the Tyrrhenian Sea, which is also an element of the Mediterranean Sea.

The nearest land masses are (clockwise from north) the island of Corsica, the Italian Peninsula, Sicily, Tunisia, the Balearic Islands, and Provence. The Tyrrhenian Sea portion of the Mediterranean Sea is directly to the east of Sardinia between the Sardinian east coast and the west coast of the Italian mainland peninsula. The Strait of Bonifacio is directly north of Sardinia and separates Sardinia from the French island of Corsica.

The coast of Sardinia is 1,849 km (1,149 mi) long. It is generally high and rocky, with long, relatively straight stretches, outstanding headlands, wide, deep bays, rias, and inlets with various smaller islands.

The island has an ancient geoformation and, unlike Sicily and mainland Italy, is not earthquake-prone. Its rocks date in fact from the Palaeozoic Era. The Cambrian-Lower Ordovician succession of Sardinia reaches 1500–3000 m in thickness. Due to long erosion processes, the island's highlands, formed of granite, schist, trachyte, basalt (called jaras or gollei), sandstone and dolomite limestone (called tonneri or 'heels'), average at between 300 and 1,000 m (984 and 3,281 ft). The highest peak is Punta La Marmora (Perdas Carpìas in Sardinian language) (1,834 m (6,017 ft)), part of the Gennargentu Ranges in the centre of the island. Other mountain chains are Monte Limbara (1,362 m (4,469 ft)) in the northeast, the Chain of Marghine and Goceano (1,259 m (4,131 ft)) running crosswise for 40 km (25 mi) towards the north, the Monte Albo (1,057 m (3,468 ft)), the Sette Fratelli Range in the southeast, and the Sulcis Mountains and the Monte Linas (1,236 m (4,055 ft)). The island's ranges and plateaux are separated by wide alluvial valleys and flatlands, the main ones being the Campidano in the southwest between Oristano and Cagliari and the Nurra in the northwest.

Sardinia has few major rivers, the largest being the Tirso, 151 km (94 mi) long, which flows into the Sea of Sardinia, the Coghinas (115 km (71 mi)) and the Flumendosa (127 km (79 mi)). There are 54 artificial lakes and dams that supply water and electricity. The main ones are Lake Omodeo and Lake Coghinas. The only natural freshwater lake is Lago di Baratz. A number of large, shallow, salt-water lagoons and pools are located along the coast.

=== Climate ===
Sardinia average rainfalls

The climate of the island is variable from area to area, due to several factors including the extension in latitude and the elevation. It can be classified in two different macrobioclimates (Mediterranean pluviseasonal oceanic and Temperate oceanic), one macrobioclimatic variant (Submediterranean), and four classes of continentality (from weak semihyperoceanic to weak semicontinental), eight thermotypic horizons (from lower thermomediterranean to upper supratemperate), and seven ombrotypic horizons (from lower dry to lower hyperhumid), resulting in a combination of 43 different isobioclimates.

During the year there is a major concentration of rainfall in the winter and autumn, some heavy showers in the spring and snowfalls in the highlands. The average temperature is between 11 and 18 °C (52 and 64 °F), with mild winters and warm summers on the coasts (9 to 16 °C (48 to 61 °F) in January, 23 to 31 °C (73 to 88 °F) in July), and cold winters and cool summers on the mountains (−2 to 4 °C (28 to 39 °F) in January, 16 to 20 °C (61 to 68 °F) in July).

Rainfall has a Mediterranean distribution all over the island, with almost totally rainless summers and wet autumns, winters and springs. However, in summer, the rare rainfalls can be characterized by short but severe thunderstorms, which can cause flash floods. The climate is also heavily influenced by the vicinity of the Gulf of Genoa (barometric low) and the relative proximity of the Atlantic Ocean. Low pressures in autumn can generate the formation of the so-called Medicanes, extratropical cyclones which affect the Mediterranean basin. In 2013, the island was hit by several cyclones, included the Cyclone Cleopatra, which dumped 450 mm (18 in) of rainfall within an hour and a half.

Sardinia being relatively large and hilly, weather is not uniform; in particular the East is drier, but paradoxically it suffers the worst rainstorms: in autumn 2009, it rained more than 200 mm (7.9 in) in a single day in Siniscola, and 19 November 2013, locations in Sardinia were reported to have received more than 431 mm (17.0 in) within two hours. The western coast has a higher distribution of rainfalls even for modest elevations (for instance Iglesias, elevation 200 m (656 ft), average annual precipitation 815 mm (32.1 in)). The driest part of the island is the coast of Cagliari gulf, with less than 450 mm (17.7 in) per year, the minimum is at Capo Carbonara at the extreme south-east of the island 381 mm (15.0 in), and the wettest is the top of the Gennargentu mountain with almost 1,500 mm (59.1 in) per year. The average for the entire island is about 800 mm (31.5 in) per year, which is more than enough for the needs of the population and vegetation. The Mistral from the northwest is the dominant wind on and off throughout the year, though it is most prevalent in winter and spring. It can blow quite strongly, but it is usually dry and cool.

Climate data for Cagliari (Elmas Airport), elevation: 4 m (13 ft), 1991–2020 normals, extremes 1981–2020
Month	Jan	Feb	Mar	Apr	May	Jun	Jul	Aug	Sep	Oct	Nov	Dec	Year
Record high °C (°F)	21.0 (69.8)	23.8 (74.8)	26.2 (79.2)	29.0 (84.2)	34.6 (94.3)	39.0 (102.2)	44.6 (112.3)	41.8 (107.2)	35.9 (96.6)	31.8 (89.2)	26.4 (79.5)	23.4 (74.1)	44.6 (112.3)
Mean daily maximum °C (°F)	14.7 (58.5)	15.0 (59.0)	17.5 (63.5)	19.9 (67.8)	24.1 (75.4)	28.7 (83.7)	31.7 (89.1)	32.1 (89.8)	28.1 (82.6)	23.9 (75.0)	19.0 (66.2)	15.7 (60.3)	22.5 (72.6)
Daily mean °C (°F)	10.0 (50.0)	10.0 (50.0)	12.4 (54.3)	14.8 (58.6)	18.7 (65.7)	23.0 (73.4)	25.7 (78.3)	26.2 (79.2)	22.7 (72.9)	18.8 (65.8)	14.5 (58.1)	11.2 (52.2)	17.3 (63.2)
Mean daily minimum °C (°F)	5.4 (41.7)	5.1 (41.2)	7.3 (45.1)	9.7 (49.5)	13.3 (55.9)	17.3 (63.1)	19.9 (67.8)	20.5 (68.9)	17.5 (63.5)	13.9 (57.0)	10.0 (50.0)	6.8 (44.2)	12.2 (54.0)
Record low °C (°F)	−4.8 (23.4)	−3.2 (26.2)	−2.2 (28.0)	−0.4 (31.3)	4.8 (40.6)	8.8 (47.8)	11.8 (53.2)	12.6 (54.7)	9.0 (48.2)	2.6 (36.7)	−2.0 (28.4)	−3.4 (25.9)	−4.8 (23.4)
Average precipitation mm (inches)	37.1 (1.46)	33.9 (1.33)	32.1 (1.26)	45.6 (1.80)	26.2 (1.03)	12.5 (0.49)	3.10 (0.12)	11.4 (0.45)	38.5 (1.52)	43.9 (1.73)	74.0 (2.91)	54.9 (2.16)	413.2 (16.26)
Average precipitation days (≥ 1.0 mm)	6.5	5.8	5.7	6.4	4.2	2.2	0.6	1.4	4.2	5.3	8.3	8.0	58.6
Average relative humidity (%)	77.7	73.4	71.4	69.8	67.8	63.5	61.3	62.7	66.7	71.6	76.3	77.9	70.0
Mean monthly sunshine hours	155.0	166.0	217.6	222.6	271.3	312.3	339.8	314.0	240.3	199.3	150.3	140.7	2,729.2
Source 1: NCEI.NOAA
Source 2: Meteo Climat, Servizio Meteorologico and WeatherBase

Climate data for Fonni, elevation 1,029 m (3,376 ft)
Month	Jan	Feb	Mar	Apr	May	Jun	Jul	Aug	Sep	Oct	Nov	Dec	Year
Mean daily maximum °C (°F)	6.6 (43.9)	6.9 (44.4)	8.9 (48.0)	11.5 (52.7)	16.3 (61.3)	21.2 (70.2)	25.8 (78.4)	25.5 (77.9)	21.7 (71.1)	16.4 (61.5)	10.9 (51.6)	8.1 (46.6)	15.0 (59.0)
Daily mean °C (°F)	4.1 (39.4)	4.1 (39.4)	5.7 (42.3)	8.1 (46.6)	12.4 (54.3)	16.9 (62.4)	21.1 (70.0)	20.9 (69.6)	17.7 (63.9)	13.1 (55.6)	8.2 (46.8)	5.5 (41.9)	11.5 (52.7)
Mean daily minimum °C (°F)	1.5 (34.7)	1.2 (34.2)	2.5 (36.5)	4.6 (40.3)	8.5 (47.3)	12.6 (54.7)	16.4 (61.5)	16.3 (61.3)	13.7 (56.7)	9.7 (49.5)	5.4 (41.7)	2.8 (37.0)	7.9 (46.2)
Average rainfall mm (inches)	97 (3.8)	118 (4.6)	110 (4.3)	88 (3.5)	73 (2.9)	33 (1.3)	11 (0.4)	18 (0.7)	40 (1.6)	93 (3.7)	107 (4.2)	131 (5.2)	919 (36.2)
Average rainy days (≥ 1.0 mm)	9.9	10.0	9.4	10.5	7.4	4.2	—	2.4	4.8	8.8	9.7	9.9	88.6
Source: Servizio Meteorologico

Climate data for Capo Frasca (1991–2020 normals)
Month	Jan	Feb	Mar	Apr	May	Jun	Jul	Aug	Sep	Oct	Nov	Dec	Year
Mean daily maximum °C (°F)	13.4 (56.1)	13.2 (55.8)	15.2 (59.4)	17.7 (63.9)	21.3 (70.3)	25.6 (78.1)	28.5 (83.3)	29.2 (84.6)	26.2 (79.2)	22.8 (73.0)	18.0 (64.4)	14.6 (58.3)	20.5 (68.9)
Daily mean °C (°F)	10.6 (51.1)	10.4 (50.7)	12.1 (53.8)	14.5 (58.1)	17.8 (64.0)	22.0 (71.6)	24.8 (76.6)	25.4 (77.7)	22.7 (72.9)	19.4 (66.9)	15.1 (59.2)	12.0 (53.6)	17.2 (63.0)
Mean daily minimum °C (°F)	7.9 (46.2)	7.5 (45.5)	9.0 (48.2)	11.3 (52.3)	14.4 (57.9)	18.5 (65.3)	21.2 (70.2)	21.8 (71.2)	19.2 (66.6)	16.0 (60.8)	12.2 (54.0)	9.3 (48.7)	14.0 (57.2)
Average precipitation mm (inches)	49.0 (1.93)	55.1 (2.17)	40.3 (1.59)	47.8 (1.88)	41.0 (1.61)	15.2 (0.60)	3.6 (0.14)	8.0 (0.31)	38.6 (1.52)	67.3 (2.65)	92.3 (3.63)	73.9 (2.91)	532.1 (20.94)
Average precipitation days (≥ 1.0 mm)	8	8	6.5	6.37	5.22	1.93	0.61	1.37	3.62	7	9.2	9.6	67.42
Average relative humidity (%)	85.37	83.02	82.79	82.27	80.77	79.25	79.28	78.04	79.23	82.05	83.58	85.31	81.75

Climate data for Vallermosa (1981–2010)
Month	Jan	Feb	Mar	Apr	May	Jun	Jul	Aug	Sep	Oct	Nov	Dec	Year
Mean daily maximum °C (°F)	15.4 (59.7)	16.4 (61.5)	19.2 (66.6)	21.3 (70.3)	26.4 (79.5)	31.5 (88.7)	34.9 (94.8)	35.3 (95.5)	30.1 (86.2)	25.5 (77.9)	19.6 (67.3)	16.0 (60.8)	24.3 (75.7)
Mean daily minimum °C (°F)	4.5 (40.1)	4.5 (40.1)	6.3 (43.3)	8.4 (47.1)	12.3 (54.1)	16.2 (61.2)	18.7 (65.7)	19.4 (66.9)	16.9 (62.4)	13.9 (57.0)	9.1 (48.4)	5.9 (42.6)	11.3 (52.3)
Average precipitation mm (inches)	63.8 (2.51)	62.1 (2.44)	48.7 (1.92)	55.3 (2.18)	29.2 (1.15)	13.8 (0.54)	4.2 (0.17)	12.1 (0.48)	41.2 (1.62)	54.4 (2.14)	88.9 (3.50)	82.0 (3.23)	555.8 (21.88)
Source: Climatologia della Sardegna per il trentennio 1981–2010

=== Environment ===
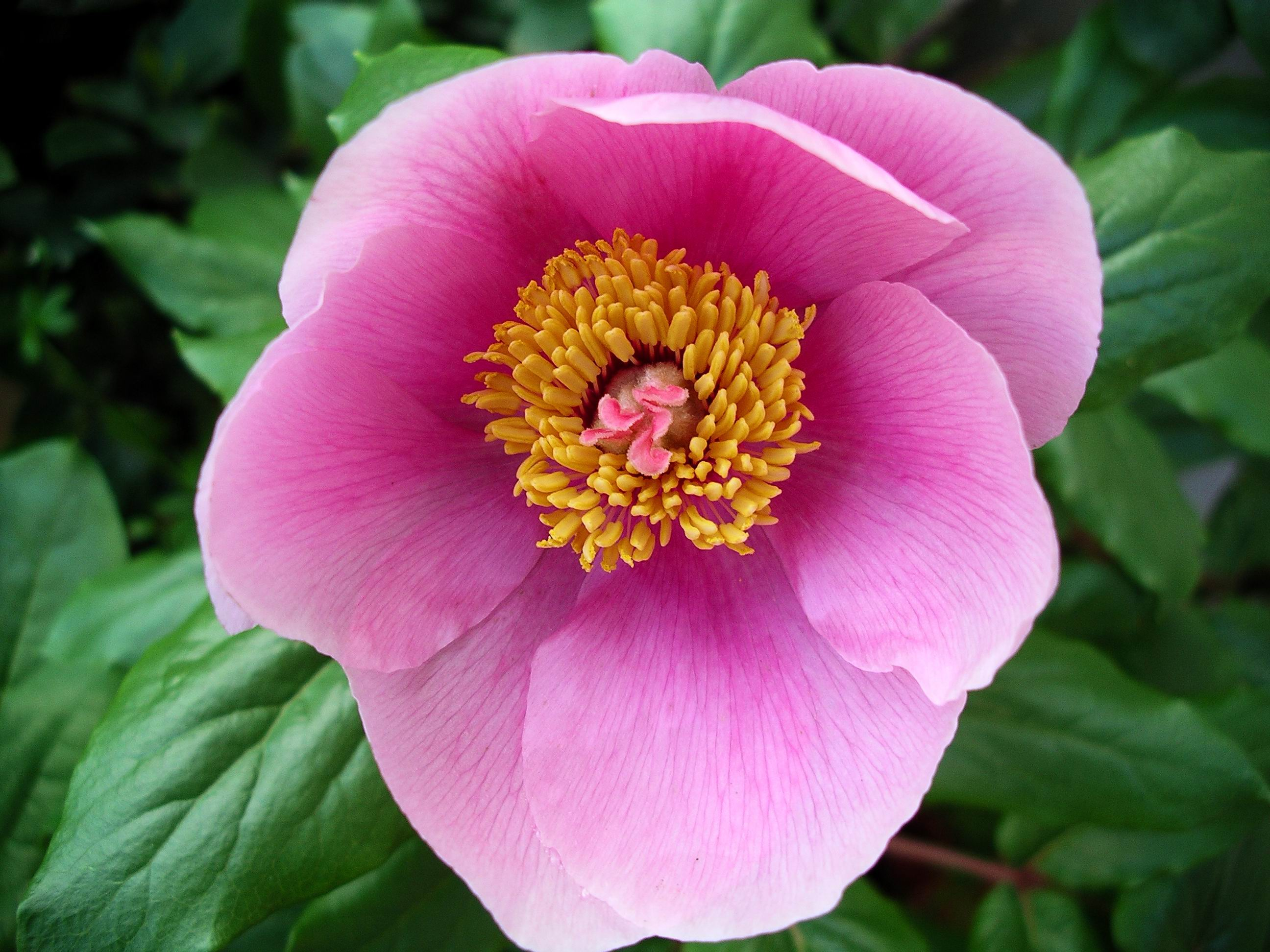
Paeonia mascula

Following an enormous reforestation plan Sardinia has become the Italian region with the largest forest extension. 1,213,250 hectares (12,132 km^{2}) or 50% of the island is covered by forested areas. The Corpo forestale e di vigilanza ambientale della Regione Sarda is the Sardinian Forestry Corps. Sardinia is one of the regions in Italy which are most affected by forest fires during the summer.

The Regional Landscape Plan prohibits new building activities on the coast (except in urban centers), next to forests, lakes or other environmental or cultural sites and the Coastal conservation agency ensures the protection of natural areas on the Sardinian coast.

Renewable energies have increased noticeably in recent years, mainly wind power, favoured by the windy climate, but also solar power and biofuel, based on jatropha oil and colza oil. 586.8 megawatts of wind power capacity were installed on the island at the end of 2009.

==== Flora and fauna ====
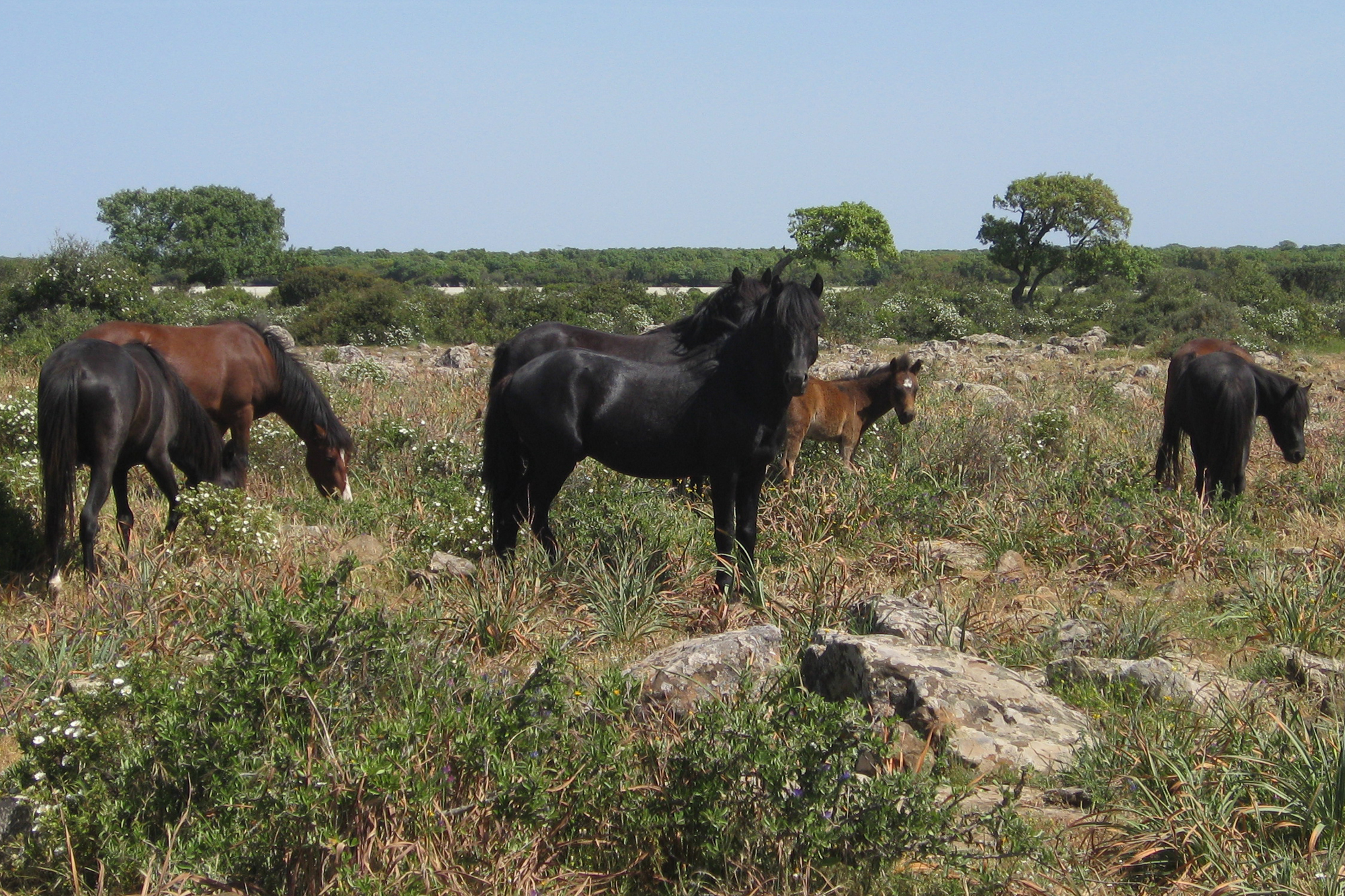
Giara horses

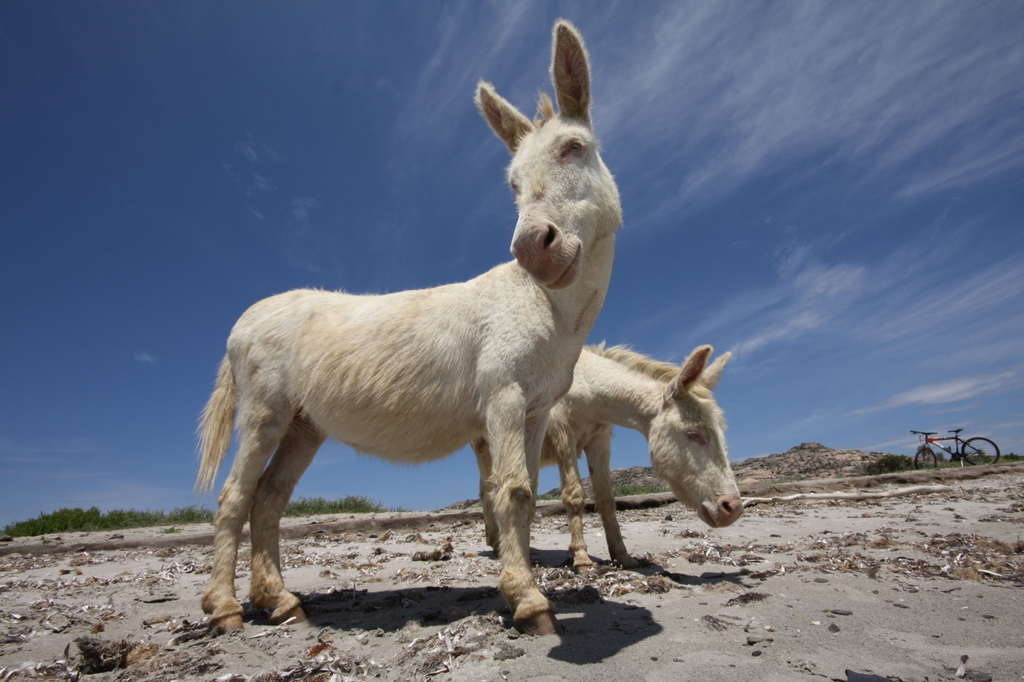
Albino donkeys in Asinara

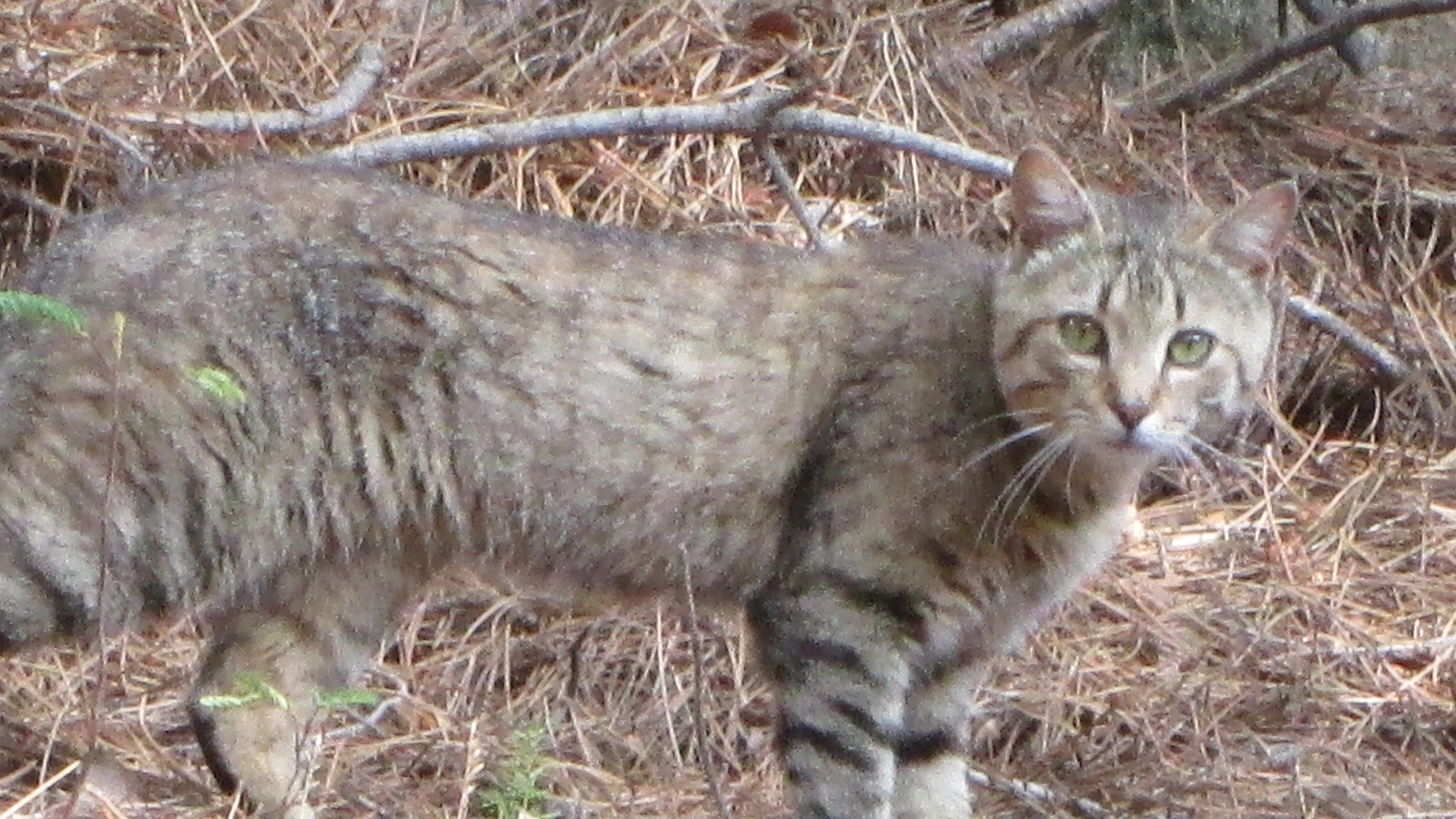
The Sardinian feral cat, long considered a subspecies of the African wildcat, are descended from domesticated cats.

Due to Sardinia's continual isolation from mainland Europe even during glacial sea level lows (when it was connected to Corsica), Sardinia has a high level of endemism, with regards to both flora and fauna, including insects and arachnids, as well as terrestrial vertebrates, with endemic amphibians (including those also found on Corsica) including the Sardinian brook salamander, brown cave salamander, imperial cave salamander, Monte Albo cave salamander, Supramonte cave salamander, Sarrabus' cave salamander and the Sardinian tree frog (also found in Corsica), with lizards endemic to the archipelago including Bedriaga's rock lizard, the Tyrrhenian wall lizard and Fitzinger's algyroides.

During the Late Pleistocene, Sardinia and Corsica had a highly endemic terrestrial mammal fauna, all of which is now extinct, which included a field mouse (Rhagamys orthodon), a vole (Microtus henseli), a shrew (Asoriculus similis), a mole (Talpa tyrrhenica), a dwarf mammoth (Mammuthus lamarmorai), the Sardinian pika (Prolagus sardus), a jackal-sized canine, the Sardinian dhole (Cynotherium sardus), a mustelid (Enhydrictis galictoides), three species of otter (Algarolutra majori, Sardolutra ichnusae, and the gigantic Megalenhydris barbaricina) and a deer (Praemegaceros cazioti). Some of these animals were extinct by the beginning of the Holocene, with the deer species suggested to have persisted until around 7,600 years ago, and the shrew into the Neolithic, while the Sardinian pika, vole and field mouse are suggested to have persisted until around 3000–2000 years ago. The Sardinian pika in particular was historically abundant on the island, and was used by early inhabitants as a source of food. On the present-day island, its fauna includes a variety of introduced mammal species, such as the Corsican red deer.

The island is inhabited by terrestrial tortoises and sea turtles like Hermann's tortoise, the spur-thighed tortoise, marginated tortoise (Testudo marginata sarda), Nabeul tortoise, loggerhead sea turtle and green sea turtle. Some birds of prey found here are the griffon vulture, common buzzard, golden eagle, long-eared owl, western marsh harrier, peregrine falcon, European honey buzzard, Sardinian goshawk (Accipiter gentilis arrigonii), Bonelli's eagle and Eleonora's falcon, whose name comes from Eleonor of Arborea, national heroine of Sardinia, expert in falconry. The hundreds of lagoons and coastal lakes that dot the island are home for many species of wading birds, such as the greater flamingo. Conversely, Sardinia lacks many species common on the European continent, such as the viper, wolf, bear and marmot. The island has also long been used for grazing flocks of indigenous Sardinian sheep. The Sardinian Anglo-Arab is a horse breed that was established in Sardinia, where it has been selectively bred for more than one hundred years. Three different breeds of dogs are peculiar to Sardinia: the Sardinian Shepherd Dog, the Dogo Sardesco and the Levriero Sardo.

==== Natural parks and reserves ====
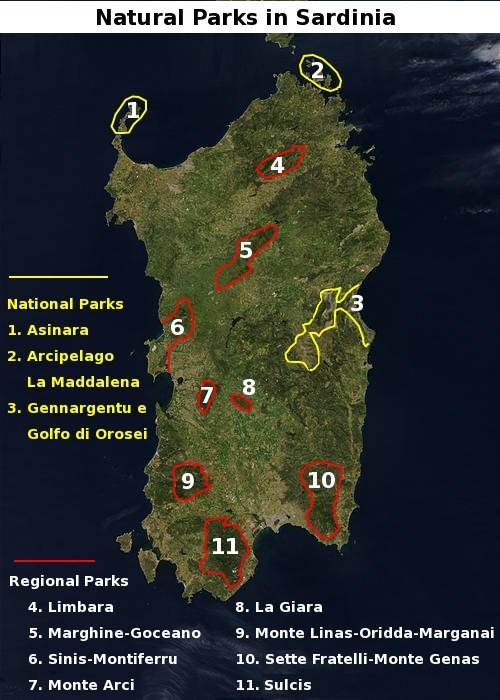
National and regional parks of Sardinia

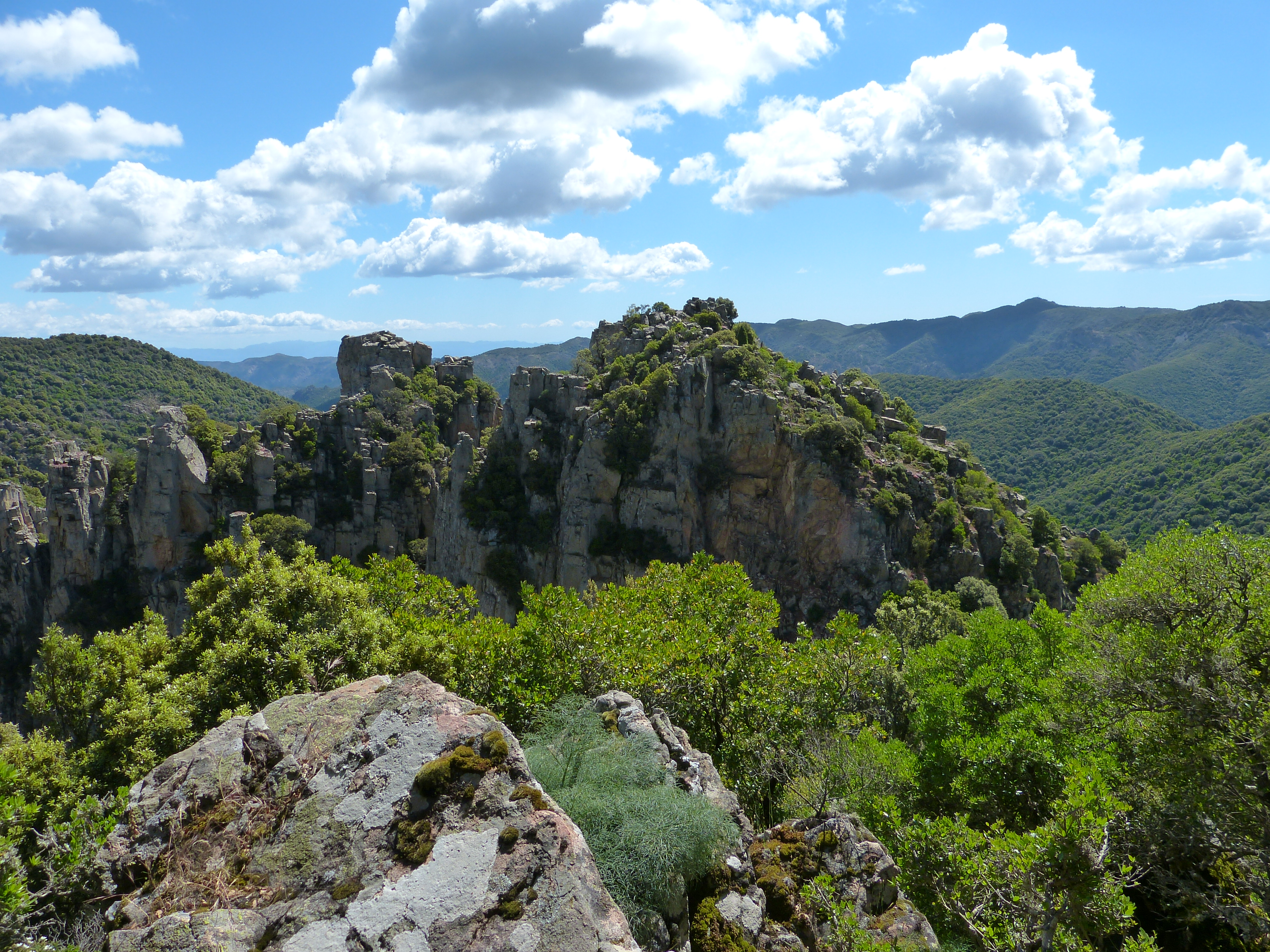
Sulcis Regional Park, the largest Mediterranean evergreen forest in the Mediterranean Basin.

Over 600,000 hectares (1,500,000 acres) of Sardinian territory is environmentally preserved (about 25% of the island's territory).

The island has three national parks:

- 1. Asinara National Park,
- 2. Arcipelago di La Maddalena National Park, and
- 3. Gennargentu National Park.

The numbers correspond to those in the map to right.

Ten regional parks:

- 4. Parco del Limbara
- 5. Parco del Marghine e Goceano
- 6. Parco del Sinis – Montiferru
- 7. Parco di Monte Arci
- 8. Parco della Giara di Gesturi
- 9. Parco di Monte Linas – Oridda – Marganai
- 10. Parco dei Sette Fratelli – Monte Genas
- 11. Parco del Sulcis
- Parco naturale regionale di Porto Conte
- Parco regionale Molentargius – Saline

There are 60 wildlife reserves, 5 W.W.F oases, 25 natural monuments and one Geomineral Park, preserved by UNESCO.

Northern Sardinian Coasts are included in the Pelagos Sanctuary for Mediterranean Marine Mammals, a Marine Protected Area, that covers a surface of about 84,000 km^{2} (32,433 sq mi), aimed at the protection of marine mammals.

== Demographics ==
Historical population
Year	Pop.	±%
1485	157,578	—
1603	266,676	+69.2%
1678	299,356	+12.3%
1688	229,532	−23.3%
1698	259,157	+12.9%
1728	311,902	+20.4%
1751	360,805	+15.7%
1771	360,785	−0.0%
1776	422,647	+17.1%
1781	431,897	+2.2%
1821	461,931	+7.0%
1824	469,831	+1.7%
1838	525,485	+11.8%
1844	544,253	+3.6%
1848	554,717	+1.9%
1857	573,243	+3.3%
1861	609,015	+6.2%
1871	636,413	+4.5%
1881	680,450	+6.9%
1901	795,793	+17.0%
1911	868,181	+9.1%
1921	885,487	+2.0%
1931	983,760	+11.1%
1936	1,034,206	+5.1%
1951	1,276,023	+23.4%
1961	1,419,362	+11.2%
1971	1,473,800	+3.8%
1981	1,594,175	+8.2%
1991	1,648,248	+3.4%
2001	1,631,880	−1.0%
2011	1,639,362	+0.5%
2021	1,587,413	−3.2%
Source: D.Angioni-S.Loi-G.Puggioni, La popolazione dei comuni sardi dal 1688 al 1991, CUEC, Cagliari, 1997 – F. Corridore, Storia documentata della popolazione di Sardegna, Carlo Clausen, Torino, 1902, ISTAT

As of 2026, the population is 1,554,490, of which 49.2% are male, and 50.8% are female. Minors make up 12.0% of the population, and seniors make up 28.1%.

With a population density of 65/km^{2}, slightly less than a third of the national average, Sardinia is the fourth least-populated region in Italy. In the recent past the population distribution was similar to that of other Italian coastal regions. In fact, contrary to the general trend, most urban settlement, with the exception of the fortified cities of Cagliari, Alghero, Castelsardo and few others, has taken place not primarily along the coast but in the subcoastal areas and towards the centre of the island. Historical reasons for this include the repeated Saracen raids during the Middle Ages and then Barbary raids until the early 19th century which made the coast unsafe, widespread pastoral activities inland, and the swampy nature of the coastal plains, which were reclaimed definitively only in the 20th century. The situation has been reversed with the expansion of seaside tourism; all of Sardinia's major urban centres are now located near the coasts, and the island's interior is very sparsely populated.

At 1.087 births per woman, Sardinia has the lowest total fertility rate of any Italian region, and the second lowest birth rate in Italy, which is already one of the lowest in the world. Combined with the rapid aging of the population—in 2009, 18.7% of the population were older than 65—rural depopulation is a significant issue: between 1991 and 2001, 71.4% of Sardinian villages lost population (32 more than 20% and 115 between 10% and 20%), with over 30 at risk of becoming ghost towns. It is predicted that at that rate Sardinia will be the European island with the second-lowest population density, immediately after Iceland, by 2080.

Nonetheless, the overall population estimate has remained relatively stable because of a considerable immigration flow, mainly from the Italian mainland but also from Eastern Europe (especially Romania), Africa and Asia.

=== Life expectancy ===
Average life expectancy is slightly over 82 years (85 for women and 79.7 for men). Sardinia shares with the Japanese island of Okinawa the highest rate of centenarians in the world (22 centenarians per 100,000 inhabitants). Sardinia is the first discovered Blue Zone, a demographic or geographic area in the world with an oversize concentration of centenarians and supercentenarians.

=== Immigration ===
As of 2025, immigrants make up 5.2% of the population. The 5 largest foreign countries of birth are Romania, Germany, France, Morocco, and Senegal.

Foreign population by country of birth (2025)
Country of birth	Population
Romania	10,683
Germany	7,411
France	4,929
Morocco	4,696
Senegal	4,259
Ukraine	3,578
Switzerland	2,975
China	2,347
Pakistan	2,249
Argentina	2,214
Belgium	2,084
Bangladesh	2,054
Brazil	1,916
Philippines	1,721
United Kingdom	1,679

=== Main cities and Functional Urban Areas ===
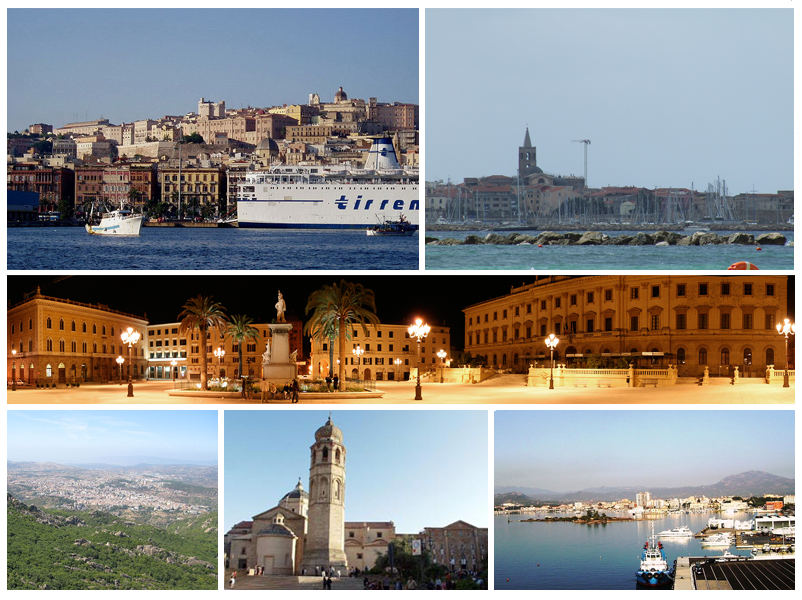
Cagliari, Alghero, Sassari, Nuoro, Oristano, Olbia

Sardinia's most populated cities are Cagliari and Sassari. The Metropolitan City of Cagliari has 431,302 inhabitants, or about a quarter of the population of the entire island. Eurostat has identified in Sardinia two Functional Urban Areas: Cagliari, with 477,000 inhabitants, and Sassari, with 222,000 inhabitants.

Municipality	Province	Population (2026)	Density (inh./km^{2})
Cagliari / Casteddu (Sardinian)	Cagliari (metropolitan city)	145,981	1,717.2
Sassari / Sassari (Sassarese) / Tatari (Sardinian)	Sassari (metropolitan city)	120,231	219.8
Quartu Sant'Elena / Cuartu Sant'Aleni (Sardinian)	Cagliari (metropolitan city)	67,869	704.0
Olbia / Terranoa (Sardinian) / Tarranoa (Gallurese)	Gallura North-East Sardinia	61,739	160.9
Alghero / L'Alguer (Catalan)	Sassari (metropolitan city)	41,765	185.3
Nuoro / Nùgoro (Sardinian)	Nuoro	32,718	170.4
Oristano / Aristanis (Sardinian)	Oristano	29,888	353.4
Selargius / Ceraxius (Sardinian)	Cagliari (metropolitan city)	28,272	1,060.1
Assemini / Assèmini (Sardinian)	Cagliari (metropolitan city)	25,575	216.4
Carbonia / Crabònia (Sardinian)	Sulcis Iglesiente	25,353	174.2
Iglesias / Igrèsias or Bidd'e Cresia (Sardinian)	Sulcis Iglesiente	24,409	117.2
Capoterra / Cabuderra (Sardinian)	Cagliari (metropolitan city)	23,015	336.0
Sestu (Sardinian)	Cagliari (metropolitan city)	20,630	427.2
Porto Torres / Posthudorra (Sassarese)	Sassari (metropolitan city)	20,624	197.5
Monserrato / Pauli (Sardinian)	Cagliari (metropolitan city)	18,624	2,896.4

== Government and politics ==
Sardinia is one of the five Italian autonomous regions, along with the Aosta Valley, Trentino-Alto Adige/Südtirol, Friuli-Venezia Giulia and Sicily. Its particular statute, which in itself is a constitutional law, gives the region a limited degree of autonomy, entailing the right to carry out the administrative functions of the local body and to create its own laws in a strictly defined number of domains.

Provinces of Sardinia

The regional administration is constituted by three authorities:

- the Regional Council (legislative power)
- the Regional Junta (executive power)
- the President (chief of executive power)

=== Administrative divisions ===
Since 2025, Sardinia is divided into two metropolitan cities and six provinces:

Province	Population (2026)	Area (km²)	Density (inh./km²)	Municipalities
Cagliari (metropolitan city)	534,219	4,309.21	124.0	70
Gallura North-East Sardinia	159,460	3,406.18	46.8	26
Medio Campidano	89,155	1,517.34	58.8	28
Nuoro	142,241	3,990.47	35.6	53
Ogliastra	53,722	1,854.55	29.0	23
Oristano	146,785	2,990.45	49.1	87
Sassari (metropolitan city)	311,128	4,285.91	72.6	66
Sulcis Iglesiente	117,780	1,745.90	67.5	24

In April 2021, under Sardinian Regional Council's Regional Law Nr. 7, Sardinian administrative divisions were reorganized; the former provinces of Olbia-Tempio (now bearing the name Gallura-North East Sardinia), Ogliastra, Medio Campidano and Carbonia-Iglesias (now bearing the name Sulcis Iglesiente) were restored, the metropolitan city of Cagliari would be expanded with other municipalities from the to-be eliminated Province of South Sardinia, and the western part of the Province of Sassari would be reorganized into the new metropolitan city of Sassari. Whilst the Italian government challenged the law, thus stalling its implementation, on 12 March 2022, the Constitutional Court ruled in favor of the Autonomous Region of Sardinia. On 13 April 2023, the regional council, at the proposal of the regional government, approved an amendment to the 2021 reform, defining the timeframe and manner of its implementation, which would see its full implementation in 2025.

=== Military installations ===
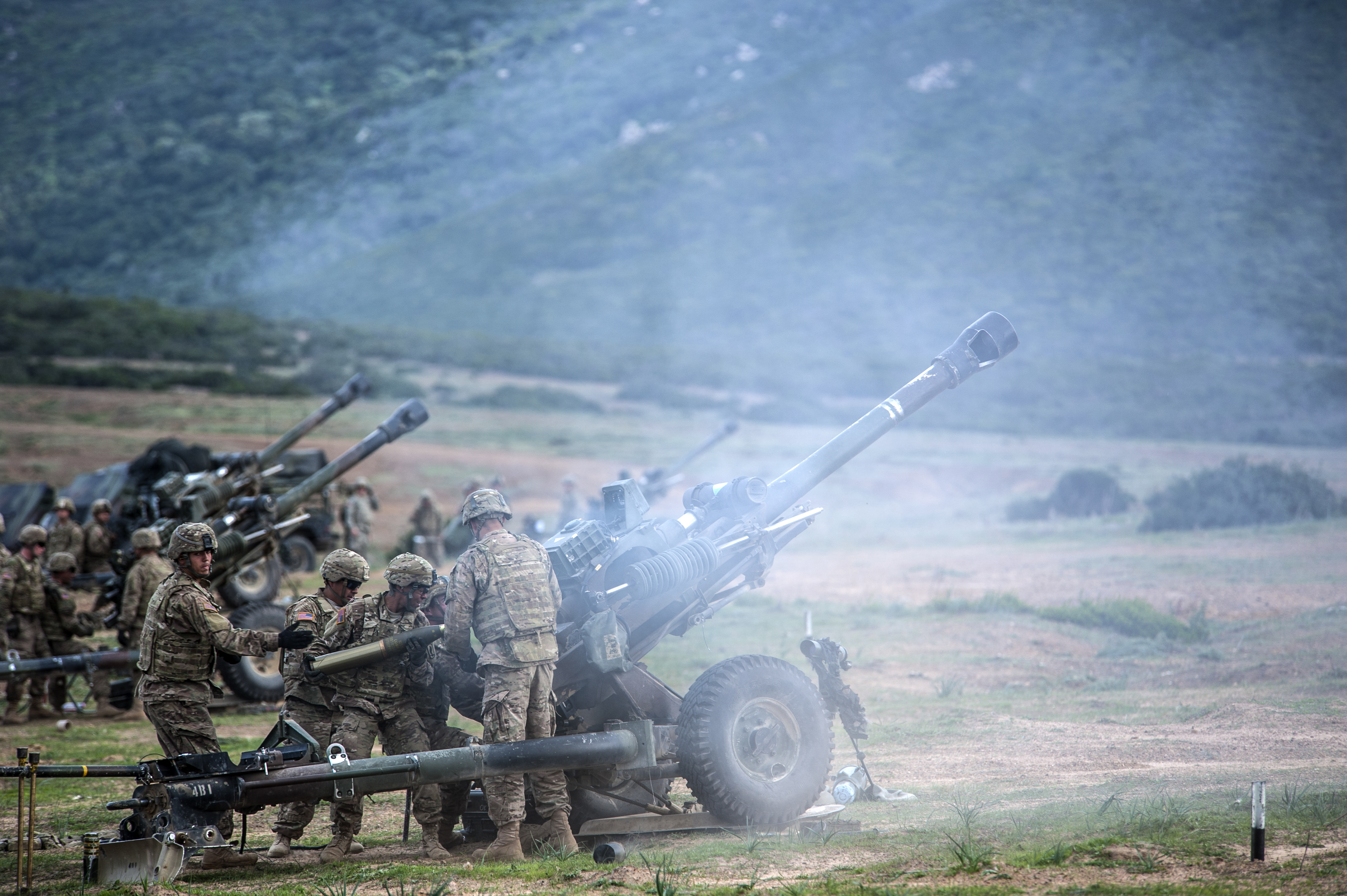
US Artillery Live Fire Exercise in Capo Teulada 2015 during NATO exercise Trident Juncture

Around 60% of all the military installations in Italy are in Sardinia, whose area is less than one-tenth of all the Italian territory and whose population is little more than the 2,5%. The island hosts NATO joint forces and Israeli military forces, which use the island's territory to simulate war games; the Inter-service Test and Training Range of Salto di Quirra (PISQ) is one of the most important experimental military training centres in Europe. The bases, used for manufacturing plants and military testing grounds, totally take up more than 350 km^{2} of the island's land, making Sardinia the most militarized region in Italy and the most militarized island in Europe.

Besides the land-occupying installations, where 80% of the military explosives in Italy are used, there are also other military structures located on the sea and along the coastline, roughly equivalent to 20,000 km^{2} (little less than the island's surface), being made inaccessible to the civil population when military exercises are held.

Among the most notable military bases on the island are the Interagency Polygons in Quirra, Capo Teulada and Capo Frasca, used by Italian and NATO forces to test-fire ballistic missiles and weapons and by Italian and European Space Agency to test space vehicles and for orbital launches. Until 2008, the US navy also had a nuclear submarine base in the Maddalena Archipelago.

Depleted uranium and thorium dust from missile tests has been linked to an increase in cancers according to activists and local politicians. In the late 1980s, a high level of birth defects occurred near the Salto di Quirra weapons testing site after old munitions were destroyed.

== Culture ==
Sardinia is the only autonomous region in Italy where its special Statute uses the term popolo (distinct people) to refer to its inhabitants. While this formula is also used by Veneto, which unlike Sardinia is an ordinary region, the Sardinian Statute is adopted with a constitutional law. In both cases, such term is not meant to imply any legal difference between Sardinians and any other citizen of the country.

=== Architecture ===
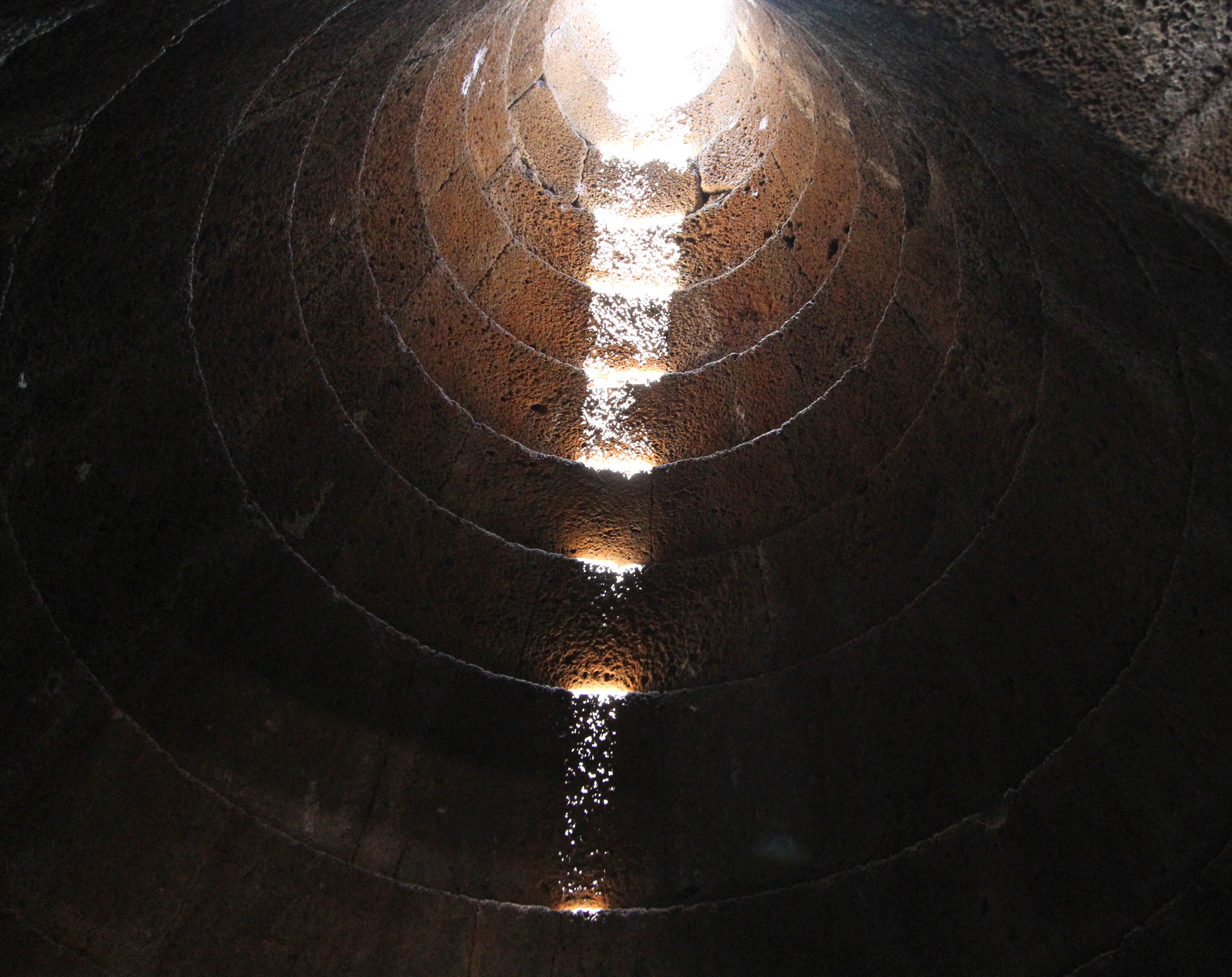
Santa Cristina holy well of Paulilatino, tholos

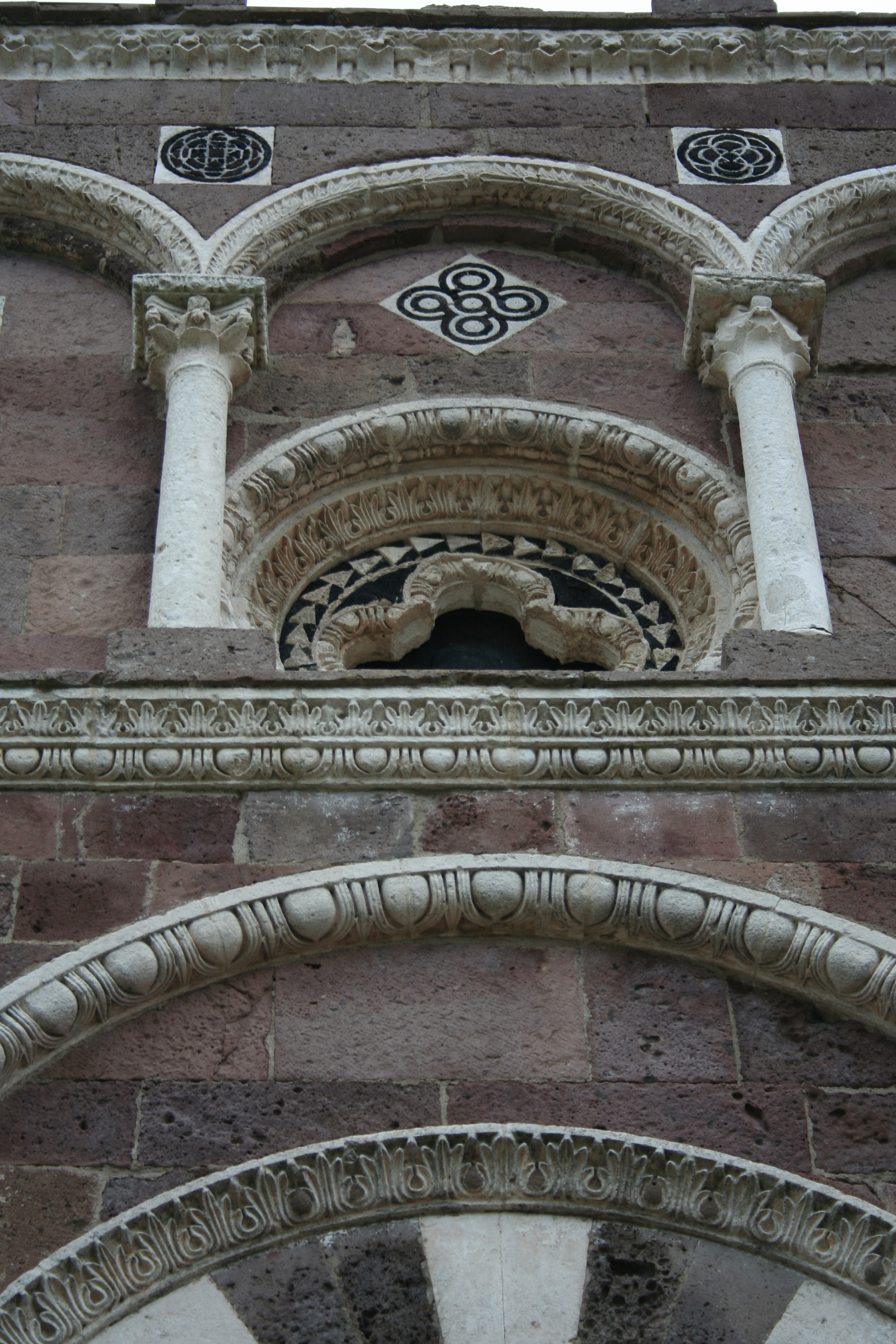
Facade of Nostra Signora di Tergu (SS)

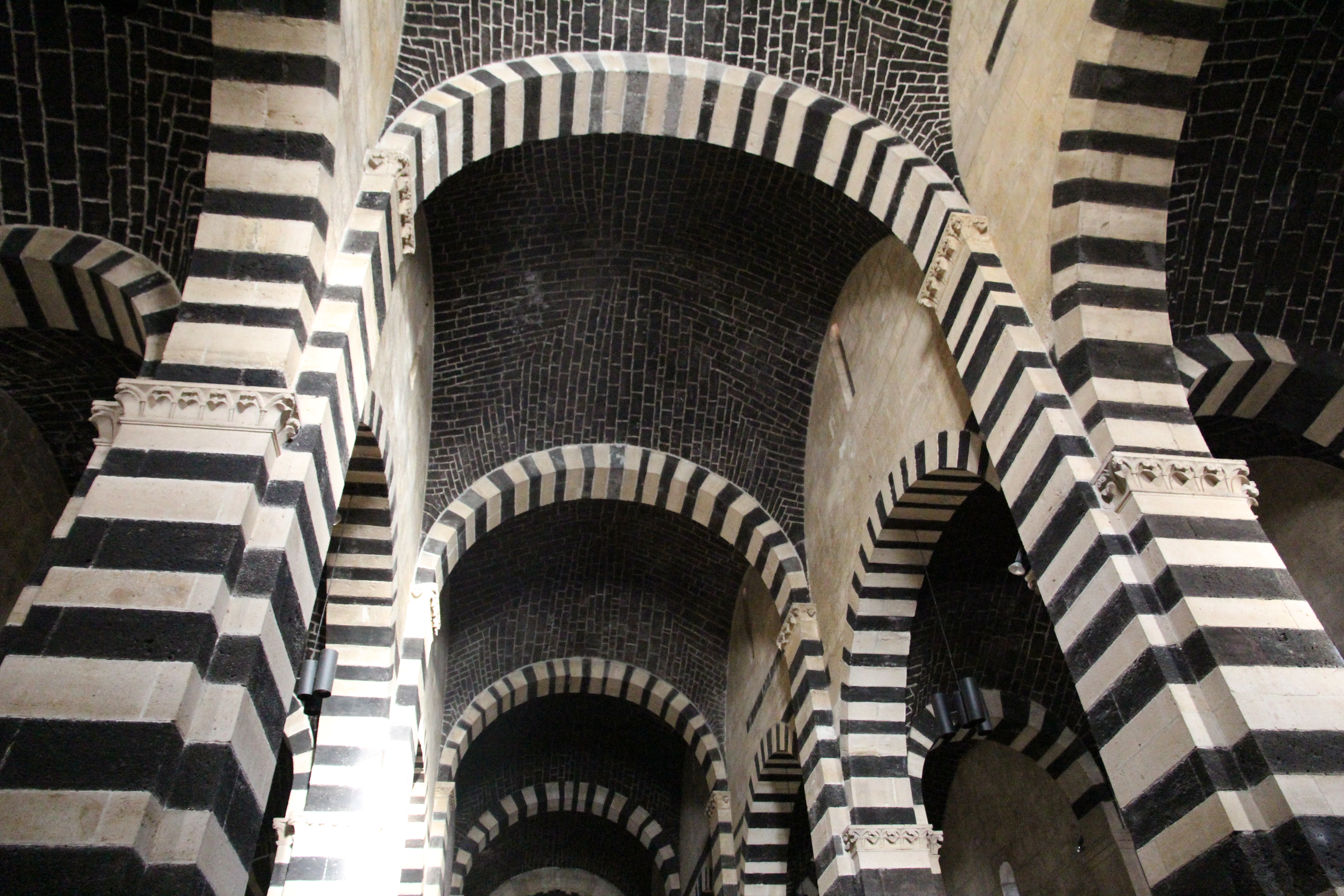
Interior of San Pietro di Sorres, Borutta (SS)

Of the prehistoric architecture in Sardinia there are numerous testimonies such as the domus de janas (hypogeic tombs), the Giants' grave, the megalithic circles, the menhirs, the dolmens and the well temples; however, the element that more than any other characterizes the Sardinian prehistoric landscape are the nuraghe; the remains of thousands of these Bronze Age buildings of various types (simple and complex) are still visible today. There are also numerous traces left by the Phoenicians and Punics who introduced new urban forms on the coasts.

The Romans gave a new administrative structure to the whole island through the restructuring of several cities, the creation of new centers and the construction of many infrastructures of which the ruins remain, such as the palace of Re Barbaro in Porto Torres or the Roman Amphitheatre of Cagliari. Even from the early Christian and Byzantine epoch there are several testimonies throughout the territory both on the coasts and inside, especially linked to buildings of worship.

A particular development had Romanesque architecture during the Judicates period. Starting from 1063 the Sardinian Judges (judikes), through substantial donations, had favored the arrival to the island of monks of different orders from various regions of Italy and France. These circumstances favored in turn the arrival to the island of workers from Pisa, Lombardy, Provence and Muslim Spain, giving rise to unprecedented artistic manifestations, marked by the fusion of these experiences.

The cornerstone in the evolution of Romanesque architectural forms was the basilica of San Gavino in Porto Torres. Among the most relevant examples there are the cathedrals of Sant'Antioco di Bisarcio (Ozieri), San Pietro di Sorres in Borutta, San Nicola di Ottana, the palatine chapel of Santa Maria del Regno of Ardara, the Santa Giusta Cathedral, Nostra Signora di Tergu, the Basilica di Saccargia in Codrongianos and Santa Maria di Uta and, of the 13th century, the cathedrals of Santa Maria di Monserrato (Tratalias) and San Pantaleo (Dolianova). As for military architecture, numerous castles to defend the territory were built during this period. At the beginning of the 14th century date the fortifications and towers of Cagliari, designed by Giovanni Capula.

After their arrival in 1324, the Aragonese concentrated the first realizations in Cagliari; the oldest Catalan Gothic church in Sardinia is the shrine of Our Lady of Bonaria. Also in Cagliari in the same years the Aragonese chapel was built inside the cathedral. In the first half of the fifteenth century a real Gothic jewel was built, the complex of San Domenico, which included the church and the convent, almost completely destroyed during the air raids of 1943, and of which only the cloister remains. Other works were the churches of San Francesco of Stampace (of which only a part of the cloister remains), Sant'Eulalia and San Giacomo. In Alghero in the second half of the fifteenth century the construction of the church of San Francesco and in the sixteenth century of the cathedral began.

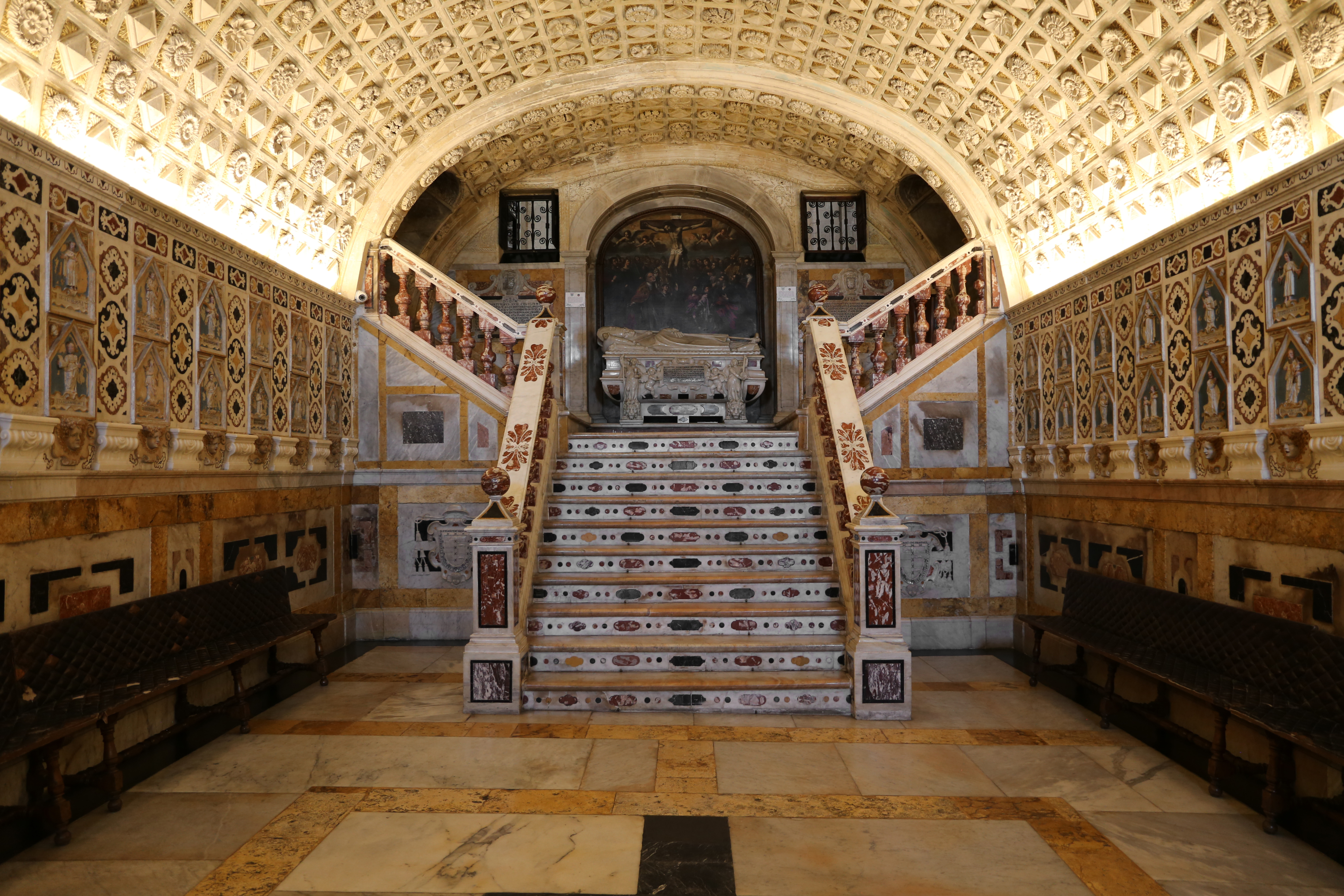
Crypt of the Cagliari Cathedral

Renaissance architecture, although poorly represented, includes notable examples such as the installation of the cathedral of San Nicola di Sassari (late Gothic but with a strong Renaissance influence), the church of Sant'Agostino di Cagliari (designed by Palearo Fratino), the church of Santa Caterina in Sassari (designed by Bernardoni, a pupil of Vignola).

On the contrary, the Baroque architecture has found wide prominence, interesting examples are the Collegiata di Sant'Anna in Cagliari, the facade of the Cathedral of San Nicola in Sassari, the church of San Michele in Cagliari, as well as the cathedral of Cagliari, Ales and Oristano, rebuilt or modified between the seventeenth and eighteenth centuries.

Starting from the nineteenth century, new architectural forms of neoclassical inspiration spread throughout the island. Among the most important figures of this architectural and urban phase is that of the architect from Cagliari Gaetano Cima, whose works are scattered throughout the Sardinian territory. Alongside the works of Cima, it is worth mentioning those of Giuseppe Cominotti (Palazzo and Civic Theater of Sassari) and Antonio Cano (dome of S. Maria di Betlem in Sassari and the cathedral of Santa Maria della Neve in Nuoro). In the second half of the nineteenth century in Sassari was built the neo Gothic palace Giordano (1878) which is one of the earliest examples of revivalism in the island.

An interesting realization of eclectic style, derived from the union between revivalist and Art Nouveau models, appears to be the City hall of Cagliari, completed in the early twentieth century. The advent of fascism has strongly influenced architecture in Sardinia in the twenties and thirties: interesting achievements of that period are the new centers of Fertilia, Arborea and the city of Carbonia, one of the greatest examples of rationalist architecture.

=== Art ===
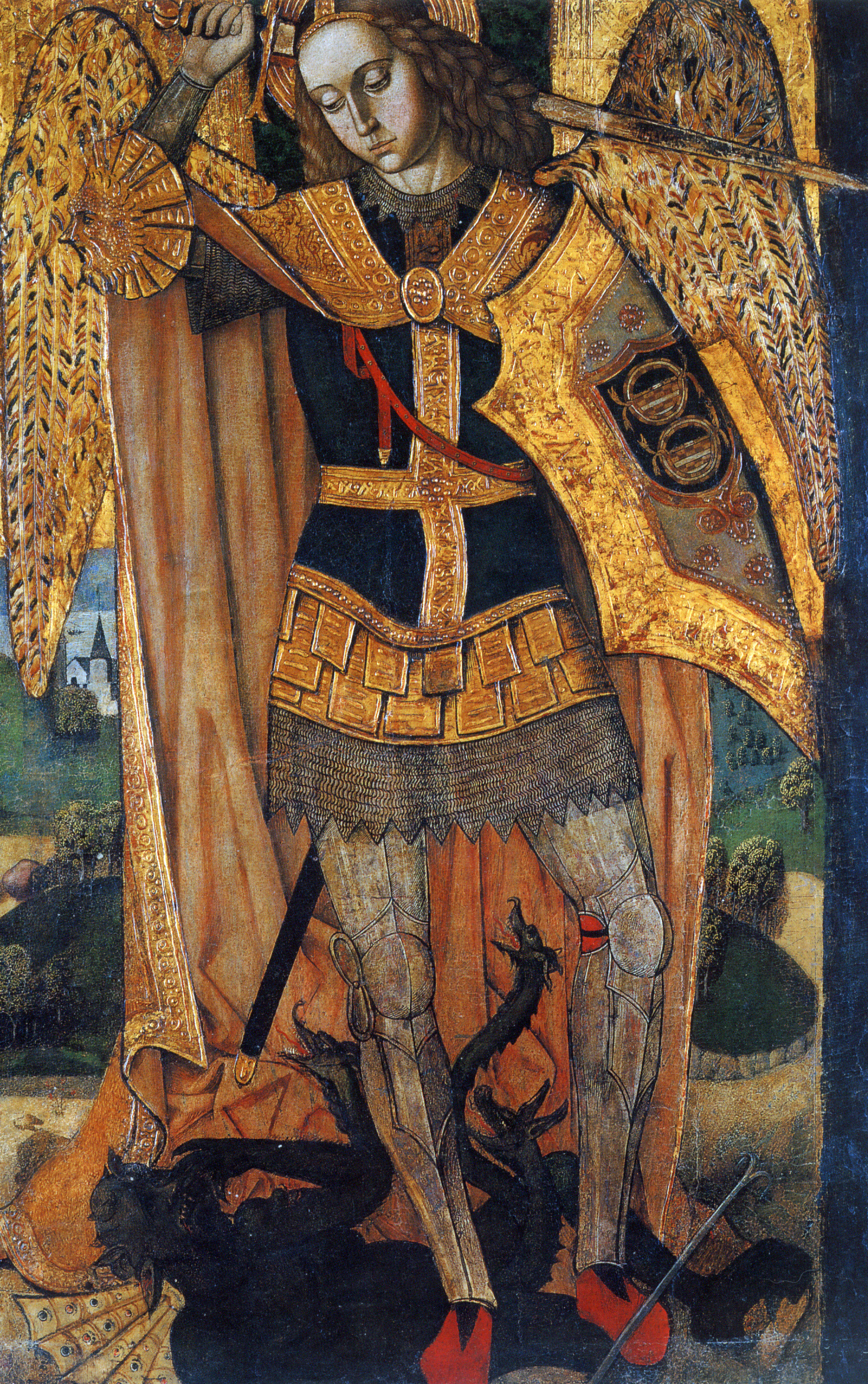
Archangel Michael by the Master of Castelsardo

Numerous findings of the typical statues of the Mother Goddess and pottery engraved with geometric designs testify the artistic expressions of the Pre-Nuragic peoples. Subsequently, the Nuragic civilization produced hundreds of bronze statuettes and the enigmatic stone statuary of the Giants of Mont'e Prama.

The union between the nuragic populations and the merchants coming from every part of the Mediterranean led to a refined production of gold artifacts, rings, earrings and jewelry of all kinds, but also votive steles and wall decorations. In addition to architecture linked to public works, the Romans introduced the mosaics and decorated the rich villas of the patricians with sculptures and paintings.

In the Middle Ages, during the Judicates period, the architecture of the churches were enriched with capitals, sarcophagi, frescoes, marble altars and later embellished with retables, paintings by important artists such as the Master of Castelsardo, Pietro Cavaro, Andrea Lusso, and the school of the so-called Master of Ozieri who was headed by Giovanni del Giglio and Pietro Giovanni Calvano, of Senese origin.

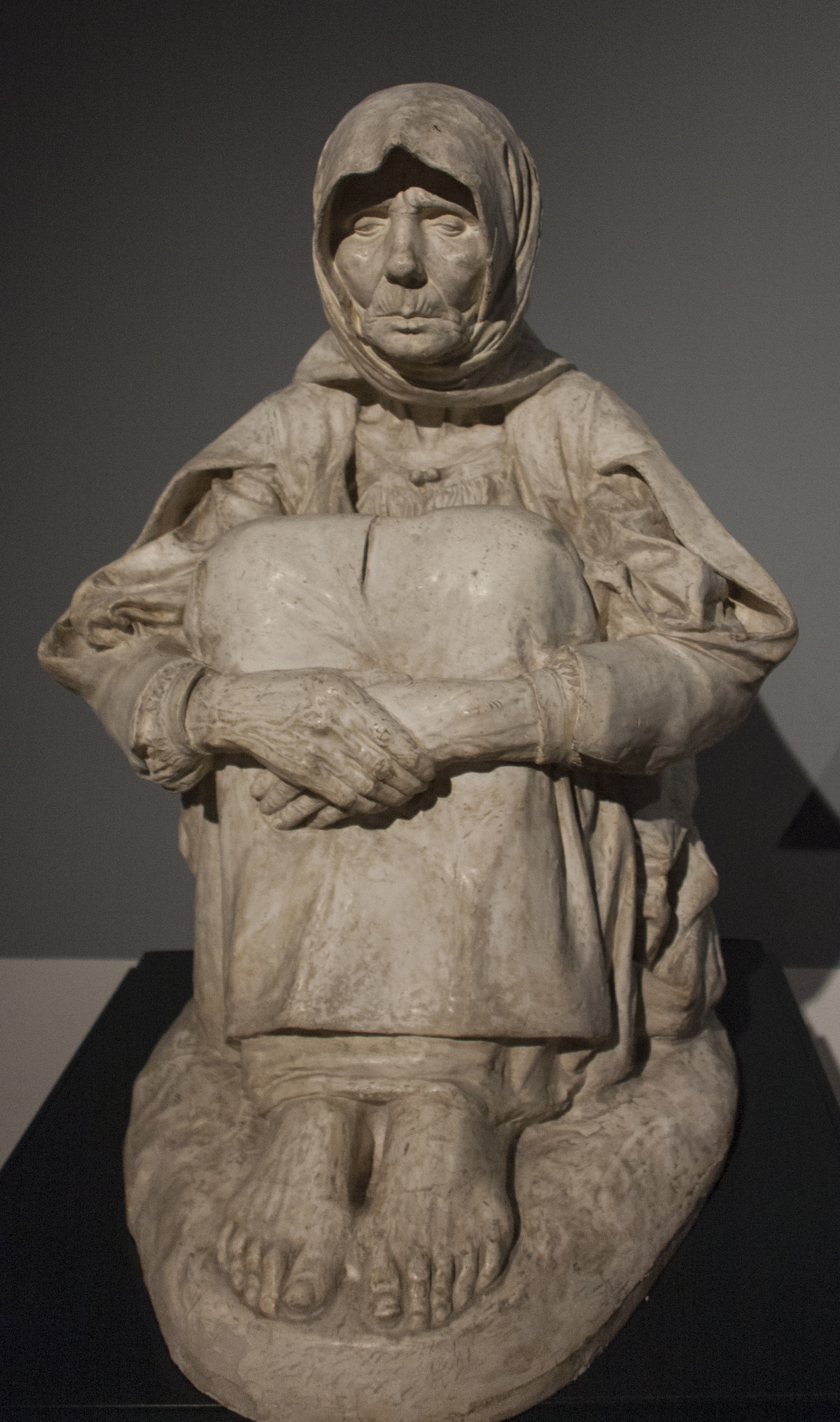
La madre dell'ucciso ("the mother of the killed") by Francesco Ciusa (1907)

In the nineteenth century and in early twentieth century originated the myths of an uncontaminated and timeless island. Recounted by the many travelers who visited Sardinia in that period, like D. H. Lawrence, such myths were celebrated mainly by Sardinian artists such as Giuseppe Biasi, Francesco Ciusa, Filippo Figari, Mario Delitala and Stanis Dessy. In their works they highlighted the autochthonous values of the agro-pastoral world, not yet homologated to the modernity that was pressing from the outside. Other important Sardinian artists of the second half of the twentieth century were Costantino Nivola, Maria Lai, Albino Manca and Pinuccio Sciola.

=== World Heritage Sites ===
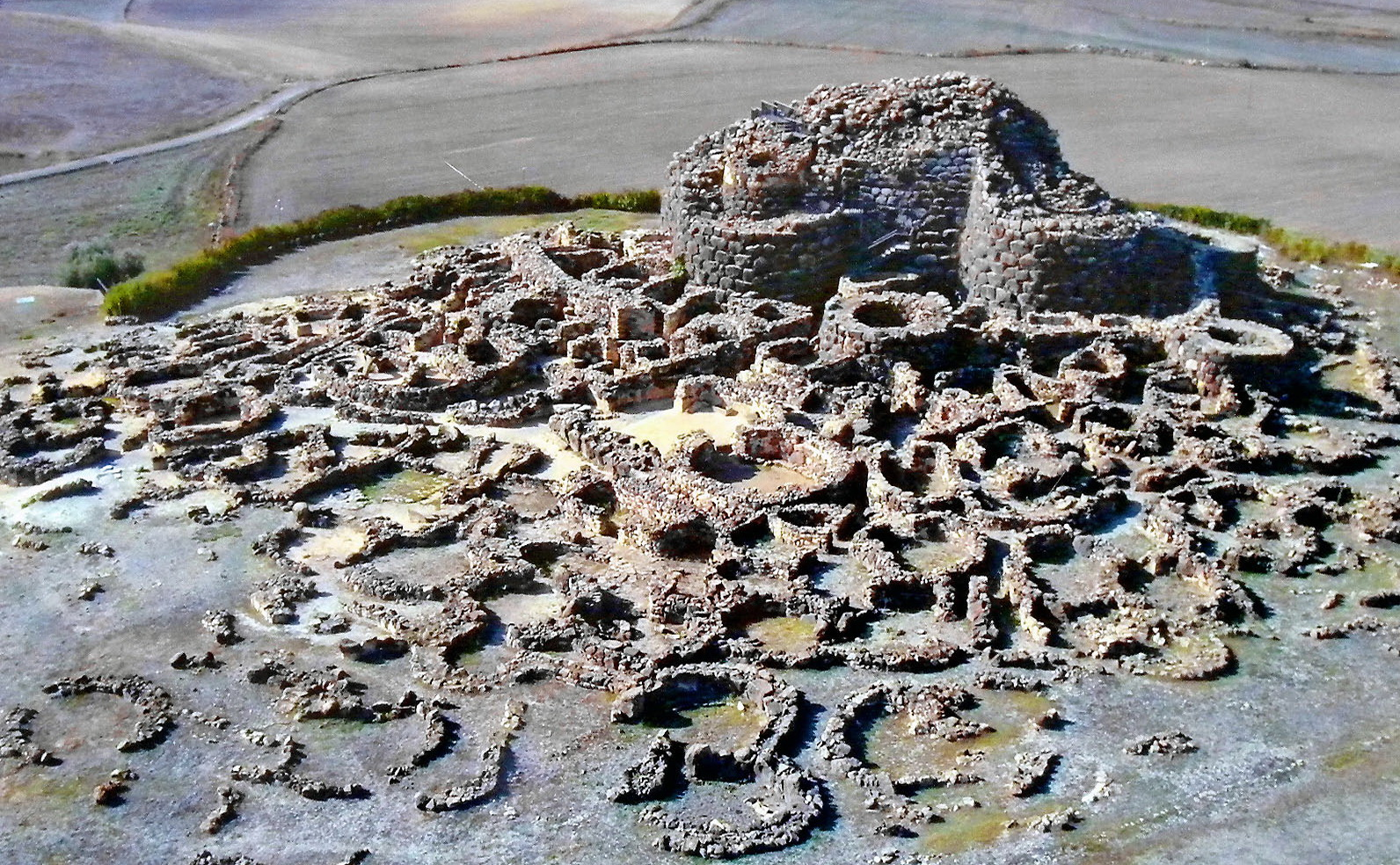
Su Nuraxi, Barumini

Megalithic building structures called nuraghes are scattered in great numbers throughout Sardinia. Su Nuraxi di Barumini is a UNESCO World Heritage Site since 1997.

In July 2025, the domus de janas were inscribed as UNESCO World Heritage Site under the listing "Funerary Tradition in the Prehistory of Sardinia – The domus de janas".

=== Languages ===
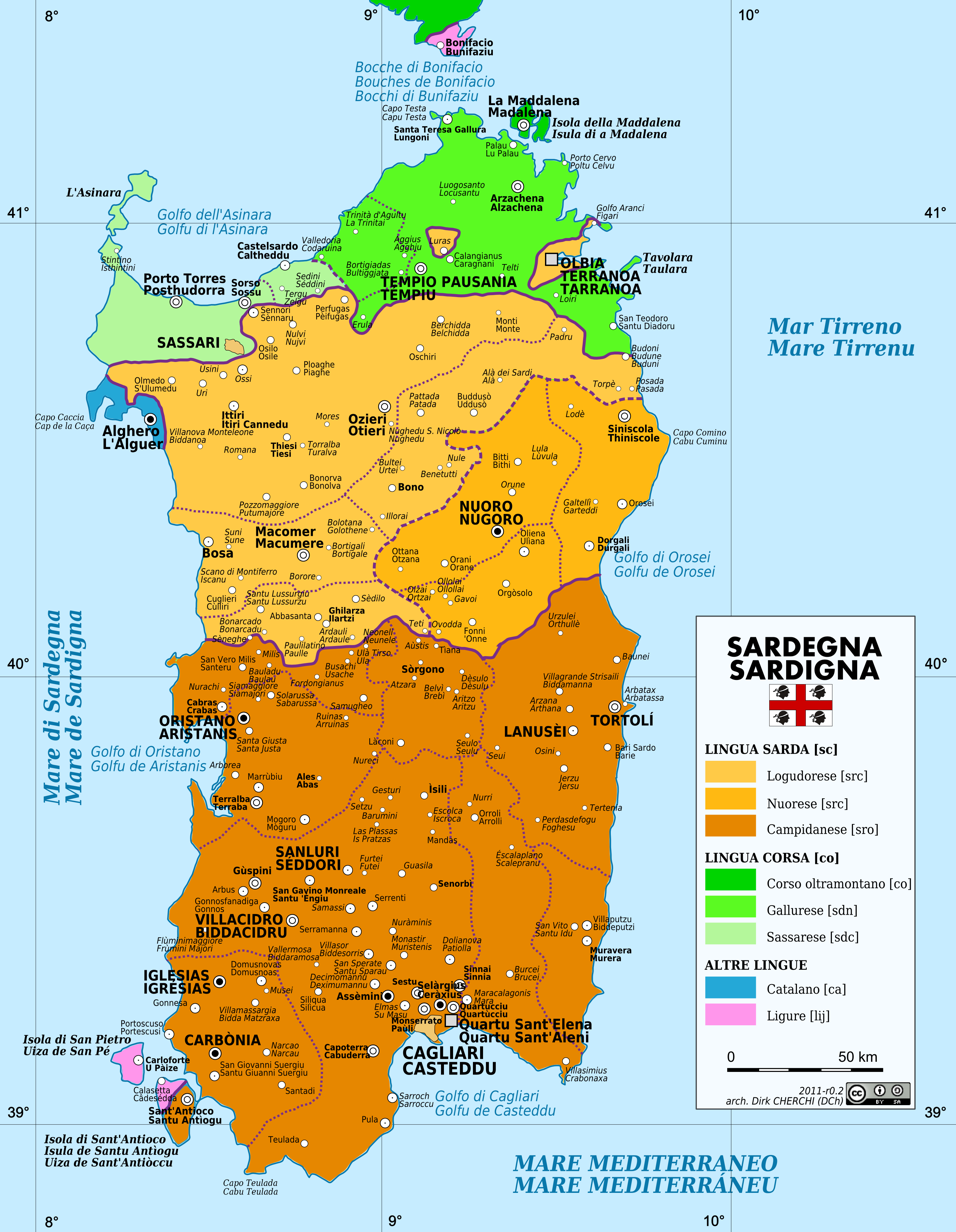
Linguistic map of Sardinia

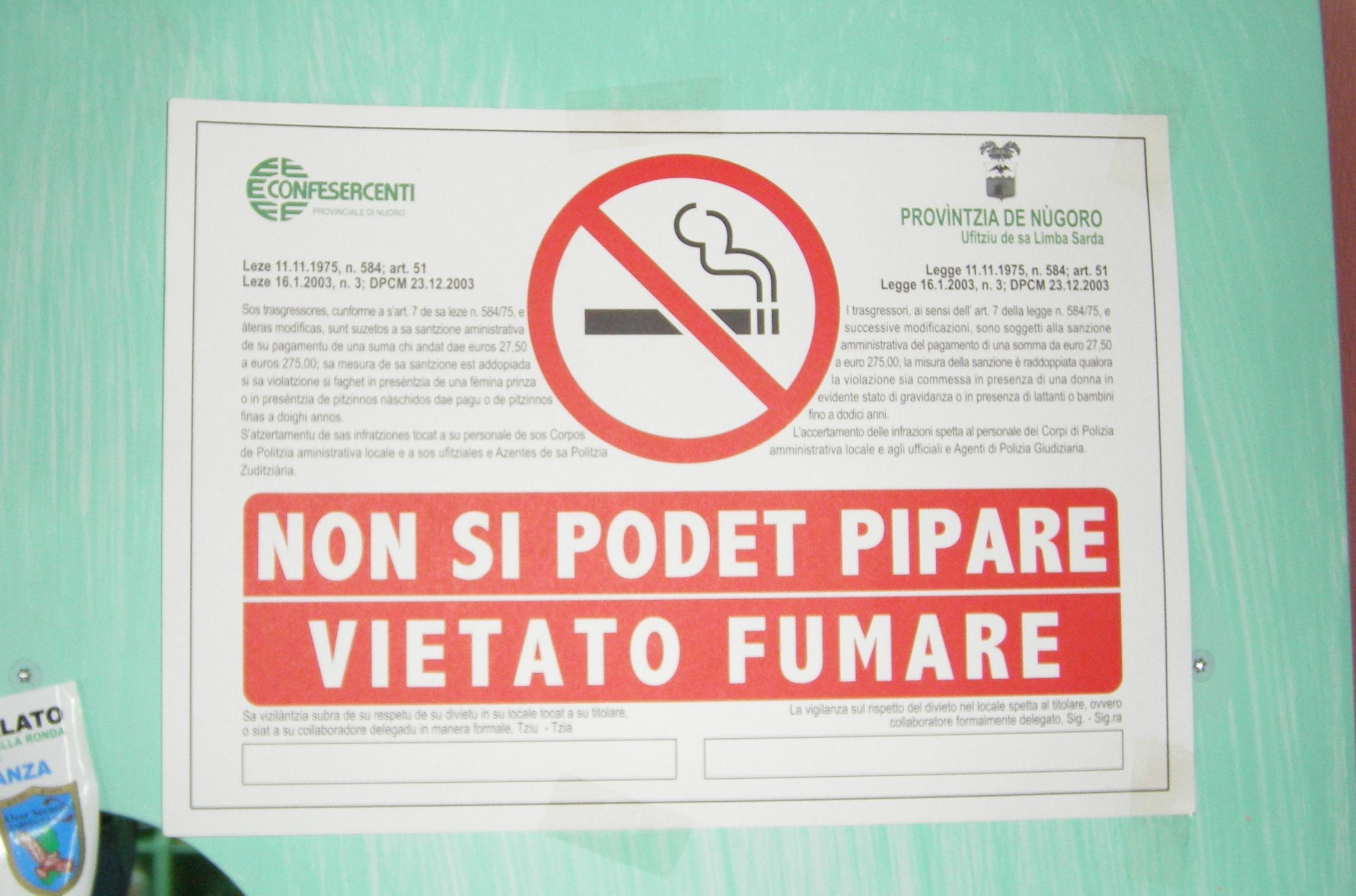
A 'no smoking' sign in both Sardinian and Italian

Italian, which is the official language throughout Italy, is the most widely spoken language today, followed by the island's indigenous language, Sardinian (sardu).

Sardinian is a distinct branch of the Romance language family, going either by the same name or by Southern Romance: it is therefore a separate language rather than an Italian dialect, and it is by some measures more phonologically similar to its Vulgar Latin roots than Italian itself. Sardinian has been formally recognized as one of Italy's twelve historical ethnolinguistic minorities since 1997, by regional and Italian law. The language has been influenced by Catalan, Spanish and recently Italian, while the once spoken Paleo-Sardinian language contributes many features to it in many ancient remnants.

In 2006 the regional administration has approved the use of a single standardised writing system, the so-called Limba Sarda Comuna, in official acts. As a literary language, Sardinian is gaining importance, despite heated debate about the lack of a commonly acknowledged standard orthography and controversial proposed solutions to this problem. The two main orthographies of the language are in fact Campidanese (sardu campidanesu), used in central southern Sardinia, and Logudorese (sardu logudoresu), extending northwards almost to the suburbs of Sassari. The Sardinian language is quite different from the other Romance languages and is homogeneous in terms of morphology, syntax and lexicon, but it also shows a spectrum of variation in terms of phonetics between the Northern and the Southern dialects.

Sassarese (sassaresu) and Gallurese (gadduresu) are classified as Corso-Sardinian languages, therefore belonging to the Italo-Dalmatian branch rather than to the Sardinian one, and are spoken in the north.

In Sardinia there are a few language islands: the Algherese dialect (alguerés) of Catalan is spoken in the city of Alghero; on the islands of San Pietro and Sant'Antioco, located in the extreme south west of Sardinia, the local population speaks a variant of Ligurian called Tabarchino (tabarchin); fewer and fewer people speak Venetian, Friulian and Istriot in Arborea and Fertilia, since these villages have been populated in the 1920s and 1930s by mainland colonists who came from northeast Italy, and families from Istria and Dalmatia immediately after World War II.

Due to the Italian assimilation policies carried out since the late 18th century and the ongoing absorption into the Italian culture, over the course of time the once prevalent indigenous language has been increasingly losing ground to Italian and the process of ongoing language shift has led to its endangerment. In fact, according to the data published by ISTAT in 2006, 52.5% of the Sardinian population speaks only Italian in the family environment, while 29.3% alternates Italian and Sardinian and only 16.6% uses Sardinian or other non-Italian languages; outside the circle of family and friends, the last option drops to 5.2%. The resulting Italianization has led to a steep decline of the Sardinian language as well as produced a new non-standard variety of today's majority idiom, Italian: regional Italian of Sardinia (italiano regionale sardo, IrS).

Following the recent growth of the foreign-born population, the presence of other languages, principally Romanian, Arabic, Wolof and Chinese, is also expanding in some urban areas.

=== Literature ===
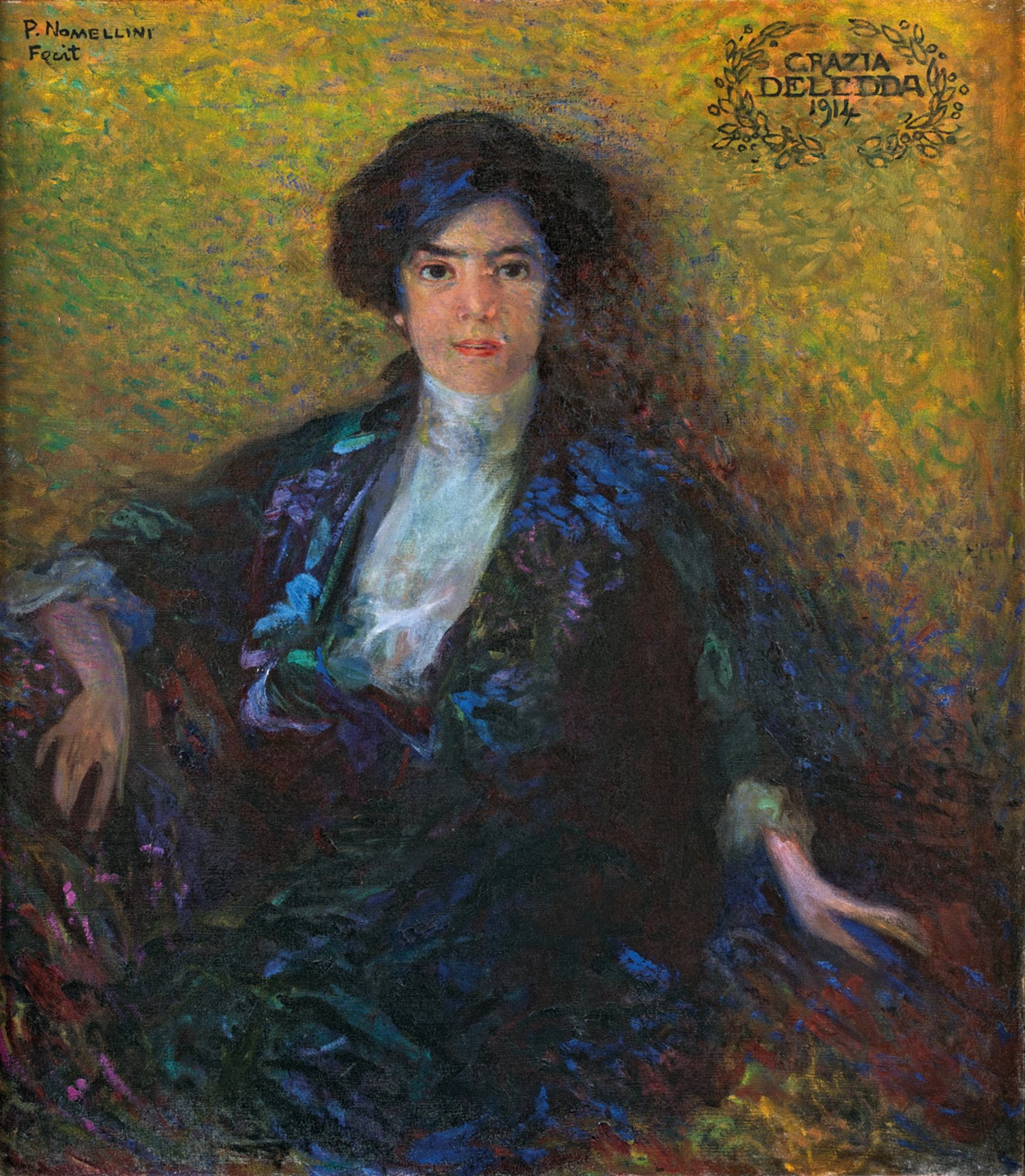
Portrait of Grazia Deledda by Plinio Nomellini, 1914

The first literary work in Sardinian language dates back to the second half of the 15th century: a poem inspired by the life of the holy Porto Torres martyrs by the archbishop of Sassari Antonio Cano. Literary production had a remarkable development in the 16th century, the protagonist was Antonio Lo Frasso, his Los diez libros de Fortuna de Amor is mentioned in the Don Quixote by Miguel de Cervantes. This work is written mainly in Spanish, but there are parts written in Catalan and in the Sardinian language. Multilingualism was a characteristic trait of the islanders of that time, among them Sigismondo Arquer, Giovanni Francesco Fara and Pietro Delitala stood out. Delitala wrote in Italian, then Tuscan, and Gerolamo Araolla in all the three languages (Sardinian, Spanish and Italian). But already in the 17th century there was a total integration in the Iberian world as demonstrated by the works in Spanish of the poets José Delitala y Castelvì, Joseph Zatrillas Vico and the writers Francesco Angelo de Vico and Salvatore Vidal.

From 1720, with the passage of the Kingdom of Sardinia, to the House of Savoy, Italian became the official language. In the 19th century there is an interest of Sardinian authors for the history and culture of Sardinia: Giovanni Spano undertakes the first archaeological excavations, Giuseppe Manno writes the first great general history of the island, Pasquale Tola publishes important documents of the past and writes biographies of illustrious Sardinians. Alberto La Marmora travels the island far and wide, studying in detail and writing a four-part work entitled Voyage en Sardaigne.

The Sardinian society of the Early 20th century is told by Grazia Deledda, the only italian woman to win a Nobel Prize in Literature to date, Enrico Costa, and the poet Sebastiano Satta. In this century, we must remember also the literary production of political characters of great value such as Antonio Gramsci and Emilio Lussu. After the Second World War, Giuseppe Dessì emerged, known mainly for his novel Paese d'ombre. In more recent years, the autobiographical novels of Gavino Ledda Padre Padrone and Salvatore Satta Il Giorno del Giudici had a wide echo, in addition to the works of Sergio Atzeni and other writers active in the recent decades.

=== Traditional clothes ===
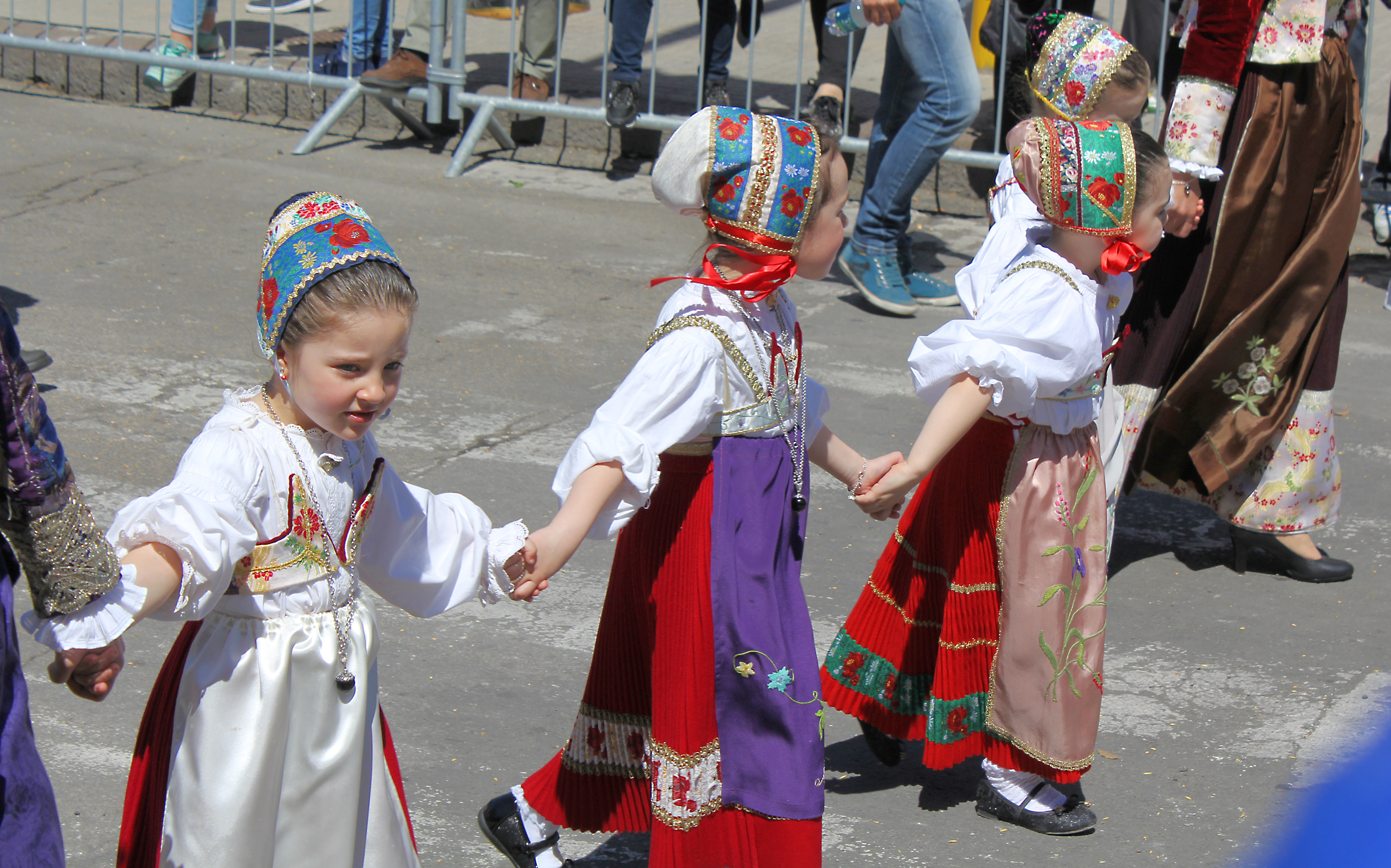
Costume from Ovodda

Colourful and of various and original forms, the Sardinian traditional clothes are a clear symbol of belonging to specific collective identities. Although the basic model is homogeneous and common throughout the island, each town or village has its own traditional clothing which differentiates it from the others.

=== Music ===
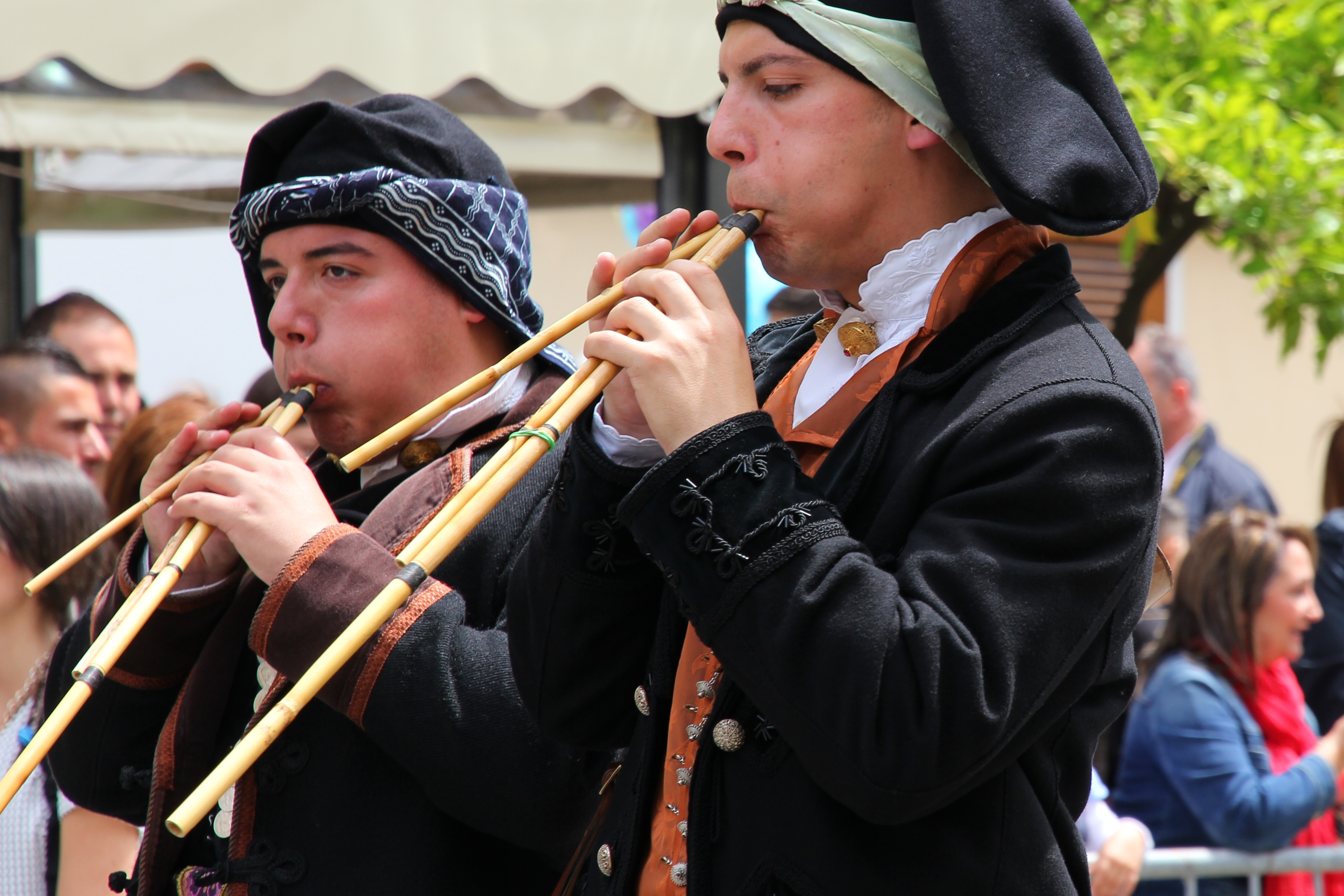
Launeddas players

Sardinia is home to one of the oldest forms of vocal polyphony, generally known as cantu a tenore. In 2005, Unesco classed the cantu a tenore among intangible world heritage. Several famous musicians have found it irresistible, including Frank Zappa, Ornette Coleman, and Peter Gabriel. The latter travelled to the town of Bitti in the central mountainous region and recorded the now world-famous Tenores di Bitti CD on his Real World label. The guttural sounds produced in this form make a remarkable sound, similar to Tuvan throat singing. Another polyphonic style of singing, more like the Corsican paghjella and liturgic in nature, is found in Sardinia and is known as cantu a cuncordu.

Another unique instrument is the launeddas. Three reed-canes (two of them glued together with beeswax) produce distinctive harmonies, which have their roots many thousands of years ago, as demonstrated by the bronze statuettes from Ittiri, of a man playing the three reed canes, dated to 2000 BC.

Beyond this, the tradition of cantu a chiterra (guitar songs) has its origins in town squares, when artists would compete against one another. The most famous singer of this genre are Maria Carta and Elena Ledda.

Sardinian culture is alive and well, and young people are actively involved in their own music and dancing. In 2004, BBC presenter Andy Kershaw travelled to the island with Sardinian music specialist Pablo Farba and interviewed many artists. His programme can be heard on BBC Radio 3. Sardinia has produced a number of notable jazz musicians such as Antonello Salis, Marcello Melis, and Paolo Fresu.

The main opera houses of the island are the Teatro Lirico in Cagliari and the Teatro Comunale in Sassari.

=== Cuisine ===
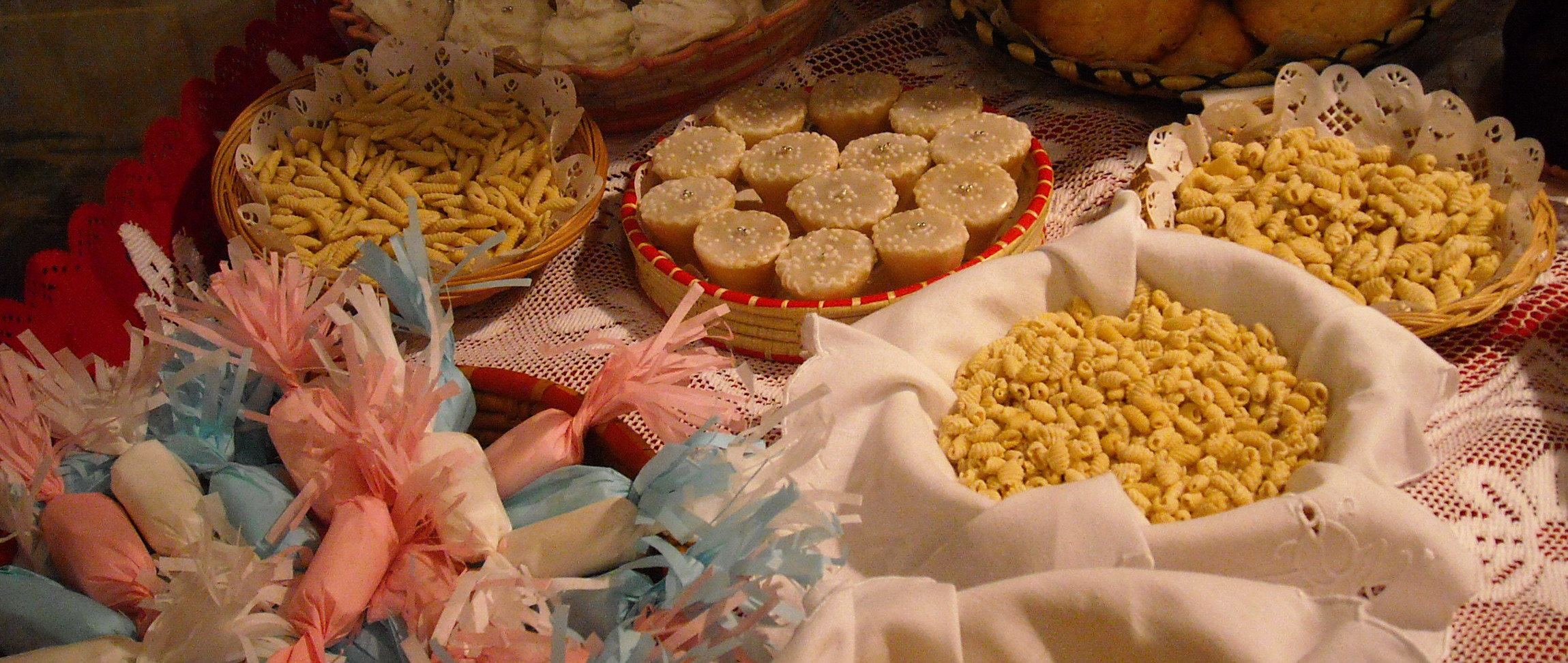
A range of different cakes, pastries, meals, dishes and sweets which are common elements of Sardinian cuisine

Meat, dairy products, grains and vegetables constitute the most basic elements of the traditional Sardinian diet, along with, to a lesser extent, seafoods such as rock lobster (aligusta), scampi, bottarga (butàriga), squid, and tuna.

Suckling pig (porcheddu) and wild boar (sirbone) are roasted on the spit or boiled in stews of beans and vegetables, thickened with bread. Herbs such as mint and myrtle are used. Much Sardinian bread is made dry, which keeps longer than high-moisture breads. Those are baked as well, including civraxiu, coccoi pintau, a highly decorative bread and pistoccu made with flour and water only, originally meant for herders, but often served at home with tomatoes, basil, oregano, garlic and a strong cheese. Traditional cheeses include pecorino sardo, pecorino romano, casizolu, ricotta and the casu martzu (notable for containing live insect larvae).

One of the most famous of foods is pane carasau, the flat bread of Sardinia, famous for its thin crunchiness. Originally the making of this bread was a hard process which needed three women to do the job. This flat bread is always made by hand as it gives a different flavor the more the dough is worked. After working the dough it is rolled out in very thin circles and placed in an extremely hot stone oven where the dough will blow up into a ball shape. Once the dough achieves that state it is then removed from the oven where it is then cut into two thin sheets and stacked to go back into the oven.

Alcoholic beverages include many indigenous wines such as Cannonau, Malvasia, Vernaccia, Vermentino, various liquors like Abbardente, Filu Ferru and Mirto. Beer is the most drunk alcoholic beverage; Sardinia boasts the highest consumption per capita of beer in Italy (twice higher than the national average). Birra Ichnusa is the most commercialized beer produced in Sardinia.

== Sports ==
=== Football ===
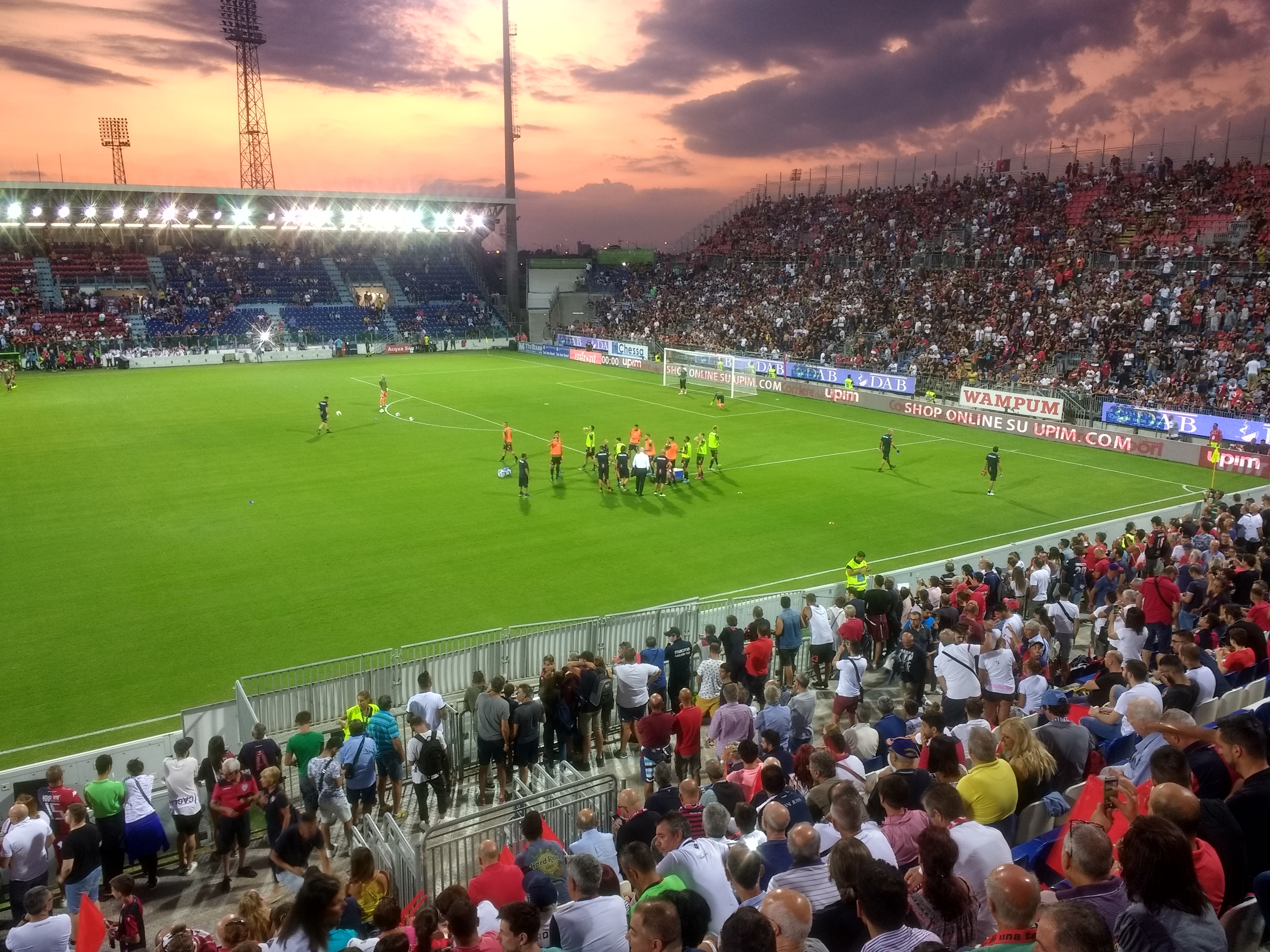
Unipol Domus in Cagliari

Cagliari is home to Cagliari Calcio, which was founded in 1920 and play in Serie A, the Italian first division; it won the Italian Championship in the 1969–70 Serie A season, becoming the first club in Southern Italy to achieve such a result. Today, home matches are played at the Unipol Domus.

The island's other major teams are Olbia's Olbia Calcio and Sassari's Torres Calcio; they both usually play in the national lower leagues. However the latter's women's team counterparts Torres Femminile are 7 times national champions.

The Sardinian national football team has also joined CONIFA, a football federation for all associations outside FIFA.

=== Basketball ===
Sassari is home to Dinamo Basket Sassari, the only Sardinian professional basketball club playing in the Lega Basket Serie A, the highest level club competition in Italian professional basketball. It was founded in 1960, and is also known as Dinamo Banco di Sardegna thanks to a long sponsorship deal with the Sardinian bank. Since its promotion in Lega A in 2010, it has been enjoying the support of fans from Sassari and all over Sardinia with full-house matches on every game played at home. Dinamo Sassari achieved the highest titles in the Italian basketball in 2015, winning the Coppa Italia, the Supercoppa and the Italian basketball championship.

=== Motor racing ===
In the Province of Sassari is the Mores motor racing circuit, the only FIA Circuit homologated by CSAI (Cars) and the IMF (Motorcycles), in Sardinia.

Cagliari hosted a Formula 3000 race in 2002 and 2003 on a 2.414-km street circuit around Sant'Elia stadium. In 2003, Renault F1's Jarno Trulli and former Ferrari driver Jean Alesi did a spectacular exhibition. At the Grand Prix BMW-F1 driver Robert Kubica took part in a F3 car, as did BMW WTCC Augusto Farfus, GP2's Fairuz Fauzy and Vitaly Petrov. Since 2004 Sardinia has hosted the Rally d'Italia Sardegna, a rally competition in the FIA World Rally Championship schedule. The rally is held on narrow, twisty, sandy and bumpy mountainous roads in the north of the island.

=== Water sports ===
Sardinia is well known for scuba diving and snorkeling activities also due to the many underwater caves and caverns located in Alghero and Cala Gonone, Capo Caccia and Punta Giglio limestone cliffs, and many sunken shipwrecks. Around the island there are many diving centers offering scuba diving services with equipment rental and guided tours.

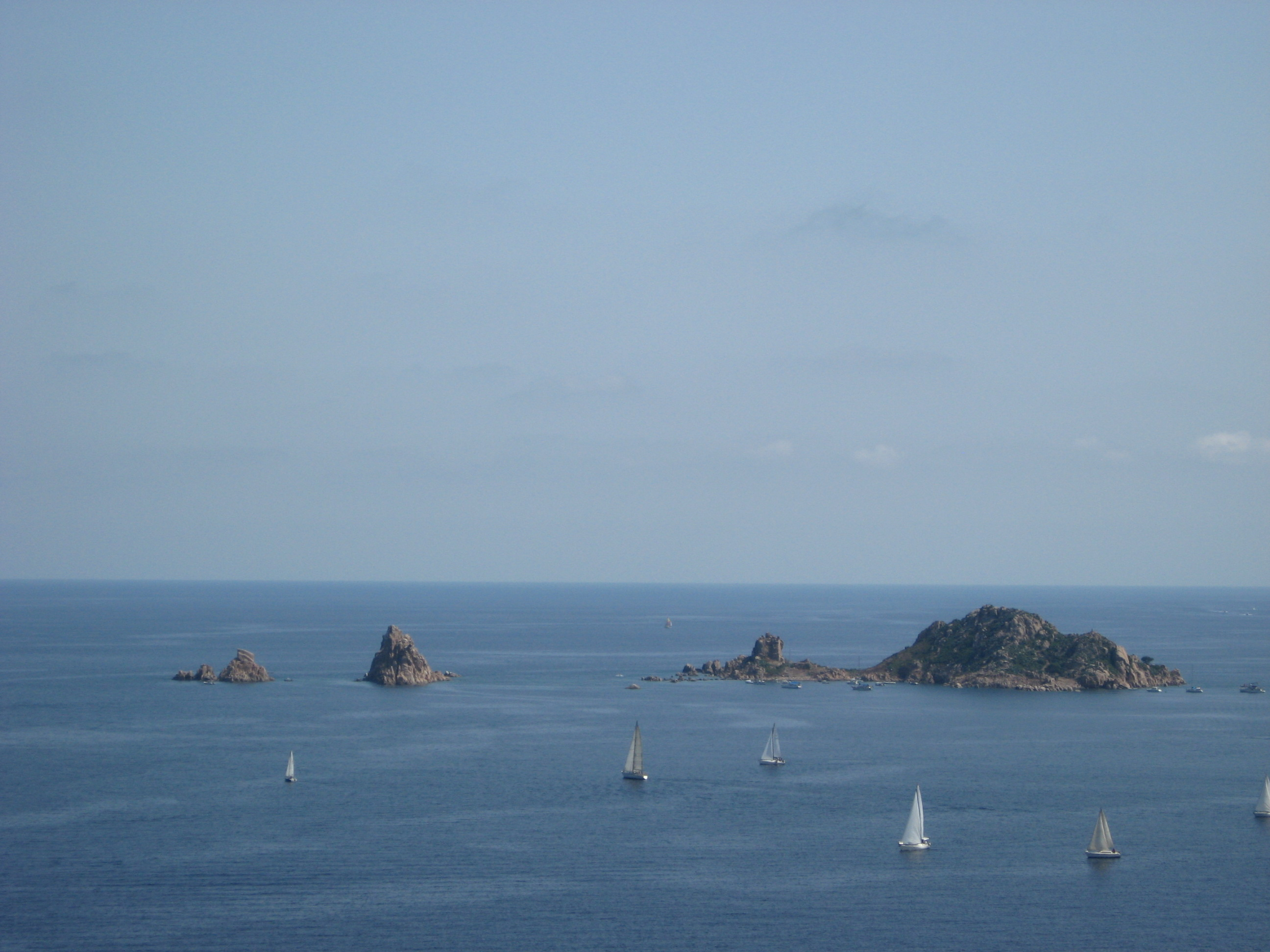
Regatta at Santa Maria Navarrese

On the island of Caprera is the Centro Velico Caprera, considered one of the largest sailing schools in the Mediterranean Sea, founded in 1967.

The Yacht Club Costa Smeralda, located in Porto Cervo and founded in 1967, is the main yachting club on the island.

Annually the island hosts a Superyacht Regatta, previously sponsored by Loro Piana, but from 2021 onwards by Giorgio Armani, and the Maxi Yacht Rolex Cup. Part of the Louis Vuitton Trophy was held in the Maddalena archipelago in 2010.

Vento di Sardegna ('Wind of Sardinia') was a sailboat sponsored by the Autonomous Region of Sardinia. Its skipper, Andrea Mura, won the Single-Handed Trans-Atlantic Race in 2013 and in 2017, the Two Handed Transatlantic Race (Twostar) regatta in 2012 and the Route du Rhum.

Porto Pollo, north of Palau, is a bay well known by windsurfers and kitesurfers. The bay is divided by a thin tongue of land that separates it into areas for advanced and beginner/intermediate windsurfers. There is also a restricted area for kitesurfing. Many freestyle windsurfers went to Porto Pollo for training and 2007 saw the finale of the freestyle Pro Kids Europe 2007 contest. Because of the Venturi effect between Sardinia and Corsica, the western wind accelerates between the islands and creates the wind that makes Porto Pollo popular among windsurfing enthusiasts.

Cagliari hosts regularly international regattas, such as the RC44 championship, Farr 40 World championship, Audi MedCup and Kite Championships. In view of the 36th America's Cup, scheduled to take place in New Zealand in 2021, Luna Rossa Challenge has chosen Cagliari as place for its preparation.

=== Winter sports ===
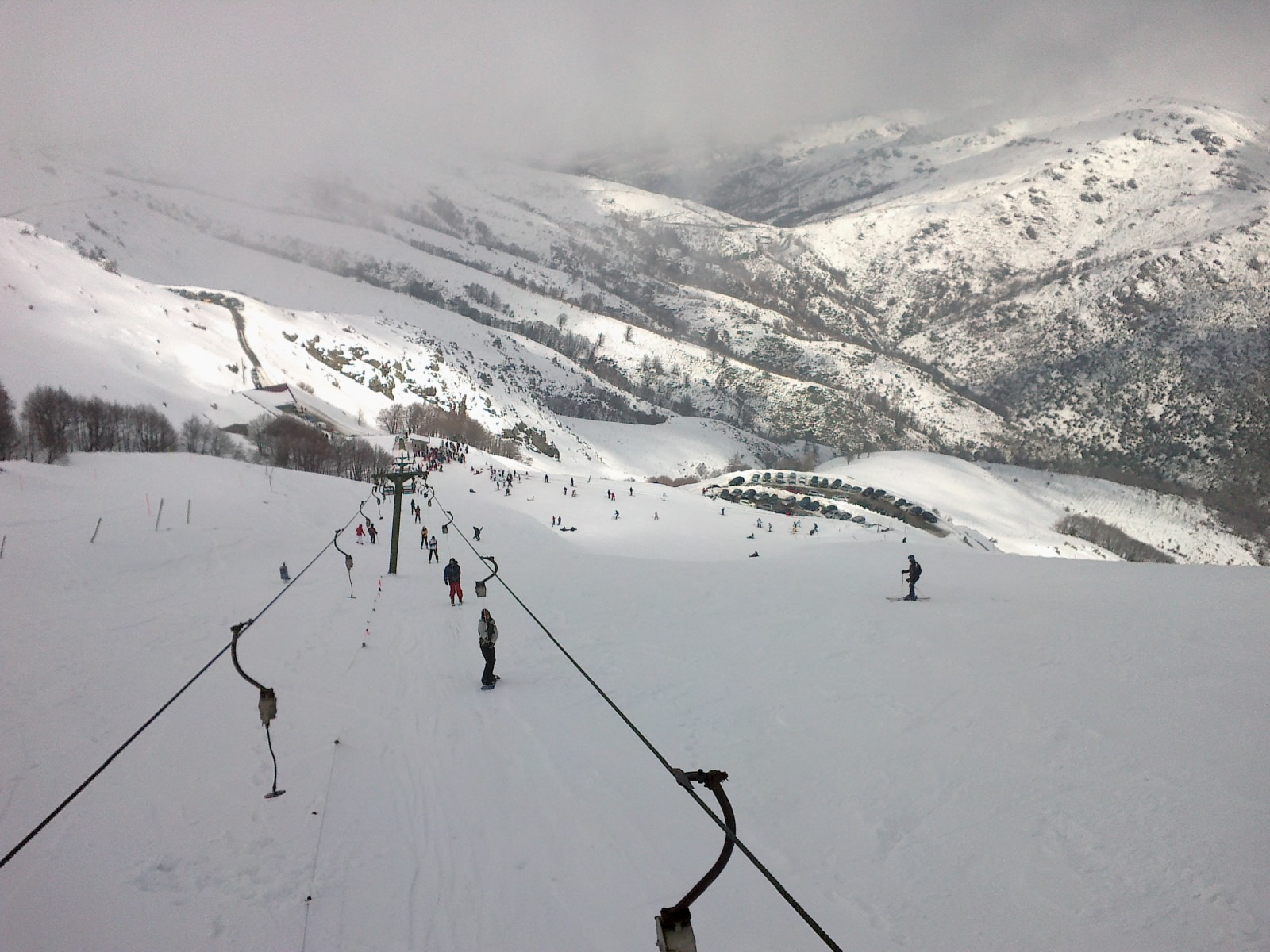
Skilifts on the Bruncu Spina

Four ski resorts are located on the Gennargentu Range at Separadorgiu, Monte Spada, S'Arena and Bruncu Spina; they are equipped with ski schools, chairlifts, skilifts and ski equipment hire.

=== Traditional sports ===
S'Istrumpa, also known as Sardinian Wrestling, is a traditional Sardinian sport, officially recognized by the Italian National Olympic Committee (C.O.N.I.) and the International Federation of Celtic Wrestling (I.F.C.W.). It shows similarities to Scottish Backhold and the gouren. Istrumpa's wrestlers participate annually at the championships for Celtic wrestling stiles.

Sardinia boasts ancient equestrian traditions and is the Italian region with the highest number of horse riders (29% of population) and boasts also fine darts tradition, which many believe originated in the Sassari region of the country towards the end of the 15th century. In those days, the darts were carved from beech (fagus) wood and the flights were feathers drawn from the indigenous purple swamphen (named in Italian pollo sultano, 'sultana bird'), famed for its spectacular violet-blue plumage.

== Economy ==
Economic classification of European regions according to Eurostat Less developed regions Transition regions More developed regions

Of the Italian regions located south of Rome, Sardinia's economy is in the best state. The greatest amount of economic development took place inland, in the provinces of Cagliari and Sassari, characterized by a certain amount of enterprise. According to Eurostat, the 2014 nominal gross domestic product (GDP) was €33,356 million, €33,085 million in purchasing power parity, resulting in a GDP per capita of €19,900, which is 72% of the EU average. The per capita income in Sardinia is the highest of the southern half of Italy. The most populated provincial chief towns have higher incomes: in Cagliari the income per capita is €27,545, in Sassari €24,006, in Oristano €23,887, in Nuoro is €23,316 and in Olbia is €20,827. Sardinia is the 14th most productive region in the country and is the 16th for GRP per capita among Italian regions.

The Sardinian economy is, however, constrained due to the high costs of the transportation of goods and electricity, which is twice that of the continental Italian regions, and triple that of the EU average. Sardinia is the only Italian region that produces a surplus of electricity, and exports electricity to Corsica and the Italian mainland: in 2009, the new submarine power cable Sapei entered into operation. It links the Fiume Santo Power Station, in Sardinia, to the converter stations in Latina, in the Italian peninsula. The SACOI is another submarine power cable that links Sardinia to Italy, crossing Corsica, from 1965.

Small scale liquified natural gas terminals and a 404 km (251 mi) gas pipeline were under construction, and became operational in 2018. They will decrease the current high cost of the electric power in the island. As of 2021, Sardinia has 2 GigaWatts (GW) of thermal power plants, 1 GW each of wind and solar power, and over 450 MW of hydropower.

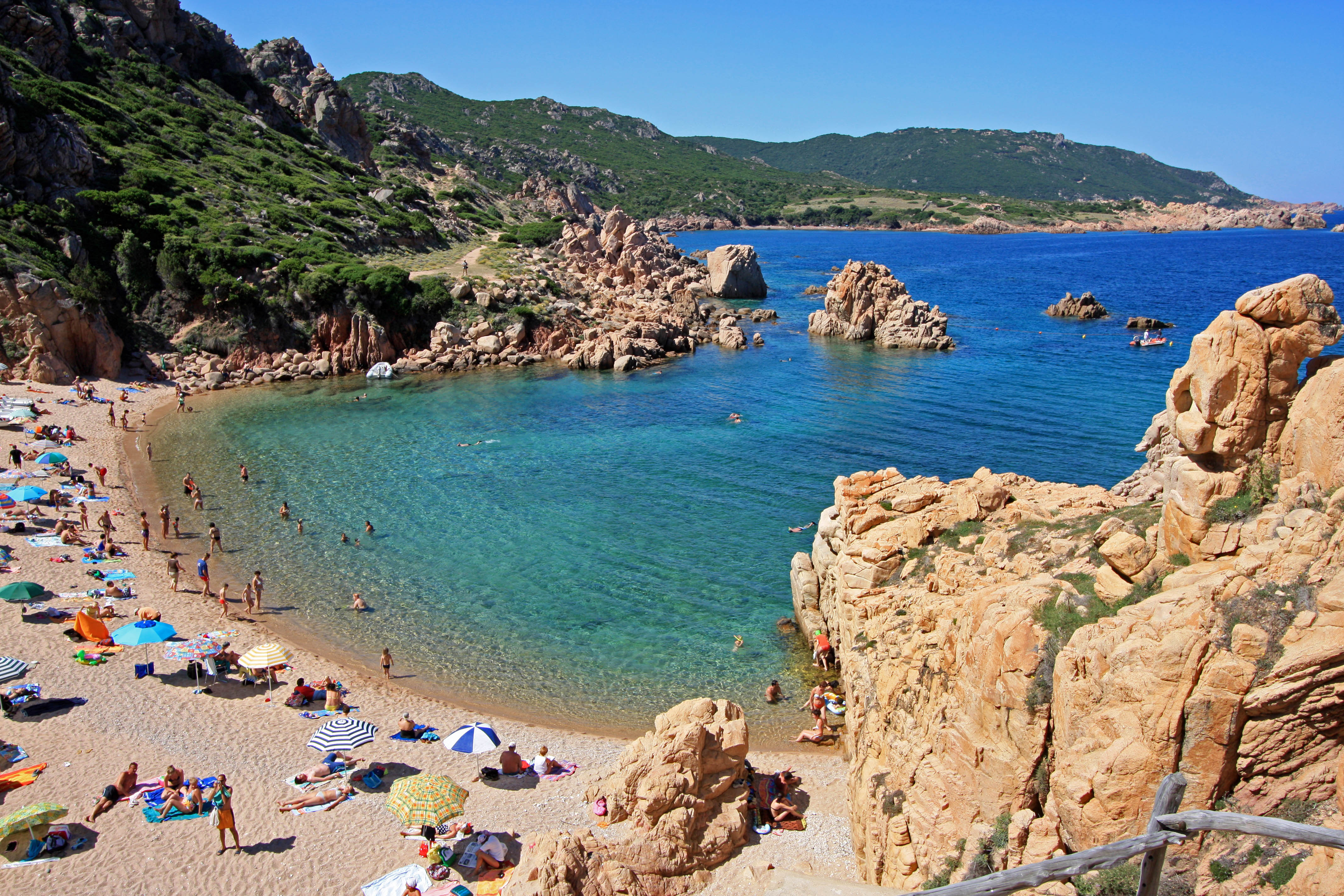
Tourism in Sardinia is one of the fastest growing sectors of the regional economy.

Three main banks are headquartered in Sardinia; however, Banco di Sardegna and Banca di Sassari, are both originally from Sassari.

There are chances for Sardinia to become a tax haven as the whole island territory is free of custom duties, value added tax (VAT) and excise taxes on fuel; since February 2013, the town of Portoscuso has become the first free trade zone. According to the article 12 of the Sardinian Statute modified by the regional parliament in October 2013: "The Territory of the Autonomous Region of Sardinia is located off the customs line and constitutes a Free Trade Zone enclosed by the surrounding sea; the access points consist of the seaports and the airports. The Sardinian Free Trade Zone is regulated by the laws of the European Union and Italy that are in force also in Livigno, Campione D'Italia, Gorizia, Savogna d'Isonzo and the Region of Aosta Valley".

	2000	2001	2002	2003	2004	2005	2006	2007
Gross domestic product nominal (Million €)	25,958.1	27,547.6	28,151.6	29,487.3	30,595.5	31,421.3	32,579.0	33,823.2
GDP per capita nominal (Euro)	15,861.0	16,871.4	17,226.5	17,975.7	18,581.0	19,009.8	19,654.3	20,444.1

=== Unemployment ===
The unemployment rate for the fourth quarter of 2008 was 8.6%; by 2012, the unemployment rate had increased to 14.6%. Its rise was due to the Great Recession that reduced Sardinian exports, mainly focused on refined oil, chemical products, and also mining and metallurgical products.

The unemployment rate dropped to 11.2% at the end of 2018, which is only 1.8 percentage points (pp) higher than the national average (9.4%) and 5.3pp lower than Southern Italian regions (16.5%), according to Italian National Institute of Statistics.

=== Economic sectors ===
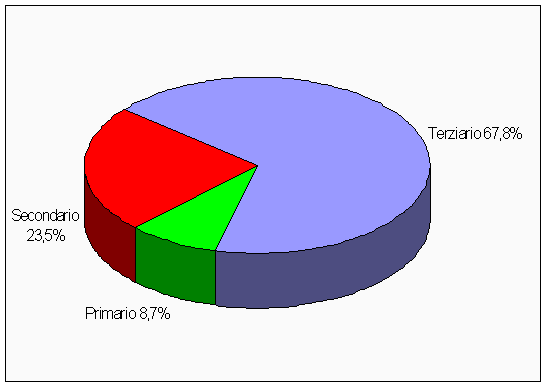
Percentage distribution of employees in different economic sectors in Sardinia: 8.7% the primary sector (fishing, agriculture, farming), 23.5% the secondary sector (industry, machinery, manufacturing), and 67.8% the tertiary sector (tourism, services, finance)

This table shows the sectors of the Sardinian economy in 2011:

Economic activity	GDP (mil. €)	% sector
Agriculture, farming, fishing	908	3%
Industry	2,828	9.4%
Constructions	1,722	5.7%
Commerce, hotels and restaurants, transport, services and (tele)communications	7,597	25.4%
Financial activity and real estate	8,011	26.7%
Other economic activities related to services	8,896	29.7%
Total value added	29,962	100%
GDP of Sardinia	33,638	

==== Primary ====
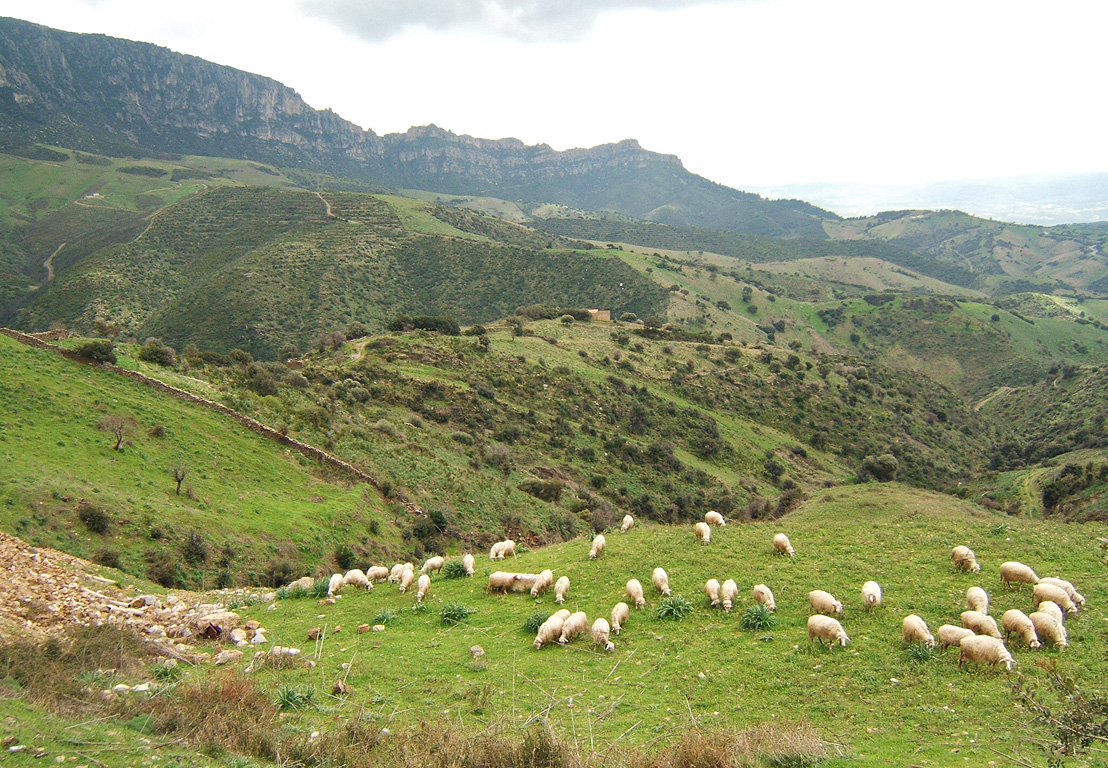
Sheep grazing around Lula, Nuoro

Sardinia is home to nearly four million sheep, almost half of the entire Italian assets and that makes the island one of the areas of the world with the highest density of sheep along with some parts of the United Kingdom and New Zealand (135 sheep every square kilometer versus 129 in UK and 116 in New Zealand). Sardinia has been for thousands of years specializing in sheep breeding, and, to a lesser extent, goats and cattle that is less productive of agriculture in relation to land use. It is probably in breeding and cattle ownership the economic base of the early proto-historic and monumental Sardinian civilization from Neolithic to the Iron Age.

Agriculture has also played a very important role in the economic history of the island, especially in the great plain of Campidano, particularly suitable for wheat farming. Sardinian soil often has insufficient or brackish water aquifers, even on its more permeable plains. As such, water scarcity was the first problem that was faced for the modernization of the sector, with the construction of a great barrier system of dams, which today contains nearly 2 billion cubic meters of water. The Sardinian agriculture is now linked to specific products such as cheese, wine, olive oil, artichoke, tomato for a growing product export. The reclamations have helped to extend the crops and to introduce other ones such as vegetables and fruit, next to the historical ones, olive and grapes that are present in the hilly areas. The Campidano plain, the largest lowland Sardinian produces oats, barley and durum, of which is one of the most important Italian producers. Among the vegetables, as well as artichokes, has a certain weight the production of oranges, and, before the reform of the sugar sector from the European Union, the cultivation of sugar beet.

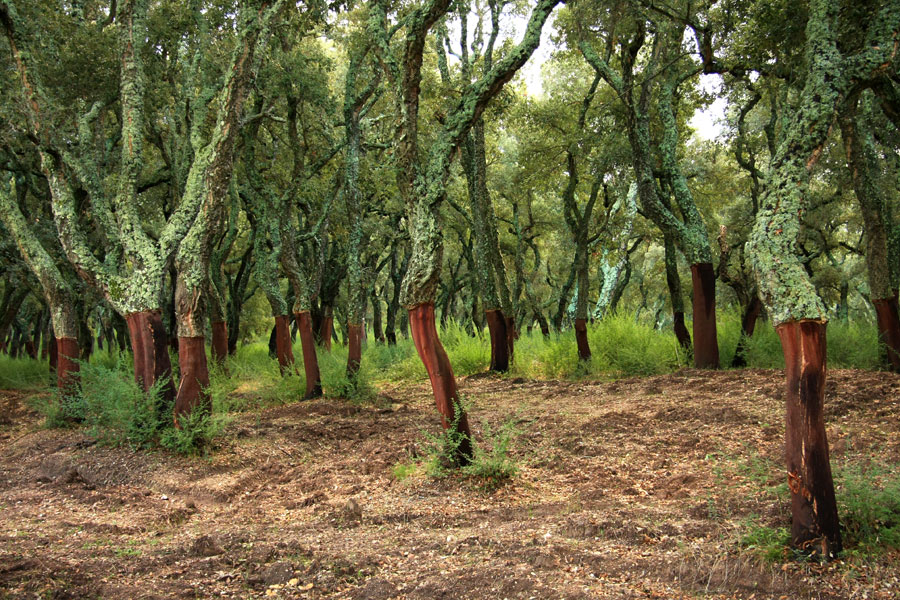
Peeled trunks of cork oaks in Tempio Pausania

In the forests there is the cork oak, which grows naturally; Sardinia produces about 80% of Italian cork. The cork district, in the northern part of the Gallura region, around Calangianus and Tempio Pausania, is composed of 130 companies. Every year in Sardinia 200,000 quintals (20,000 tonnes) of cork are carved, and 40% of the end products are exported.

In fresh food, as well as artichokes, the production of tomatoes (including Camoni tomato) and citrus fruit are of a certain weight. Sardinia is the 5th Italian region for rice production, the main paddy fields are located in the Arborea Plain.

In addition to meat, Sardinia produces a wide variety of cheese, considering that half of the sheep milk produced in Italy is produced in Sardinia, and is largely worked by the cooperatives of the shepherds and small industries. Sardinia also produces most of the pecorino romano, a non-original product of the island, much of which is traditionally addressed to the Italian overseas communities. Sardinia boasts a centuries-old tradition of horse breeding since the Aragonese domination, whose cavalry drew from equine heritage of the island to strengthen their own army or to make a gift to the other sovereigns of Europe. Today the island boasts the highest number of horse herds in Italy.

There is little fishing (and no real maritime tradition), Portoscuso tunas are exported worldwide, but primarily to Japan.

==== Industry and handicraft ====
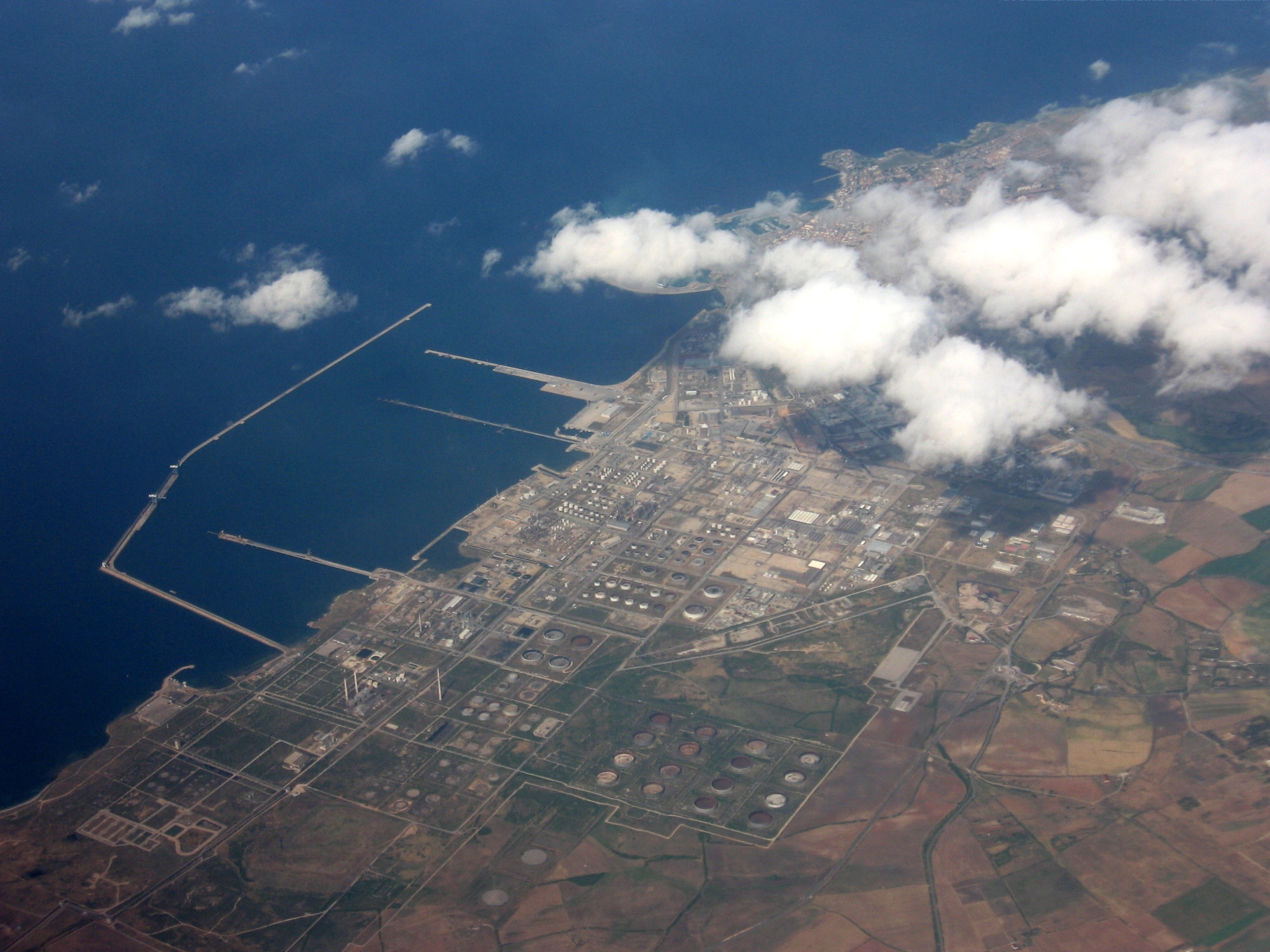
Petrochemical and Green Chemical industries in Porto Torres

The once prosperous mining industry is still active though restricted to coal (Nuraxi Figus, hamlet of Gonnesa), antimony (Villasalto), gold (Furtei), bauxite (Olmedo) and lead and zinc (Iglesiente, Nurra). The granite extraction represents one of the most flourishing industries in the northern part of the island. The Gallura granite district is composed of 260 companies that work in 60 quarries, where 75% of the Italian granite is extracted. The principal industries are chemicals (Porto Torres, Cagliari, Villacidro, Ottana), petrochemicals (Porto Torres, Sarroch), metalworking (Portoscuso, Portovesme, Villacidro), cement (Cagliari), pharmaceutical (Sassari), shipbuilding (Arbatax, Olbia, Porto Torres), oil rig construction (Arbatax), rail industry (Villacidro), arms industries at Domusnovas and food (sugar refineries at Villasor and Oristano, dairy at Arborea, Macomer and Thiesi, fish factory at Olbia).

In Sardinia is located the DASS (Distretto Aerospaziale della Sardegna), a consortium of companies, research centers and universities focused on aerospace industry and research. The aerospace manufacturer Vitrociset, in Villaputzu, is involved in the production of the stealth multirole fighter Lockheed Martin F-35 Lightning II.

Plans related to industrial conversion are in progress in the main industrial sites, like in Porto Torres, where seven research centres are developing the transformation from traditional fossil fuel related industry to an integrated production chain from vegetable oil using oleaginous seeds to bio-plastics.

Sardinia is involved in the industrial production of the AIRPod, an innovative car powered by compressed air, with the first factory being built in Bolotana.

Craft industries include rugs, jewelry, textile, lacework, basket making and coral.

==== Tertiary ====
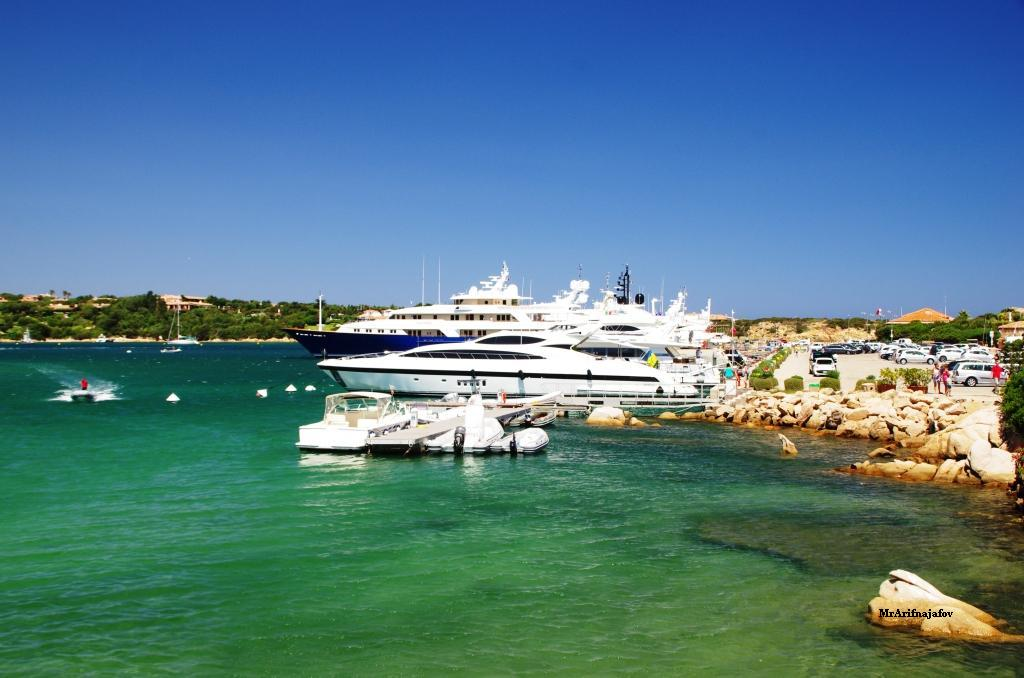
Yachts in Porto Cervo. Luxury tourism has been an important source of income in Sardinia since the 1960s.

The Sardinian economy is today focused on the tertiary sector (67.8% of employment), with commerce, services, information technology, public administration and especially on tourism (mainly seaside tourism), which represents the main industry of the island with 2,721 active companies and 189,239 rooms. In 2008 there were 2,363,496 arrivals (up 1.4% on 2007). In the same year, the airports of the island registered 11,896,674 passengers (up 1.24% on 2007).

Due to its isolated and insular location, Sardinia focused part of its economy on the development of digital technologies since the dawn of internet era: the first Italian website, one of the first webmail system and one of the first and largest internet providers (Video On Line) were realised by the CRS4, the first European online newspaper was developed by L'Unione Sarda and also the first Italian UMTS company was founded on the island. Today Sardinia is the second Italian region, after Lombardy, for investments in startups (owning the 20% of the Italian venture capital).

Sardinia has many small and picturesque villages, nine of them have been selected by I Borghi più belli d'Italia (English: The most beautiful Villages of Italy), a non-profit private association of small Italian towns of strong historical and artistic interest, that was founded on the initiative of the Tourism Council of the National Association of Italian Municipalities.

== Education ==
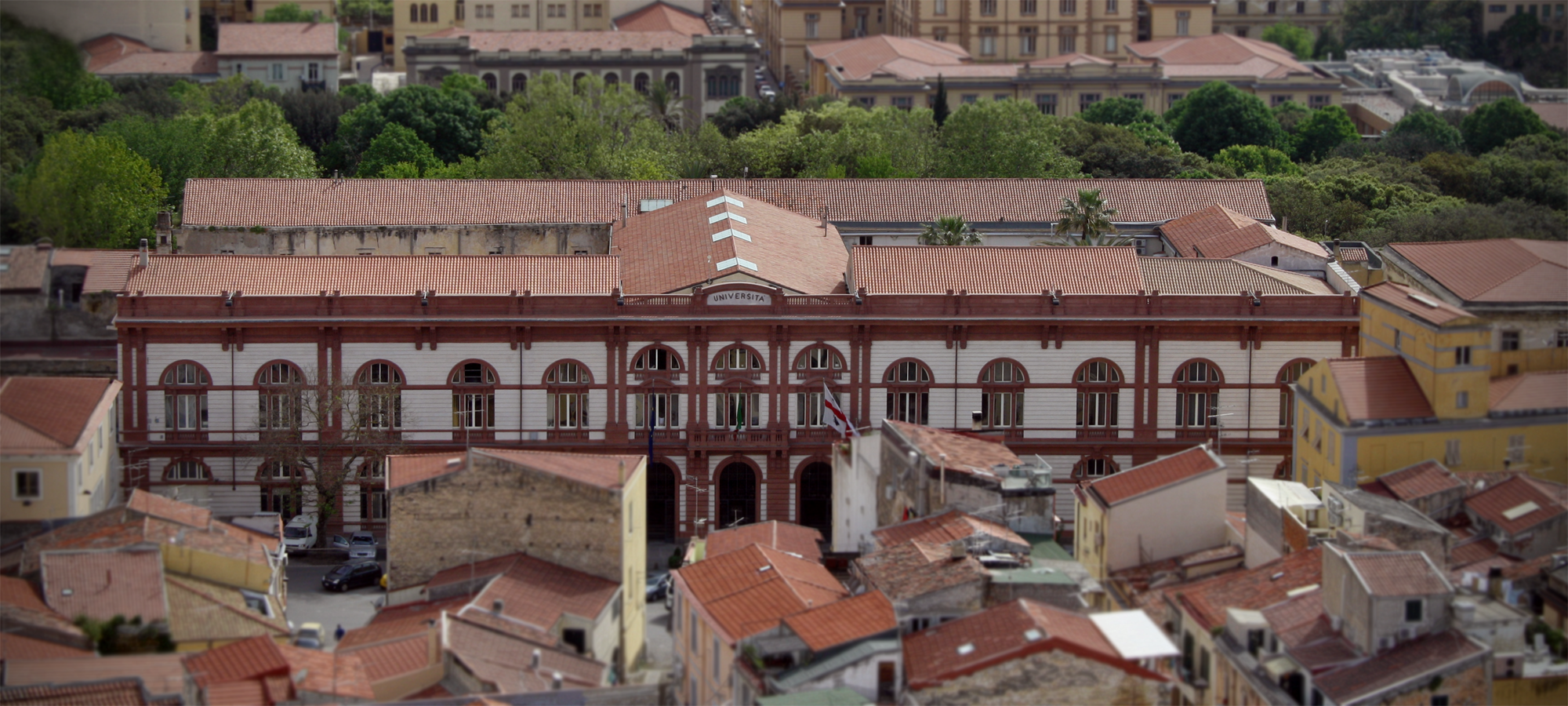
Main building of the University of Sassari (which started the university courses in 1562)

According to the ISTAT census of 2001, the literacy rate in Sardinia among people below 65 years old is 99.5 percent. Total literacy rate (including people over 65) is 98.2 percent. The illiteracy rate among males below 65 years old is 0.24 percent and among women 0.25 percent; the number of women that annually graduate at secondary high schools and universities is about 10–20 percent higher than men. Sardinia has the 2nd highest rate of school drop-out in Italy.

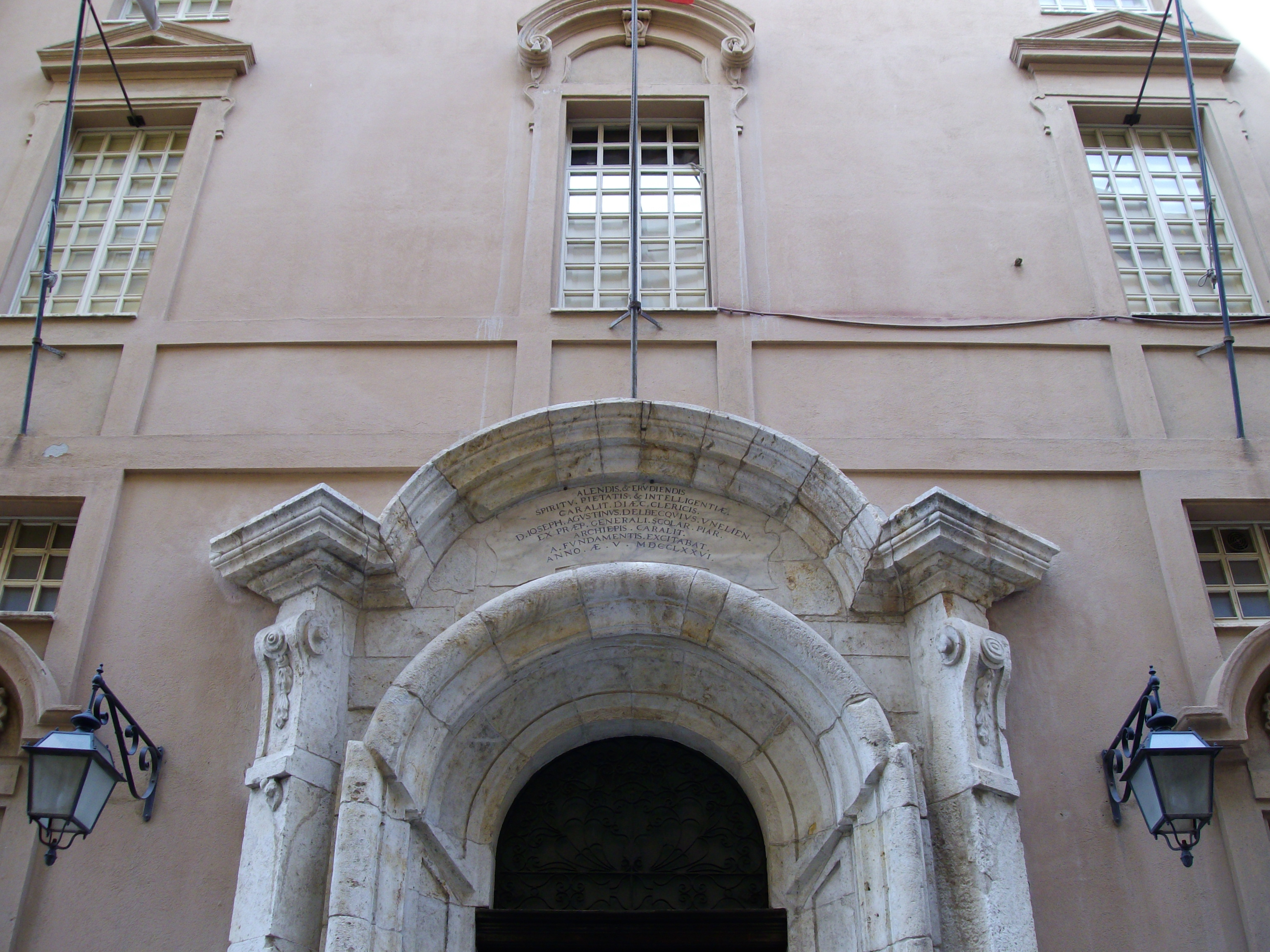
Portal of the Main Building of the University of Cagliari

Sardinia has two public universities: the University of Sassari and the University of Cagliari, founded in the 16th and 17th century. 48,979 students were enrolled at universities in 2007–2008.

Cagliari is also home to the Pontifical Faculty of Theology of Sardinia and the Istituto Europeo di Design.

== Communications ==
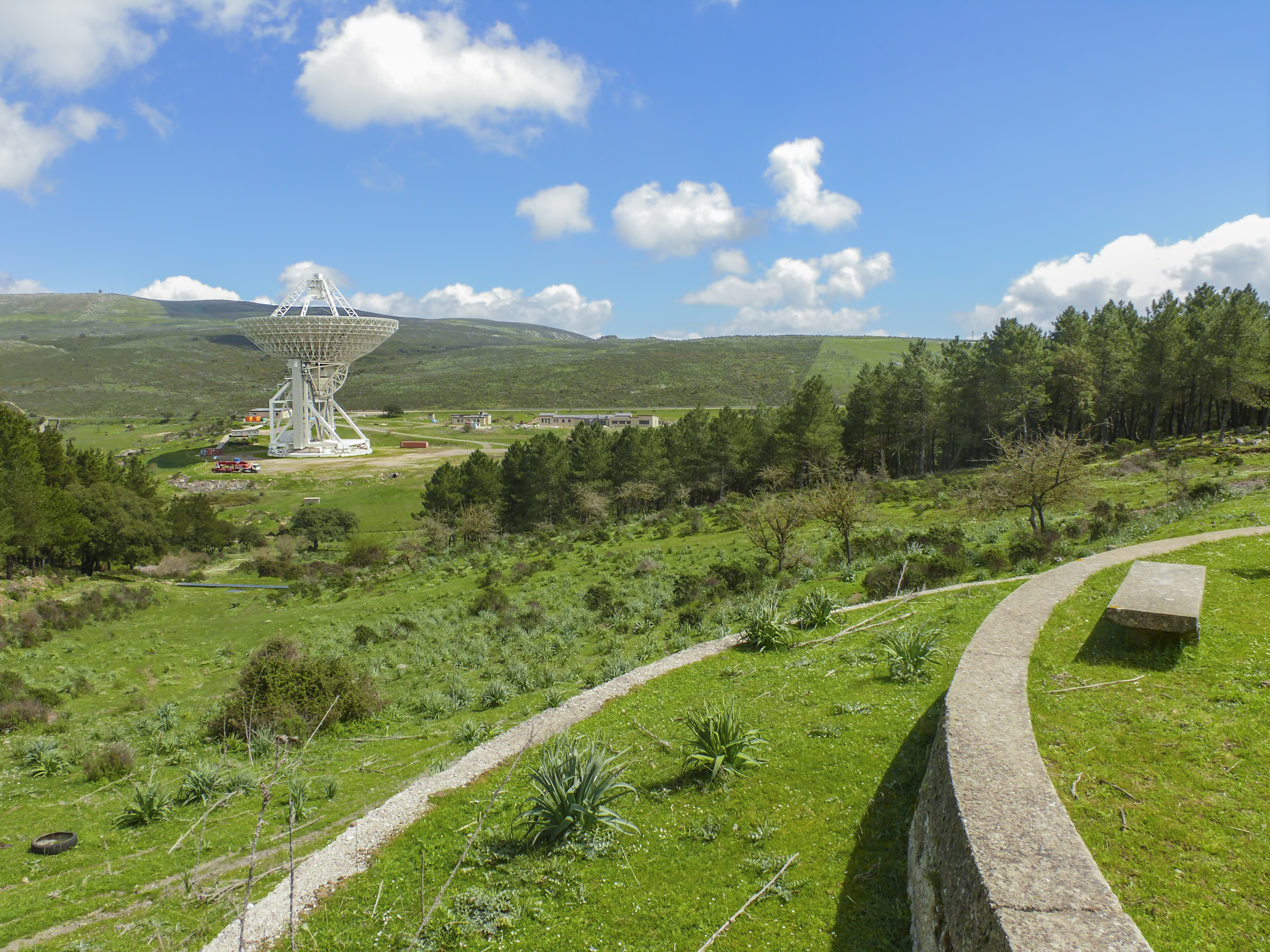
Sardinia Radio Telescope

On the island are headquartered some telecommunication companies and internet service providers, such as Tiscali and the Mediterranean Skylogic Teleport, a ground station controlled by satellite provider Eutelsat. Sardinia is the Italian region with the highest e-intensity index after the Aosta Valley (index measuring the relative maturity of Internet economies on the basis of three factors: enablement, engagement, and expenditure) and the region with the highest internet performances, such as fastest broadband connection in Italy. Sardinia is also the Italian region with the highest percentage (41%) of 4G LTE users. The Chinese multinational telecommunications equipment and systems companies ZTE and Huawei have development centers and innovation labs in Sardinia.

Sardinia has become Europe's first region to fully adopt the new Digital Terrestrial Television broadcasting standard. From 1 November 2008 TV channels are broadcast only in digital.

== Transport ==
=== Airports ===
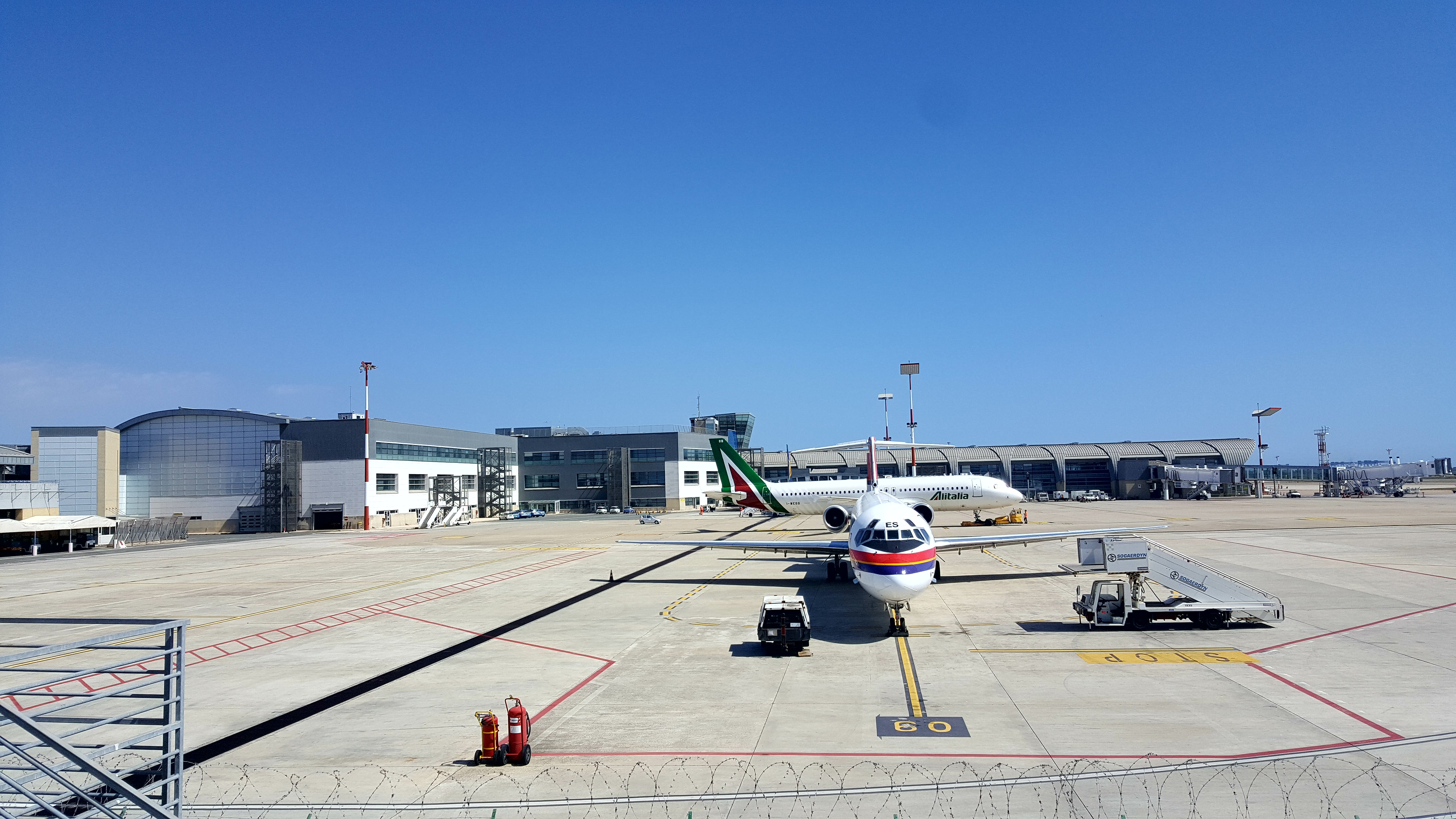
Cagliari-Elmas Airport. The 12th busiest airport in Italy in 2025

Sardinia has three international airports (Alghero-Fertilia/Riviera del Corallo Airport, Olbia-Costa Smeralda Airport and Cagliari-Elmas Airport) connected with the principal Italian cities and many European destinations, mainly in the United Kingdom, France, Spain and Germany, and two regional airports (Oristano-Fenosu Airport and Tortolì-Arbatax Airport). Internal air connections between Sardinian airports are limited to a daily Cagliari-Olbia flight. Sardinian citizens benefit from special sales on plane tickets for Rome and Milan (continuità territoriale), and several low-cost air companies operate on the island.

Airone - Compagnia Trasporti Aerei S.A. was an airline established in Cagliari in October 1944, its founders intended it to be the answer to the need for fast connections between Sardinia and mainland Italy. The name itself recalled one of the most typical animals of the island's wetlands. It is remembered as the first airline founded in Italy after the Second World War.

Air Italy (formerly known as Meridiana) was an airline headquartered in the airport of Olbia; it was founded as Alisarda in 1963 by the Aga Khan IV. The development of Alisarda followed the development of Costa Smeralda in the northeast part of the island, a well known vacation spot among billionaires and film actors worldwide.

=== Seaports ===
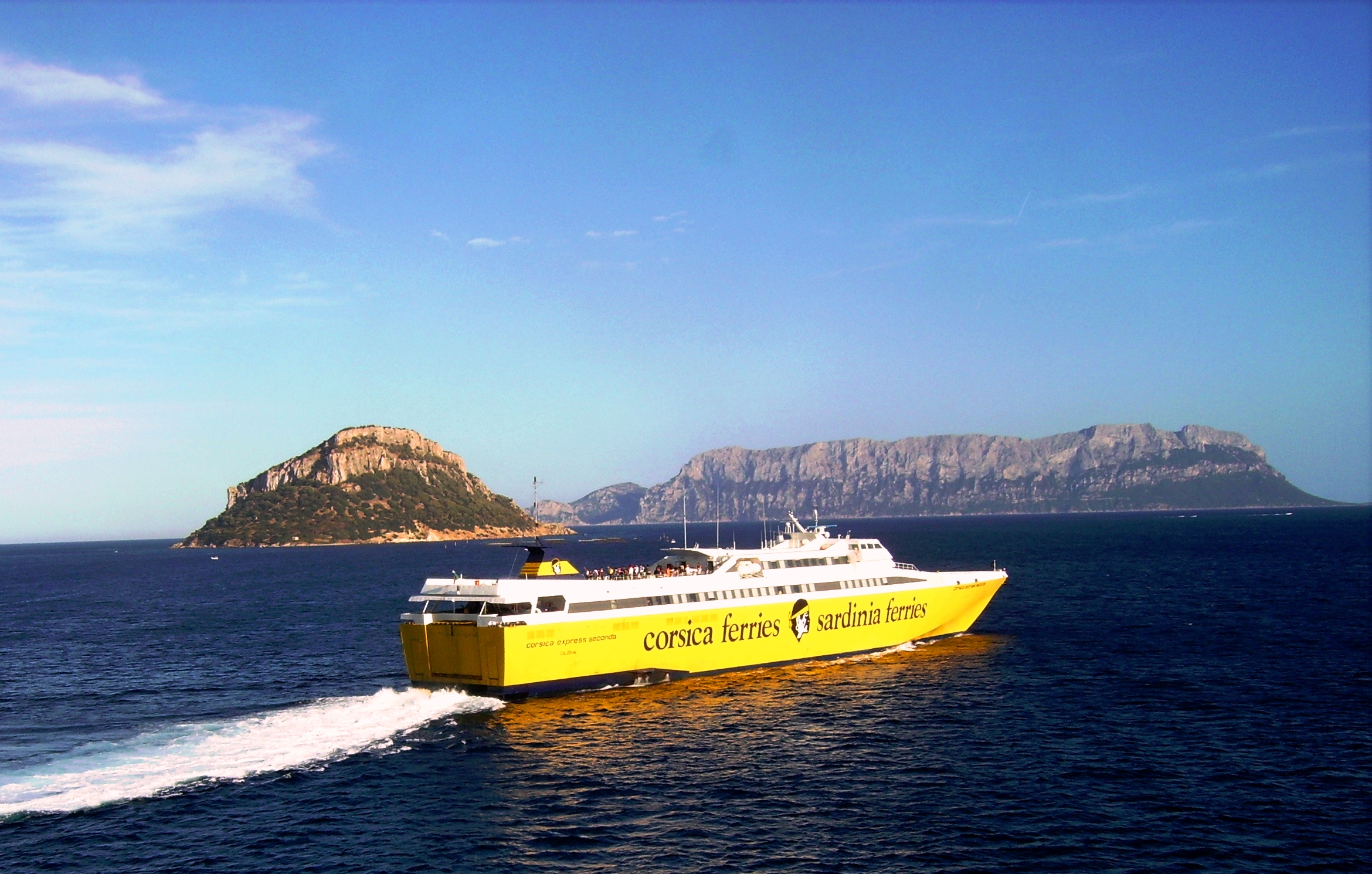
A high-speed ferry in the Gulf of Olbia

The ferry companies operating on the island are Tirrenia di Navigazione, Moby Lines, Corsica Ferries - Sardinia Ferries, Grandi Navi Veloci, Grimaldi Lines, Corsica Linea; they link the Sardinian seaports of Porto Torres, Olbia, Golfo Aranci, Arbatax, Santa Teresa Gallura and Cagliari with Civitavecchia, Genoa, Livorno, Naples, Palermo, Trapani, Piombino in Italy, Marseille, Toulon, Bonifacio, Propriano and Ajaccio in France and Barcelona in Spain.

Porto Torres is the largest port of Sardinia, while Olbia, Santa Teresa Gallura and Palau are the most popular arrival ports, based on passenger data between 2020–2024. Sardinia is connected by regular ferry services to mainland Italy and several neighbouring islands, with routes operating from ports such as Genoa, Livorno and Civitavecchia.

Caronte & Tourist and Delcomar links the main island to the islands of La Maddalena and San Pietro.

About 40 tourist harbours are located along the Sardinian coasts.

=== Roads ===
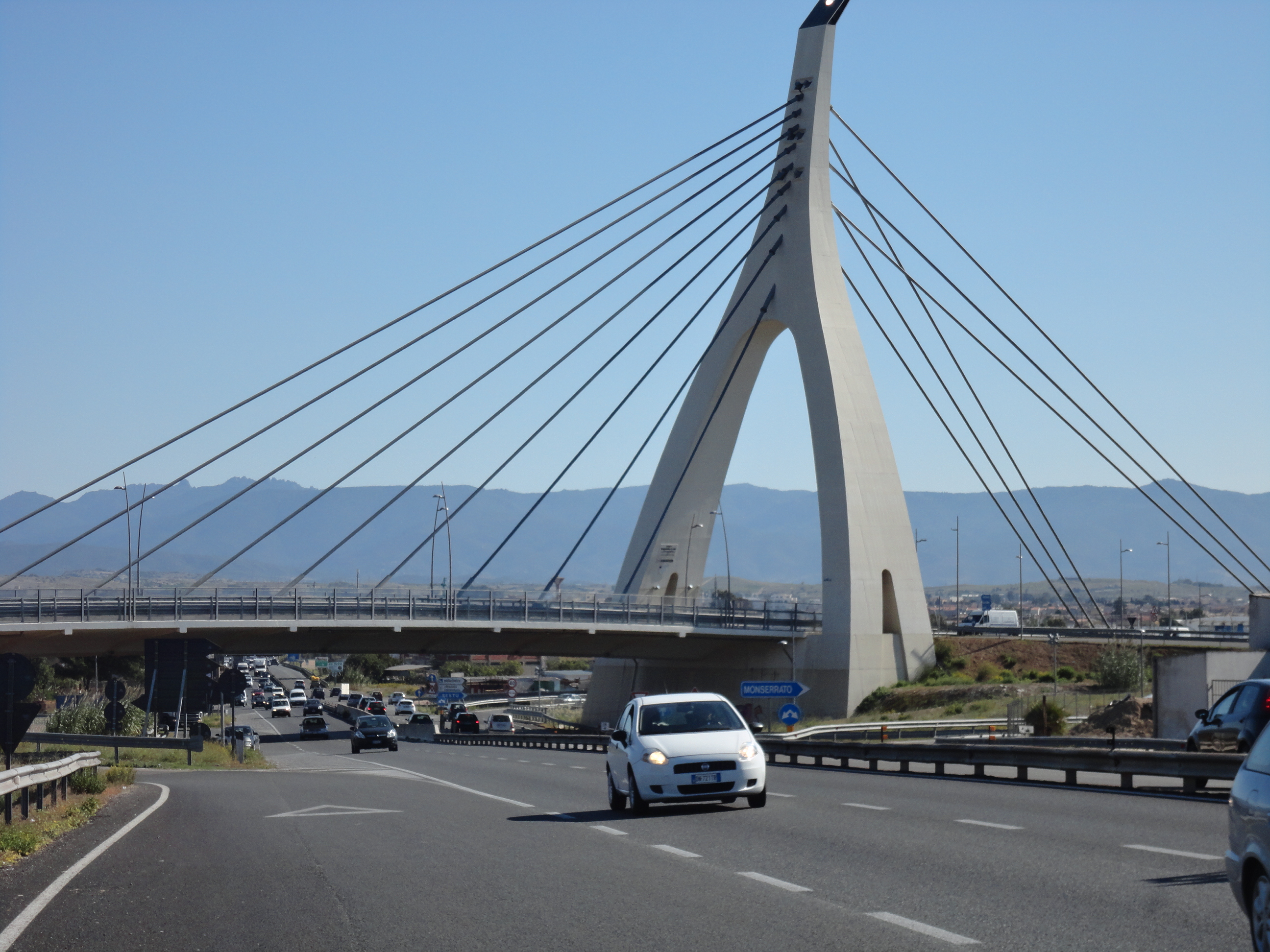
Cable-stayed bridge of the Monserrato University Campus interchange SS 554

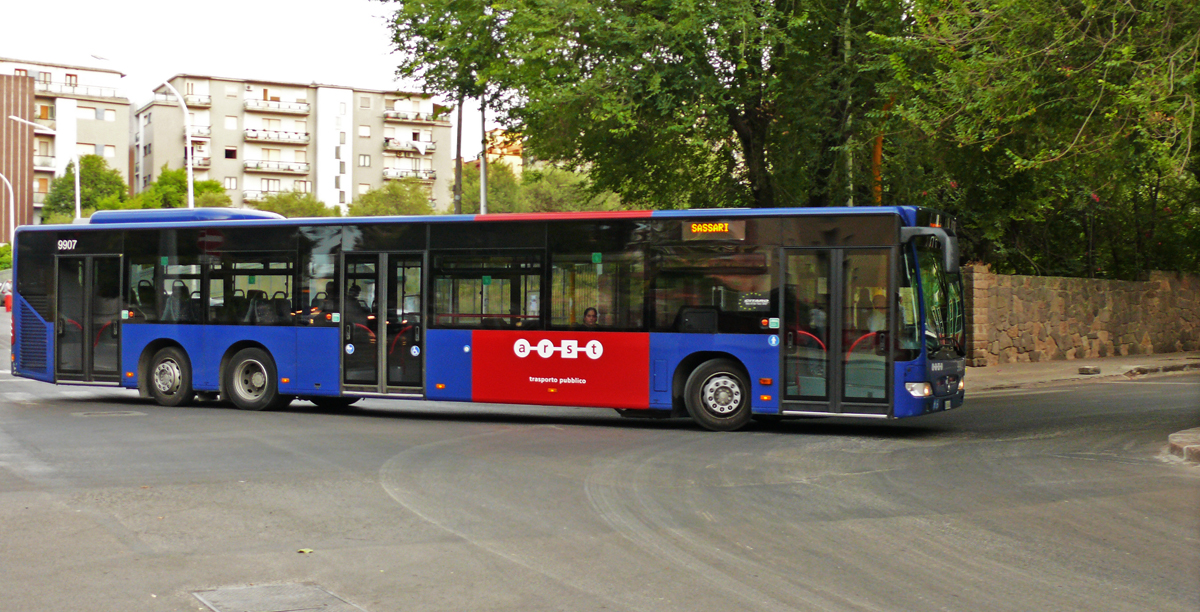
A bus of Sardinia public transport authorities (Arst) in Sassari

Sardinia is the only Italian region without Autostrade (en:motorways), but the road network is well developed with a system of no-toll roads with dual carriageway, called superstrade ('super roads') that connect the principal towns and the main airports and seaports; the speed limit is 90 km/h (56 mph)/110 km/h (68 mph). The principal road is the SS131 "Carlo Felice", linking the south with the north of the island, crossing the most historic regions of Porto Torres and Cagliari; it is part of European route E25. The SS 131 d.c.n links Oristano with Olbia, crossing the hinterland Nuoro region. Other roads designed for high-capacity traffic link Sassari with Alghero, Sassari with Tempio Pausania, Sassari – Olbia, Cagliari – Tortolì, Cagliari – Iglesias, Nuoro – Lanusei. A work in progress is converting the main routes to highway standards, with the elimination of all intersections. The secondary inland and mountain roads are generally narrow with many hairpin turns, so the speed limits are very low.

Public transport buses reach every town and village at least once a day; however, due to the low density of population, the smallest territories are reachable only by car. The Azienda Regionale Sarda Trasporti (ARST) is the public regional bus transport agency. Networks of city buses serve the main towns (Cagliari, Iglesias, Oristano, Alghero, Sassari, Nuoro, Carbonia and Olbia).

In Sardinia 1,295,462 vehicles circulate, equal to 613 per 1,000 inhabitants.

=== Railways ===
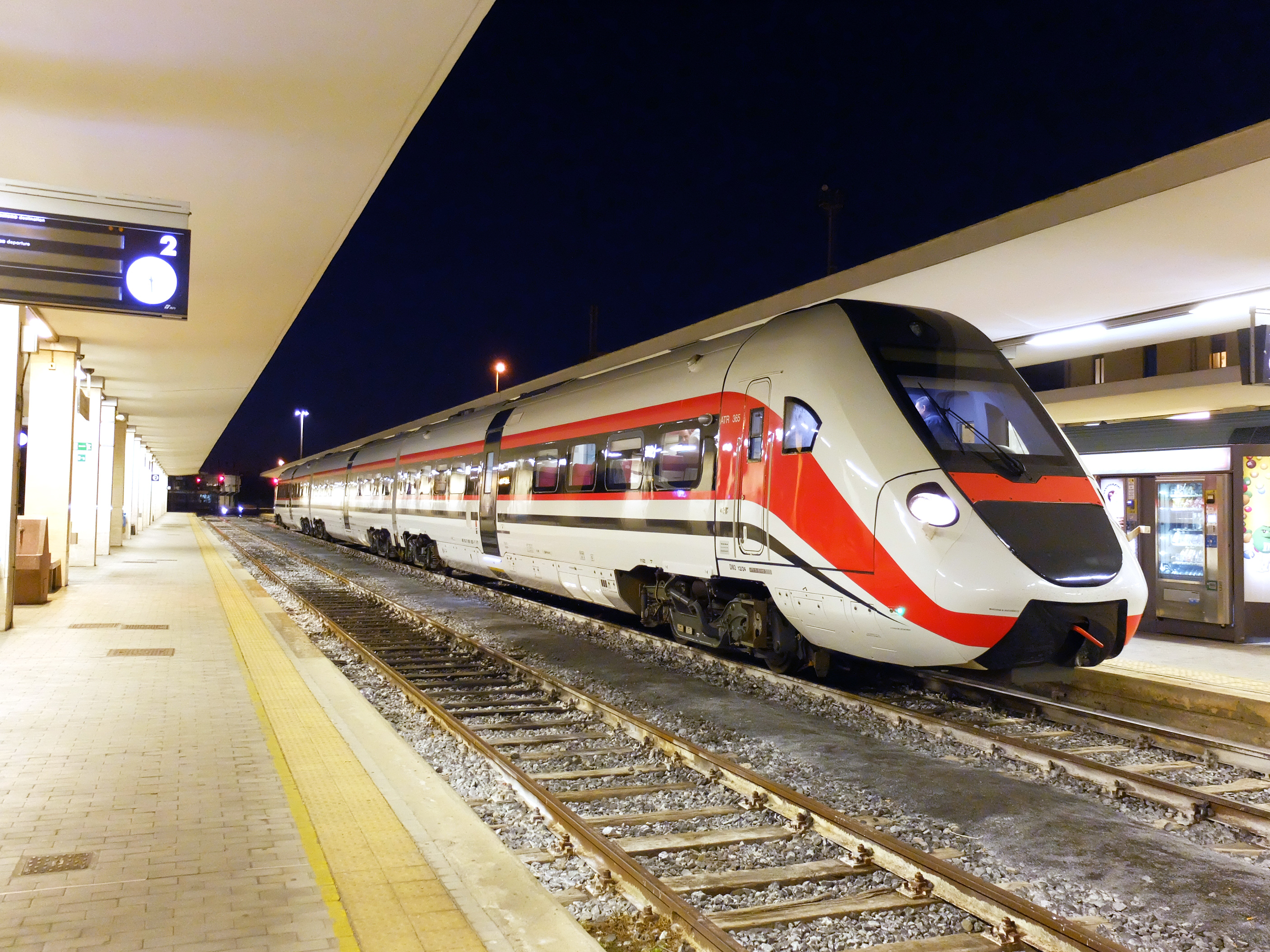
ATR 365 owned by the Autonomous Region of Sardinia in Cagliari

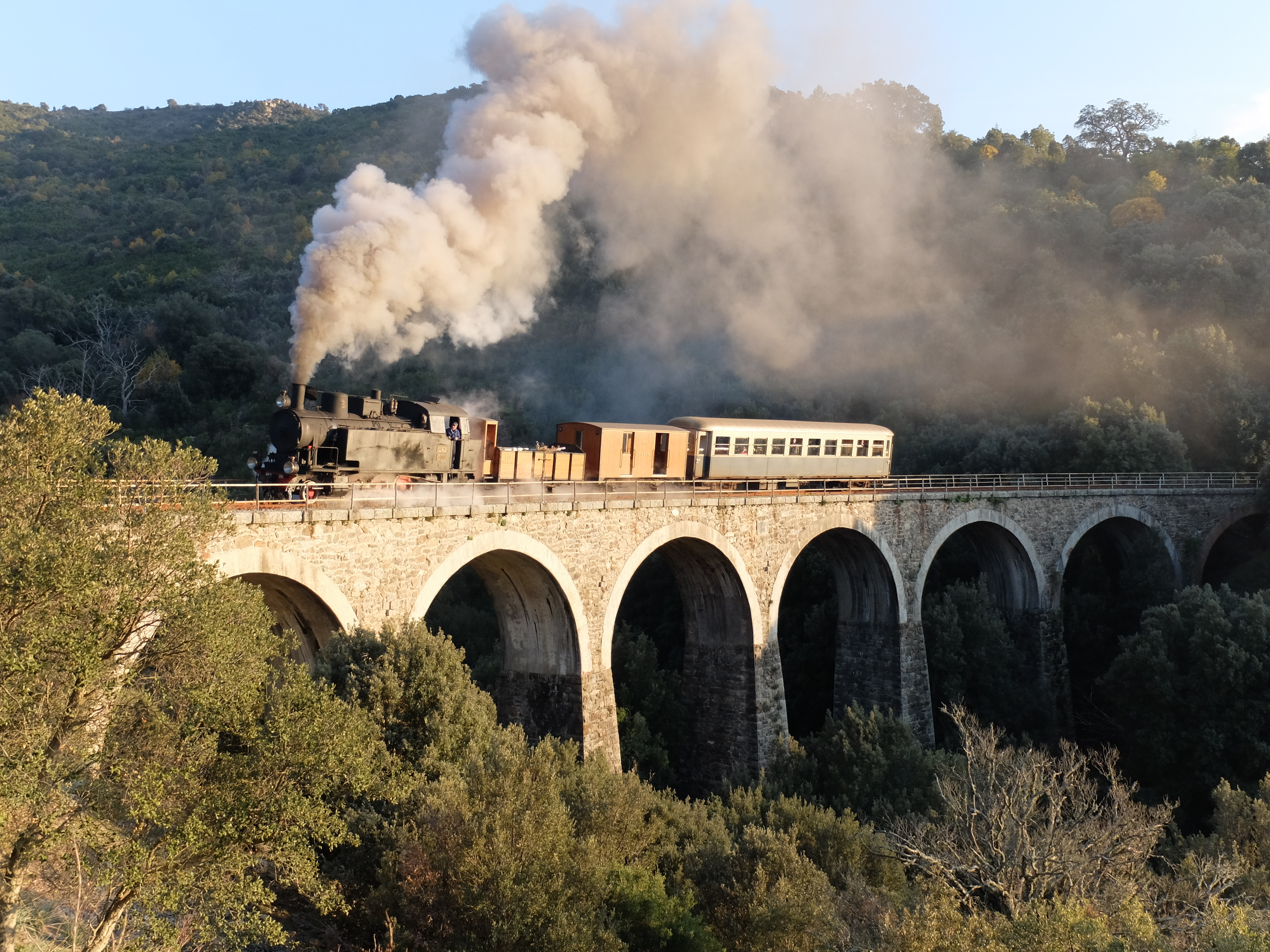
Tourist railway between Aritzo and Belvì

The Sardinian railway system was developed starting from the 19th century by the Welsh engineer Benjamin Piercy.

Today there are two different railway operators:

- Trenitalia which connects the most populated towns and the main ports. This network is the most modern on the island, running primarily diesel locomotives such as the Alstom Minuetto and, from 2015 the faster tilting train CAF ATR365 and ATR 465, specifically designed for the Sardinian railway network;
- ARST: the trains run on narrow-gauge track, are generally slow, due to the tortuosity of the lines, except for the electrified tram-trains operating in the metropolitan areas of Sassari and Cagliari.

The Trenino Verde (Little Green Train) is a railway tourism service operated by ARST. Vintage railcars and steam locomotives run through the wildest parts of the island. They allow the traveller to have scenic views impossible to see from the main roads.

== See also ==
- Space Propulsion Test Facility in Perdasdefogu
- List of islands of Italy
- List of monarchs of Sardinia

== Sources ==
- Brigaglia, Manlio; Mastino, Attilio; Ortu, Gian Giacomo (2006). Storia della Sardegna. Dalle origini al Settecento. Roma-Bari: Laterza Editore. ISBN 978-88-420-7839-5.
- Casula, Francesco Cesare (1994). La Storia di Sardegna. Sassari, it: Carlo Delfino Editore. ISBN 978-88-7138-084-1.
- Ong, Brenda Man Qing; Cacciafoco, Francesco Perono (2022). "Unveiling the Enigmatic Origins of Sardinian Toponyms". Languages. 7 (2): 131: 1–19. doi:10.3390/languages7020131. hdl:10356/159558.
- UNESCO World Heritage Site inscription data for Su Nuraxi di Barumini (2008) "Su Nuraxi di Barumini – UNESCO World Heritage Centre". Whc.unesco.org. 7 December 1997.
