= Porto Flavia =

Sea harbor in Sardinia, Italy

Coordinates: 39°20′13.69″N 8°24′45.21″E

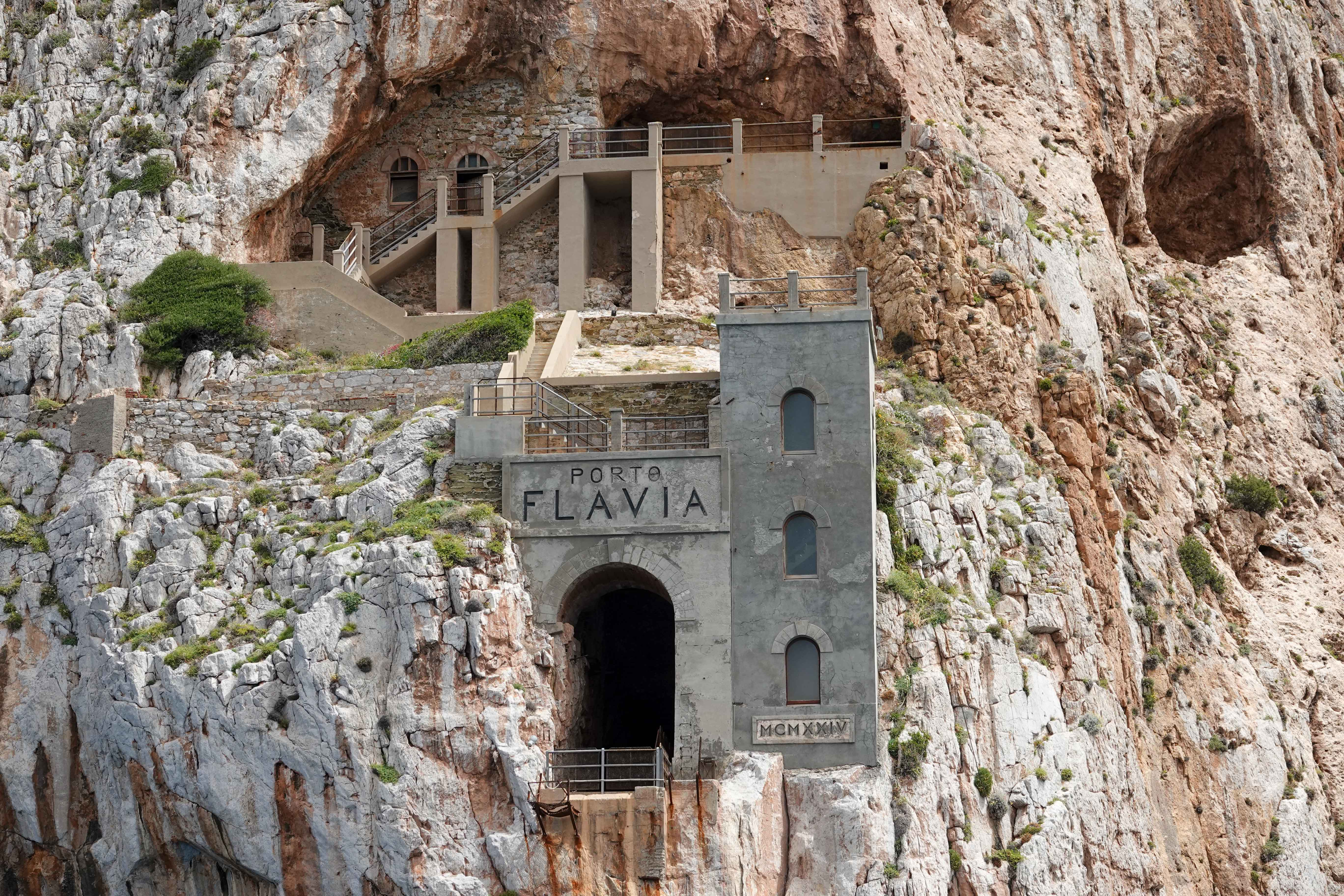
Porto Flavia loading terminal

Porto Flavia is a sea harbor located near Nebida in the Iglesias comune of South Sardinia in Italy. Built in the year 1923–24, it served as the mineral production hub of Masua in the west coast of the Sardinian Iglesiente area. It is named after Flavia Vecelli, the daughter of the harbor's engineer and designer Cesare Vecelli. The harbor's characteristics make it unique in the world, and at the time of its construction it was an outstanding engineering feat.

== Mining production ==
The Masua hub was a complex of several mining operations in the Sulcis area, a region of Sardinia rich in coal, sulphur, barium, zinc, lead, silver and other metals. Extraction began in 1600, but became economically relevant only in the early 1900s when the mining business in the whole region experienced a quick expansion. The extraction, especially of the coal caves, was operated on a low-technology basis until the early 20th century. Since the late 1800s, metal-gathering enjoyed more modern techniques, as it was controlled mostly by rich northern European corporations more willing to commit money in improving the mining efficiency.

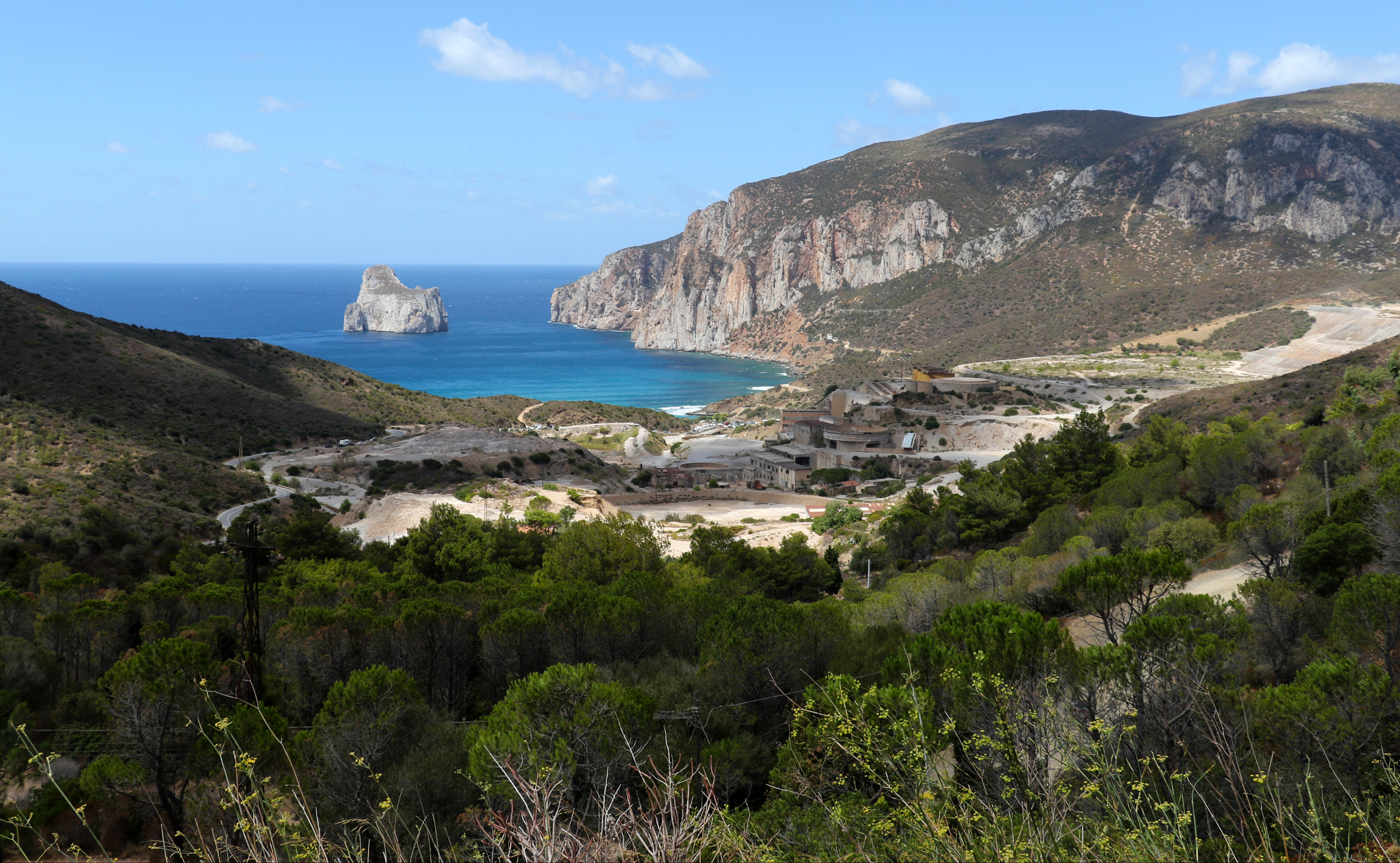
The Masua mines

In 1922, the Masua mines were acquired by the Belgian Vieille Montagne Company, and exploitation increased with the growing need for zinc and lead for reconstruction after World War I as well as because of technological advance in steel alloys. The zinc and lead ore was extracted from the mines by men (aged 16 and above), processed by women and children in a centralized "washing plant" (called Lavatoio), and was finally stored.

Until 1924, sailors from Carloforte moved the processed ore in wicker baskets placed on their shoulders and loaded their bilancelles (a traditional Sardinian boat design with two lateens) to their limits (up to 30 tons per boat). The ore was brought 30 kilometres (19 mi) to Carloforte Island harbor, where it was manually unloaded from the boats. The ore was then stored in the magazines or in the hold of waiting steamships until a full load could be shipped to the foundries in France, Belgium and Germany.

The transport process was costly, slow and dangerous. The bilancelle could not stand stormy seas, especially when loaded with lead, and so the service was discontinued. The boats often sank. Sailors had terrible working conditions with low wages, no rest, and great physical fatigue. In bad weather, up to two months could be needed to fully load a steamship in Carloforte. In good conditions no less than seven days were needed. The cost of the wages for so many workers in addition to the much larger cost of the steamship and quay rent made the transportation of the ore a very significant expense in the production process.

== Designing Porto Flavia ==
The mines' owner asked the Italian engineer Cesare Vecelli to devise a solution to improve steamship loading time and cost. Vecelli surveyed the coasts of Masua, ultimately finding the perfect spot in the high cliffs in front of the Pan di Zucchero stack. Here, the sea was deep enough and well-protected from wind and waves to allow a safe mooring, while the ore could be loaded from the cliffs by gravity.

After one year of study, he devised a detailed plan to build two superimposed tunnels, each 600 metres (2,000 ft) long, that were linked by nine huge vertical reservoirs for the processed ore. In the upper tunnel, an electric train was used to bring the load to the reservoirs: the ore was unloaded by gravity into hatches on top of the reservoirs. In the lower tunnel a conveyor belt received the ore from the reservoirs and brought it to an extensible 16-metre (52 ft) long conveyor belt capable of fully loading a steamship moored at the base of the cliff in about two days. The reservoirs, carved directly into the rock, were capable of holding over 10,000 metric tons (11,000 short tons) of ore.

== Construction ==
A special crew of miners expert in explosives and rock climbing was assembled. They worked in shifts, day and night, to complete the excavations in record time. Despite safety measures being practically ignored to speed up work, no casualties were reported in the building phase. Because the tunnel was without angles or trenches, the usual technique for dynamite-drilling was impossible (the crew used those angles and trenches as shelter while blowing up charges just a few meters away). Instead, small cavities were excavated at regular distances to allow the workers to gain cover after igniting explosives. They are still visible in the guided tour.

The workers began drilling the upper gallery, 37 metres (121 ft) above sea-level, with dynamite and mechanical drills (many mines at the time mostly used pickaxes) until they reached the sea. They then hung from ropes and began drilling the lower tunnel from the cliff-face, 16 metres (52 ft) above sea-level, going the opposite direction under the upper gallery. This way, they could dump the removed rocks directly into the sea. Finally, the reservoirs were excavated by creating holes in the basaltic rock, starting from the bottom of the cavities and going up. This again eased the removal of rubble, although this procedure was very dangerous. Each storage reservoir was 4 to 8 metres (13 to 26 ft) in diameter and 20 metres (66 ft) high.

Venting holes were opened on the side of the galleries. Mechanical iron hatches were installed, along with the electric railway into the upper tunnel. The train brought the ore to the loading hatches of the reservoirs, while in the lower tunnel the unloading hatches fed the ore to the conveyor belt leading to the ships. The belt was covered with a steel casing to prevent the wind blowing away zinc oxide powder. It was extensible, and retracted after a load was delivered to the ship's hold. The main conveyor belt featured an innovative movable alignment system, designed to reduce the risk of the belt escaping the driving wheels under the pressure of the falling ore. The main belt dumped the ore on the slightly lower extensible conveyor belt, which could be protruded for 15 metres (49 ft) and channeled the ore powder into a vertical shaft going to the hold of a moored ship.

Construction took only two years, ending in 1924, a remarkably short period of time for a work of that size. The ends of the tunnels facing the sea were adorned with concrete towers and decorative nameplates. They were not necessary to the operation, but were asked to be constructed by the owner of the company as a mark of prestige. Vecelli's daughter, Flavia, was born earlier in 1924 and the engineer obtained permission from the company to name the harbor after her.

== Operations ==
When Porto Flavia became operative in 1924, it slashed ore production costs by up to 70 percent, allowing Vieille Montagne to gain a strong market share in a short time. The construction of Porto Flavia paid for itself in under two years, and was considered a technical marvel in the mining business. Other mine operators were not allowed to use the tunnel and harbor, still relying on manual labor or on longer railway routes. The opening of Porto Flavia left many sailors from Carloforte without a job, damaging the nearby island economy.

Working conditions in Porto Flavia were better than in the mines because of a functional powder removal system, good venting, natural light, top-class machinery and better wages. But there were lethal accidents: one of the more risky jobs was done by the Squadra della Morte (Death Squad), a special group of workers who had to enter the reservoirs by hanging from above and removing with poles and picks the ore that got stuck on the rocky walls.

Under normal conditions, the plant was able to deliver over 500 metric tons (550 short tons) of ore per hour to a waiting ship.

== Legacy ==
Porto Flavia's importance decreased in the 1960s after the decline of mining activity in Sulcis-Iglesiente, and it was closed in the 1990s when mineral production in Masua ceased. Today, it is owned by IGEA SpA, a public company charged with the restoration and preservation of the old mining plants.

Porto Flavia is a UNESCO-protected site, and is one of the suggested destinations for tours of mining and industrial archaeology sites in the region. Daily tours are held in the tunnel, guided by former workers or mining technicians of IGEA.

== See also ==
- History of mining in Sardinia
