= History of mining in Sardinia =

Mining and the processing of minerals date back to ancient times in Sardinia.

Ancient traders and conquerors, attracted by the astonishing underground riches, were drawn to the island's coast. Evidence of ancient metal processing is given in the many placenames connected with mining: examples include Argentiera, Montiferru, Funtana Raminosa, and Capo Ferrato. The term Gennargentu (silver carrier) comes from Eugenio Marchese, then manager of the mining district of Sardinia, bringing it back to the records of an ancient processing of the precious metal around the village of Talana.

== Prehistory ==
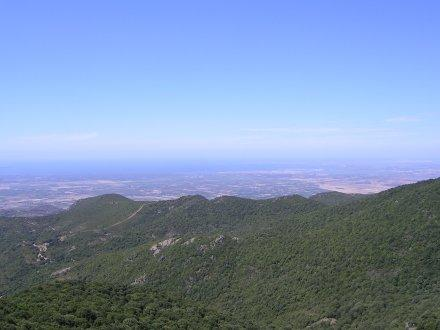
Monte Arci

The long mining history of Sardinia started probably around the 6th millennium BC with the mining of obsidian at the slant of Monte Arci in the central-eastern part of the island. Monte Arci was one of the most important Mediterranean centres for mining and processing of this volcanic glass in the area. As a matter of fact at least seventy processed hectares of land and about 160 steady or temporary settlements have been found from which obsidian was later exported to Southern France and Northern Italy.

About 3000 BC the metal working practices, probably exported there from the Eastern basin of the Mediterranean Sea, expanded into Sardinia too, where they reached a highly practical level. Silver extraction was one of the earliest in Europe, known since the early Chalcolithic. Together with metal working, mining practices also developed allowing the mining of growing amounts of minerals and then of metals.

The geographical position of the island and its mining asset, attracted, between the tenth and the 8th century BC, Phoenician merchants, that were replaced by Carthaginians. Phoenicians and Carthaginians deeply exploited the mining richness, above all in the Iglesiente, where there are some traces of excavations and wastes of fusion ascribable to this period. An intense metal working activity, both in excavation and in fusion, is evidenced by its archaeological viewpoint, by the large ore bodies rich in metal of Sarrabus, made up of minerals compounded by oxides and iron sulphide, copper and lead.

== Roman times ==
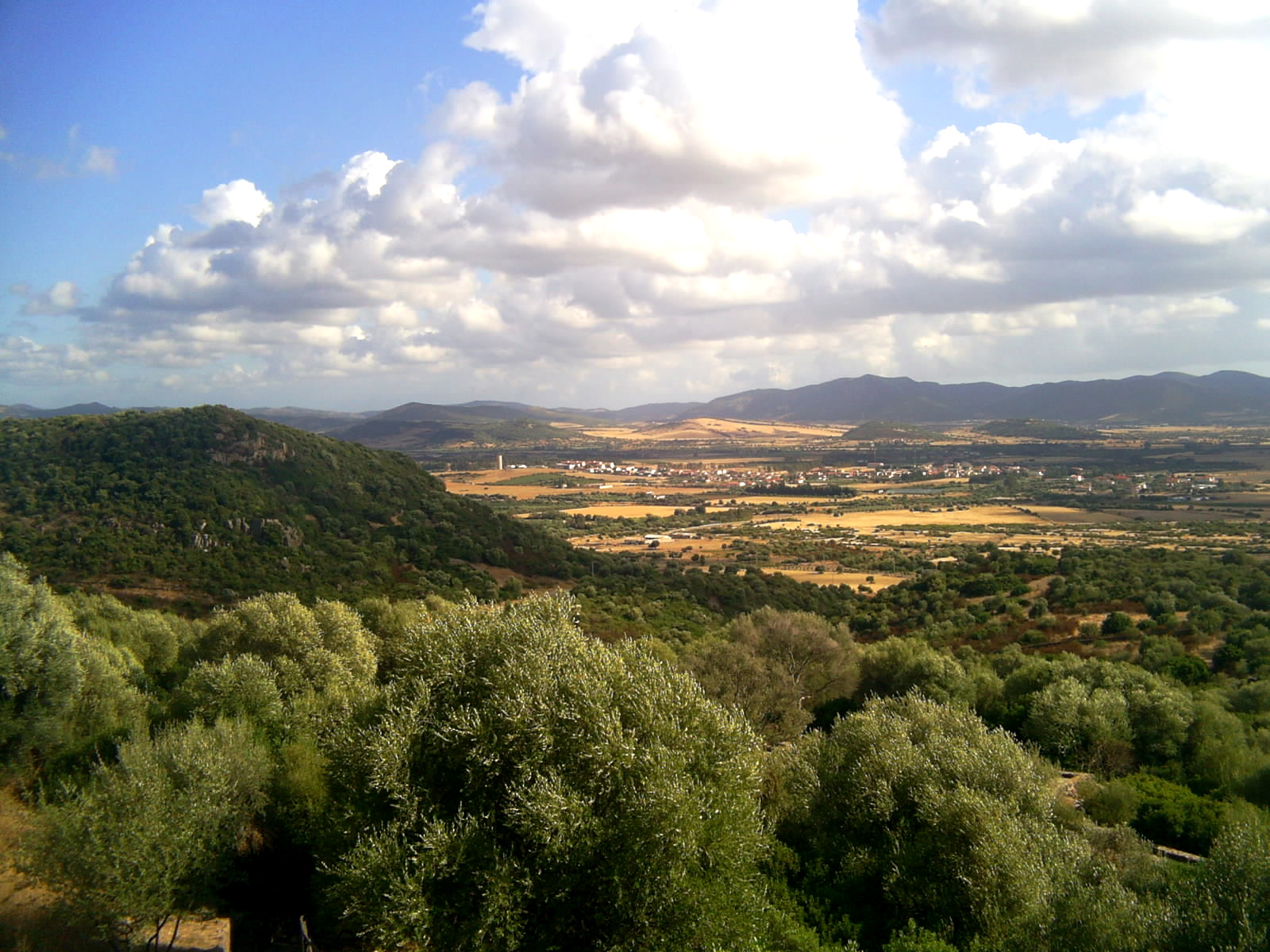
The mining region of Sulcis

In 238 BC, the era of Roman domination began in Sardinia. Carthage was forced to formally cede the island to Rome following defeat in the First Punic War and the upheaval of the mercenaries who were stationed on the island. In 226 BC, Sardinia was granted the status of a Roman province.

Under the Romans mining activity grew strongly, first of all as far as rich gold ore bodies of lead and silver are concerned. Ever since 269 BC the Roman Republic had employed silver as a monetary unit, whereas lead was used in most various fields of civil life, from crockery to water pipes. Sardinia was ranked as the third region, among all Roman dominions, after Spain and Brittany, in the amount of worked metals. Mining production during the whole period of Roman rule was assessed at about six hundred thousand tons of lead and one thousand tons of silver. The mining industry of the Romans was not limited to the basin of the Iglesiente (Metalla), in fact they knew and definitely exploited rich silver ore bodies of Sarrabus, the importance of which the geographer Solinus was referring to when he wrote: "India ebore, argento Sardinia, Attica melle" ("India is famous for ivory, Sardinia for silver and Attica for honey").

The mining development in the Roman era consisted mainly of excavations and shafts — some more than one hundred meters deep — using hand tools and sometimes fire-setting to shatter rocks. Workers were free miners first, called "metallari" and from about 190 onwards were slaves and prisoners called "damnati ad effodienda metalla." In 369 the emperor Valentinian II decreed that each ship landing at Sardinia should pay a tax of 5 solidi for each metallarius on board. Afterwards the emperors Gratian, Valens, and Valentinian II prevented any metallari from moving to the island. There was a fear that the extraordinary richness of Sardinian ore bodies might threaten the silver mines of Spain that were owned by the Emperor.

In the late Roman era, the Sardinian mining industry diminished significantly and, due to the limited needs of the island's market, many mines were relinquished and some of these, like those of the Sarrabus, were forgotten.

== Middle Ages ==
Following the fall of the Western Roman Empire the historical events of Sardinia split up from those of the Italian Peninsula. After the short period of the Vandalic occupation, the island came under Byzantine rule. During the Byzantine rule the mining industry and the metal working activity scored a certain rebirth and silver became again one of the most important export products of Sardinia, although around 700AD trade traffic in the Mediterranean Sea became somewhat difficult because of the plunderings of the Arabs.

For Sardinia the steady plunderings of the Arabs along the coast had been, for a long spell of time, an impending danger that provoked the depopulation of wide coastal areas and the migration of the people towards the inner side of the island.

More and more isolated from the centre of the Byzantine Empire, Sardinia saw in this period the establishment, for the first time in its history, of a real administrative and political autonomy. The island was reorganised into four sovereign and independent kingdoms: the Giudicati of Cagliari, Arborea, Torres and Gallura, after the title of their sovereign (it. giudice, meaning "judge").

There are only a few documents left of the mining history of the period of the giudicati, but it is reasonable to maintain that mining industry was not relinquished at all. In 1131 the judge Gonario II of Torres donated half of the Argentiera of the Nurra to the primatial church of Santa Maria of Pisa, as evidence of the ever-closer political links between the weak Sardinian States and the Tuscan comune.

At the beginning of the 9th century in fact, under the patronage of the Papal Court, that was then ruled by Benedict XIII, in Sardinian history the two Maritime republics of Genoa and Pisa, that were at first allied against the Muslim emir Musa who had taken possession of some areas of the island, were afterwards competing for the dominion on the weak judge states. The defiance ended up in favour of Pisa. The peace of 1087AD between Genoese and Pisans brought, during the period that immediately precedes the Aragonese conquest, the predominance of Pisa across the whole of Sardinia.

From the viewpoint of mining history the Pisan rule seems to be quite well supplied with documentary evidence.

The Pisan family of the Counts of Donoratico, embodied by Ugolino della Gherardesca, enhanced a new start for the mining industry in his dominions in Sardinia and particularly in what is now Iglesiente.

Ugolino operated on a territory of about 590 square kilometers (230 sq mi), called Argentaria del Sigerro for the richness of its underground in silver minerals. He supported moreover the moving into the island of some Tuscan hands, skilled in mining and more generally he tried to repopulate his dominions. The main aim of the demographic policy of the Gherardeschi was the founding and the development of the town of Villa di Chiesa, now Iglesias.

In the Iglesiente, the Pisans resumed the operations of the Romans by opening new shafts and bringing back to daylight the old veins. The strong mining industry, just like political, economic and social life, was ruled by some laws that were gathered in a codex divided into four books, better known as Breve di Villa Chiesa. In this codex the regulations of mining industry, particularly the silver prospecting, plays a major role. The crimes against mining were punished with the utmost rigour: the death penalty was provided for those who stole silver or silvery minerals but also for the foundrymen who mined silver from stolen materials.

Everyone in the territory of the Argentiera could undertake a mining industry, often for this purpose some companies whose participants (parsonavili) possessed quotations of society (trente) were founded. Some members of these companies, so called "bistanti" confined themselves to tender to advance the necessary amount of money.

The operations developed around the digging of ditches and in depth thanks to shafts (bottini) and tunnels. The ongoing vein or of the mineral lens was followed, so that the operation extension was quite limited. To grab on the rocky mass, picks, wedges and other hand tools were employed; sometimes fire was used to break out harder rocks. The working week started at noon on Monday and ended at noon on Saturday. Miners worked for 12 hours a day and during the week they could not leave their work. During summer season operations were stopped because of the unwholesome climate, being mostly coastal areas stricken by the plight of malaria.

It has been calculated that Sardinian mines had supplied Pisa with almost 15 tons a year of the valuable metal in the period stretching from the end of the 12th century to the beginning of the 14th century. Under the Tuscan comune, in the period of brightest splendour the mines around Villa di Chiesa gave shelter to 6500 workers.

In the years around 1326AD Pisa lost its Sardinian dominions to the crown of Aragon. The loss of the island, but first of all of its silver mines, was the commencing of the fall of the Tuscan city that was pressed on the continent by its rivals Lucca and Florence.

The Aragonese crown took upon the rights concerning the exploitation of the rich ore bodies of the silver ore in order to avoid disputes between Aragonese nobles for the mineral richness of the zone. The mining industry level in this period was remarkably reduced if compared to the one of Pisan domination.

Following the total conquest of the island, the Aragonese tried to enhance the silver mining industry: duties were lightened and also taxes and rights owed to the crown for metals. Such policy though could not return Sardinian mines to their past prosperity. Under Aragonese domination first and Spanish after that, the mining industry knew a continuous decay; Sardinia, that for centuries had been one of the most important productive areas for silver, ended up importing the valuable material that was by then coming in large amounts from the Spanish settlements in the New World. Even in this period Sardinian mines did not totally cease to be active, in fact a small domestic market remained.

Under Spanish domination it was decided to subordinate the mining activities to the grant of concessions from the State administration. At least forty concessions for exploration and exploitation of Sardinian ore bodies were assigned. Eight of them were general concessions, extended to the whole territory of the island and eighteen were limited to the circle of Iglesias. The assigners of the territory of the island had to pay to the Treasury 10% of the value of the extracted mineral. The first attempt to enhance the activity of the silver vein of Sarrabus, that had been relinquished for more than one thousand years, dates back to this period. In fact, on 6 June 1622 a certain Gio. Antonio Agus was granted a permit of prospecting around Monte Narba, near the town of San Vito. After no longer than four hundred years the Spanish dominion on Sardinia ended as a consequence of the events connected to the War of the Spanish Succession and to the attempt of reconquest of Cardinal Alberoni.

== The Savoy Era ==
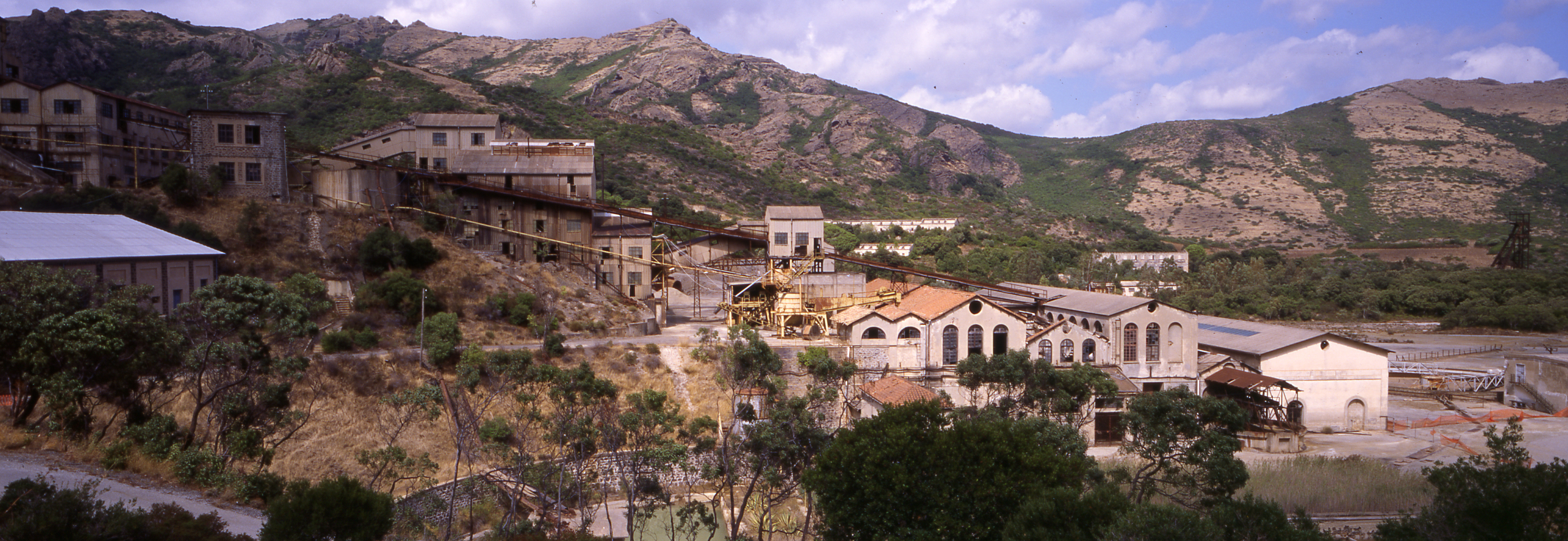
Montevecchio mine in the Sulcis-Iglesiente

In 1720 following the provisions of the Treaty of the Hague the island came under the rule of the House of Savoy, who acquired the title of Kings of Sardinia. The State of the Savoy boosted again the mining industry. Even under the Piedmontese mining was connected to the assignment of general concessions for the execution of research and mining operations on the whole territory of the island. The first who obtained this kind of concession, that lasted twenty years, were Pietro Nieddu and Stefano Durante.

In 1740 the general concession, lasting thirty years, was assigned to the British Charles Brander, to the baron Karl von Holtzendorf and to the Swedish consule in Cagliari Karl Gustav Mandel. According to the agreement, the concessionaries should pay to the King's Treasury 12% of the extracted galena and 2% of the silver for the first 4 years, 5% for the following 6 years and 10% for the remaining 20 years. The obligatory taxes had to be paid at the dispatch for exported commodities and within six months for those that had been sold into the island. The new company, boosted especially by Mandel, introduced some technological innovations, among which the use of the explosive during mining operations. Handwoks skilled in mining industry were brought to Sardinia especially from Germany. Mandel also built by Villacidro a large lead foundry. He was though accused by the Real Intendance of neglecting the exploration of new mines confining himself to exploit the existing ones. An enquiry was also opened for alleged fiscal illegalities that led in 1758 to the repeal of the concession of Mandel.

In 1762 the direction of Sardinian mines came into the hands of the Director of the mining district Pietro De Belly, who hampered private mining industry maintaining it was more profitable for the State to exploit directly the richness of Sardinian underground. Belly tried also to reintroduce forced work in mines and for this reason he merited in 1771 a criticism from Quintino Sella.

Among the shortcomings that should be ascribed to Belly there is also the lack of exploitation of the rich silver vein in Sarrabus, the potentiality of which Mandel had already guessed. Belly maintained it was too costly to mine in this field because of the inaccessible ground and the difficulties in communications in the area. Only within the following century the mineral value of south-eastern region was discovered again.

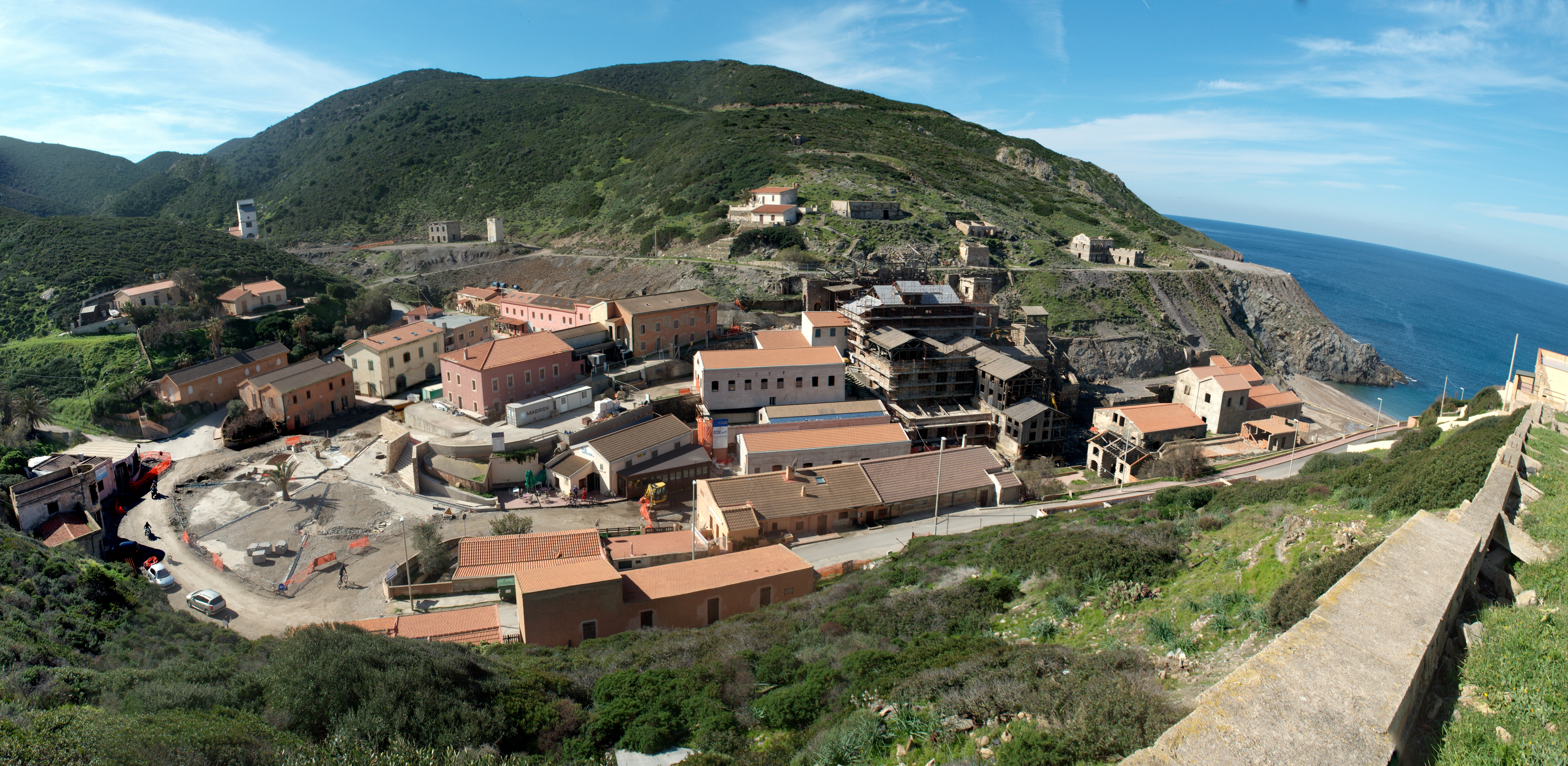
The village of Argentiera, where was located the main silver mine on the island

The last years of the 18th century were anyway important years for Sardinian mining industry; traces of iron were discovered near Arzana and of antimony in the vicinity of Ballao. At the beginning of the 19th century in Sardinia there were 59 mines, mainly of lead, iron, copper and silver. With the renewal of the fervour of mining, some Piedmontese adventurers and from some other European countries had their go too. Among them there was also the French novelist Honoré de Balzac who in 1838 started off a disastrous enterprise that had the purpose of exploiting ancient lead-bearing wastes of the Nurra.

In 1840 the new mining act was passed, which prescribed the separation of property of ground from that of the underground. According to the new act everyone intending to carry out mining prospecting would require authorization: a permit written by the owner of the ground on which the research was to be performed was required, but, if the owner of the ground opposed the request and the refusal was not considered adequately evidenced, the Police chief could act officially to allow the permit. The only obligation due to the concessionary was to pay to the Treasury three per cent of the value of mined minerals and to pay the damages to the landowners for caused damage. This law was fully enacted in Sardinia only in 1848, after the "perfect fusion" between Sardinia and the countries on the continent under the rule of the House of Savoy had completed. The new act eased the achievement of mining concessions, calling back onto the island many managers, particularly from Liguria, Piedmont, and the first Societies, with the purpose of exploiting the promising Sardinian ore bodies.

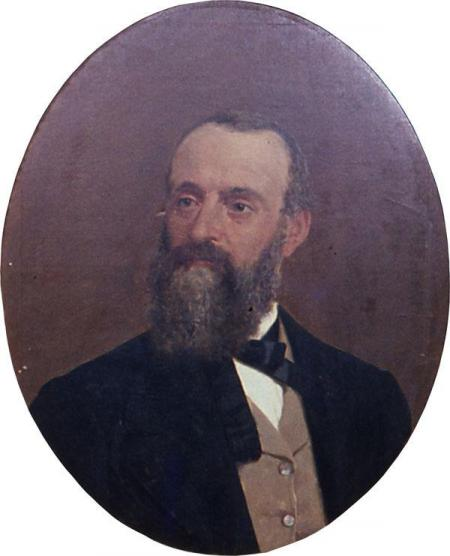
portrait of the entrepreneur Giovanni Antonio Sanna

In 1848 the Sardinian entrepreneur Giovanni Antonio Sanna became the owner of the Montevecchio Mine, localised in the South West of Sardinia, it was the main mining site in Italy. He started modern industrial mining activity in the area.

Among these there was also the "Società Nazionale per la coltivazione di miniere in Sardegna" of Genua that tried in vain to achieve general concession. This kind of concession was in fact formally forbidden by the new act, in order to prevent the establishment of monopolies in mining industry. The project of the National Society came to nothing. The opening of a great number of companies was marked by the same protagonists of the project of the National Society, in order to hold anyway the majority of the highest possible number of permits. The majority of mining societies operating in Sardinia depended then on a non-Sardinian capital money. A remarkable exception was the Sardinian manager Giovanni Antonio Sanna, who achieved in 1848 a perpetual concession on about 1200 hectares located in the area of Montavecchio. Not all societies that were founded in this period had the techniques to launch themselves on the market, many of these went bankruptcy and some other got fused giving birth to greater and more reliable Societies.

In 1858 the exile Enrico Serpieri from the Romagna founded the foundry of Domusnovas for the exploitation of lead mineral in previously processed waste and not so much later of a second one in Fluminimaggiore. In 1862 the two foundries of Serpieri produced 56% of the whole Sardinian lead that had been excavated by previous waste.

Since 1850 limited groups of specialised workers from Styria, Austria, followed by German miners from Freiburg began to settle temporarily in the Iglesiente in particular in the mining areas of Monte Vecchio, Guspini and Ingurtosu . Some German influenced building and toponym is still visible in this area. The contemporaneous migration flow from the Italian peninsula towards the Sardinian mining areas of Iglesiente was more considerable and more stable; these miners came mostly from Lombardy, Piedmont, Tuscany and Romagna. According to an 1882 census realised by the French engineer Leon Goüine, in the south-western Sardinian mines worked 9.780 miners, 3.571 of which were of mainland Italian origin; most of them settled in Iglesias and frazioni .

== After Italian unification ==
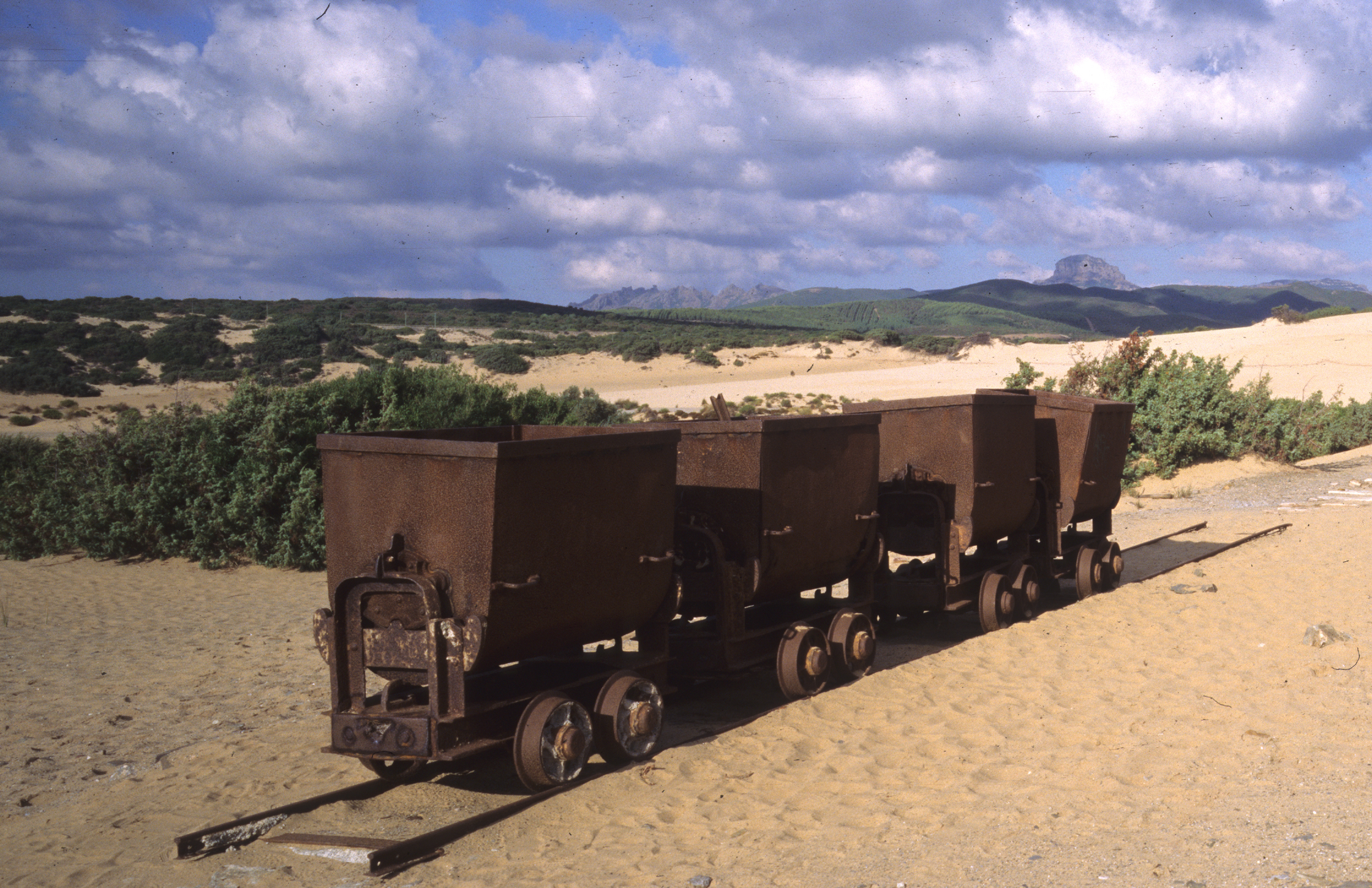
Mine trolleys in Piscinas

From 1865 onward lead and silver, by then the most extracted minerals on the island, were added to a third one, zinc, and in fact that year in the mine of Malfidano in Bugerru, the famous "calamine" (zinc silicates) were found. About 1868 dynamite was introduced in Italy, invented the year before by the Swedish chemist Alfred Nobel. Within a short time this invention revolutionised the mining techniques allowing the operation at relatively low costs even in humid yards. Meanwhile, the uneasiness of Sardinia within the recently constituted Italian State was growing up. In 1867 Sardinian members of parliament asked Prime Minister Bettino Ricasoli for a greater commitment of the State to alleviate poverty conditions of the people on the island. In April 1868 the social malaise caused in Nuoro big unrest: the whole population raised cries shouting su connottu! su connottu! against the sale of the State-owned grounds. After that a parliamentary inquiry commission headed at constituted a document of extraordinary importance for the knowledge of the topic. During a journey that lasted 18 days Sella, accompanied by the engineer Eugenio Marchese, manager of the mining district of Sardinia, visited the main mines and the metal-working factories of the island.

From his report the growing importance of the knowledge of the topic emerged within the Italian economy. In 1868–1869 in Sardinian mines there were 9,171 employees, almost three times as many as in 1860. In fact, following the extension to Sardinia of the mining act of 1840 of Piedmont and its following modification of 1859 in order to be more favourable for mining entrepreneurs, a swift development of researches and mining, an increase in production and employed hands was recorded. In 1870 the permits for research, that were 83 by the end of 1861 increased to 420 and the concessions from 16 to 32, The extracted mineral increased from 9,379,800 kilograms in 1860 to 127,924,600 kilograms in 1868 while its value got five times as high achieving in 1868–1869 the amount of £13.464.780.

From Sella's report it also comes out that, in order to ease the transportation of mineral to the landing points, up to 1870 the mining societies had built about 30 kilometers of railways and 1081 kilometers of land roads.

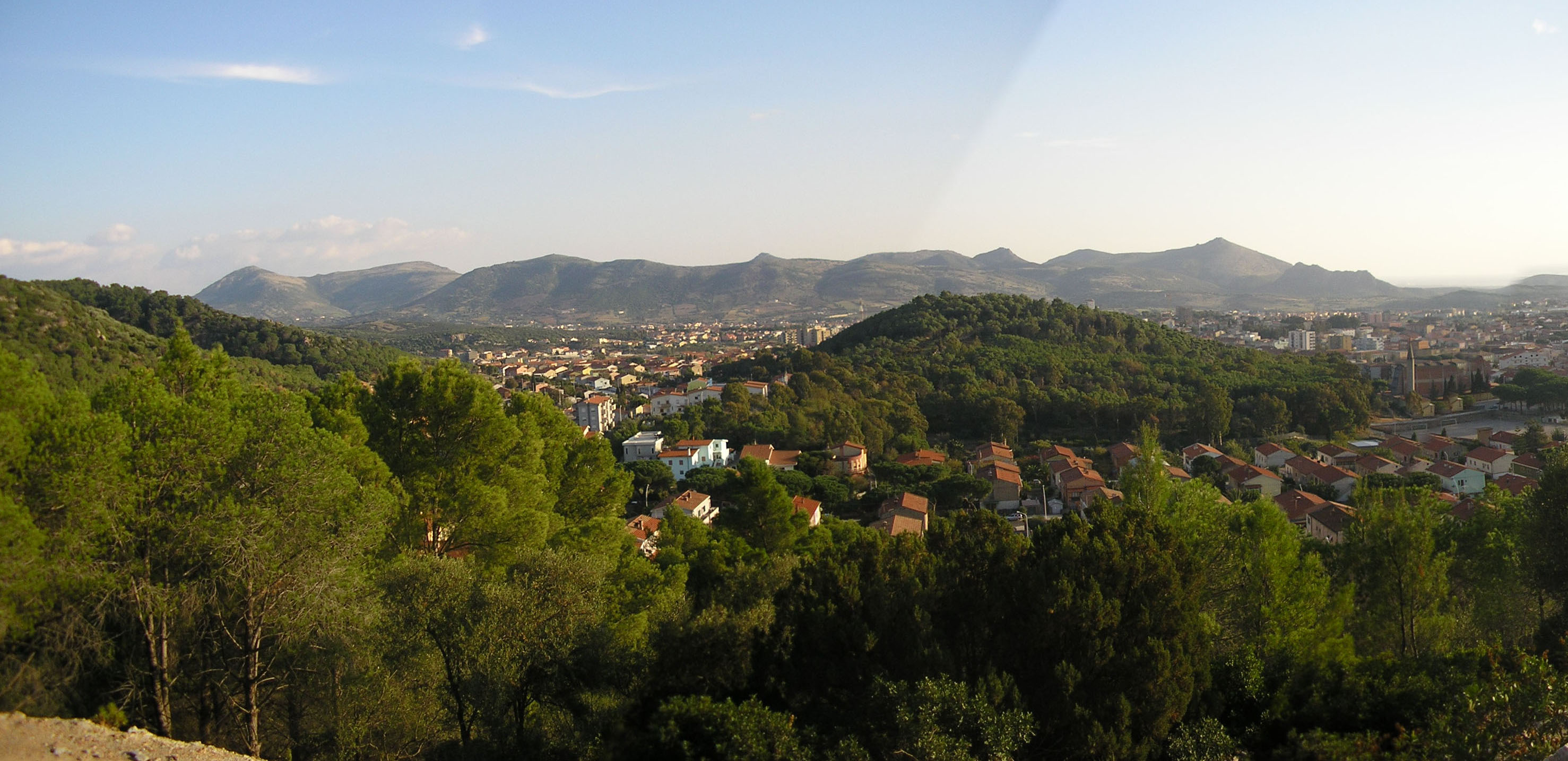
Carbonia, the "City of the Coal" founded in 1930's

The steady development of mining industry led to the flow of technicians (engineers and geologists) and board employees from other regions of the kingdom. Because of the poor level of education and technical preparation of Sardinian hands, even the majority of qualified hands employed in mines came from the continent. Most of times the management of mining societies that operated on the island was set on criteria that could have been quietly defined as colonial; that is why very often these were confined to the exploitation of the richest parts of mined veins, transferring then out of Sardinia the mined material that was processed on plants located on the continent. The large proceeds coming from the exploitation of Sardinian mines were not invested again on the spot unless to ease the operation of the company. Sella's inquiry did not reveal the economic treatment inequities between Sardinian miners and those with a continental origin, not to mention the need to found a school for foundrymen and mining managers in Iglesias. The report ended with the recommendations that more capital should be invested to improve mining industry, first of all the emergency of building a road network between mines and of completing railways. The need of carrying out and developing an adequate telegraph communication network was also highlighted: Sella points out that the main mining companies demanded to be able to build, at their own expense, new telegraph lines in order to make communications faster. Such purpose was though made useless by the act that guaranteed the State the monopoly in the building of these important structures.

In 1872 the seat of the Sardinian Mining District was moved from Cagliari to Iglesias.

The year before, in 1871, the Italian mining activity had known the birth of a new industry. With the ultimate discovery and the beginning of mining, of silver-bearing vein of Saarabus, even in Italy the production of silvery minerals was commenced. A new production cycle lasting about forty years had begun.

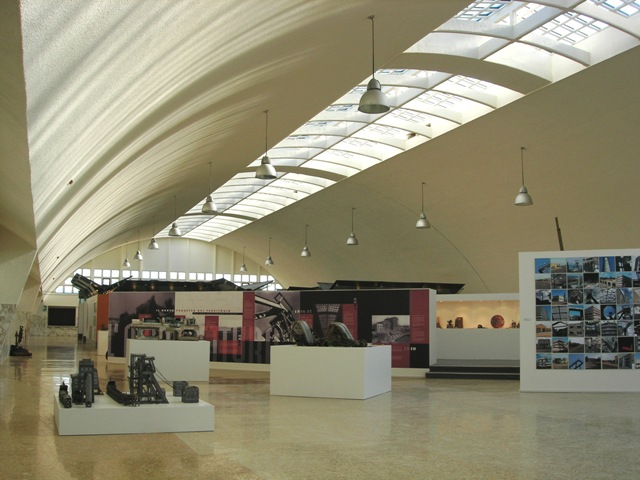
Museum of the Coal in Carbonia

Within a short period from fifteen million tons of mined minerals in 1871, the year in which the discovery of the Mine of Monte Narba was declared, 2000 average tons a year were achieved and produced within the ten years between 1880 and 1890, that Rolandi defined as "silvery ten-year-span-of-time", in which productions reached the value of two millions lire. From the three mines that were constituted on the ore body in 1871, they increased to ten within twenty years to decrease later in order to become only one when it came to close it for good. In Sarrabus it came to a real quest for silver: together with big societies, such as the Society of Lanusei and the society of Monteponi, many extemporised diggers of valuable metals demanded hundreds of permits to carry out mineral searches on the territories of the towns of Muravera, Villaputzu and, particularly, of San Vito. In 1851 the Genuese company "Unione Sulcis e Sarrabus" acquired the research permits in the area of Monte Narba, in the comune of San Vito. In 1885 the French engineer Leon Goüin founded in Genua the "Società Tacconis-Sarrabus" for the exploitation of the Tacconis mine. In 1888 Goüin himself constituted in Paris the "Societé des mines de Rio Ollastu". In its most flourishing period the ore body of the Sarrabus employed up to 1500 workers, distributed among the mines of Masaloni, Giovanni Bonu, Monte Narba, Per'Arba, Baccu Arrodas, Tuviois, S'erra e S'Ilixi and Nicola Secci. Just to have a more precise idea of the quality value of the silver ore body of the Sarrabus we can say that, while in the rest of the world the average silver revenue for 100 kilograms of lead was swaying around 200/300 grams, in the body of the Sarrabus was achieved an average of 1 kilogram for 100 kilograms. In Baccu Arrodas the assays were much higher.

In the 1930s there was extensive emigration from the mainland during the Fascist government when people from Veneto but also from Marche, Abruzzo and Sicily came to Sardinia to populate the new mining towns founded in the Sulcis-Iglesiente region such as Carbonia and Cortoghiana, supplying Sardinia's coal power plants for decades.

Map of the Geomineral Park of Sardinia

The Geomineral Park of Sardinia, founded in 1989, and supported by UNESCO, today preserves the ancient mines and the ex mining villages that are become examples of industrial archeology.

== Bibliography ==
- Atti della commissione parliamentare d'inchiesta sulla condizione degli operai delle miniere in Sardegna, Roma 1911, tipog. della Camera dei deputati.
- Cauli B., Dall'ossidiana all'oro: sintesi di storia mineraria sarda, Oristano 1996.
- Frongia G., Igiene e miniere in Sardegna, Roma 1911.
- Manconi F., Le miniere e i minatori della Sardegna, Milano 1986.
- Marchese E., La legge sulle miniere in Sardegna. Considerazioni, Genova 1869.
- Marchese E., Quintino Sella in Sardegna. Ricordi dell'ingegner Eugenio Marchese, Torino 1893.
- Mezzolani S., Simoncini A., La miniera d'argento di Monte Narba, storia e ricordi, Cagliari 1989.
- Mezzolani S., Simoncini A., Paesaggi ed architetture delle miniere in Sardegna da salvare, volume XIII, Sassari 1993.
- Mezzolani S., Simoncini A., Storie di miniera, Unione sarda, Cagliari 1994.
- Sella Q., Relazione alla Commissione Parliamentare d'Inchiesta sulle condizioni dell'industria mineraria in Sardegna, Firenze 1871.
- Sotgiu G., Storia della Sardegna dopo l'unità, Bari 1986.
