= Nuraghe Seruci =

Coordinates: 39.2492°N 8.4244°E

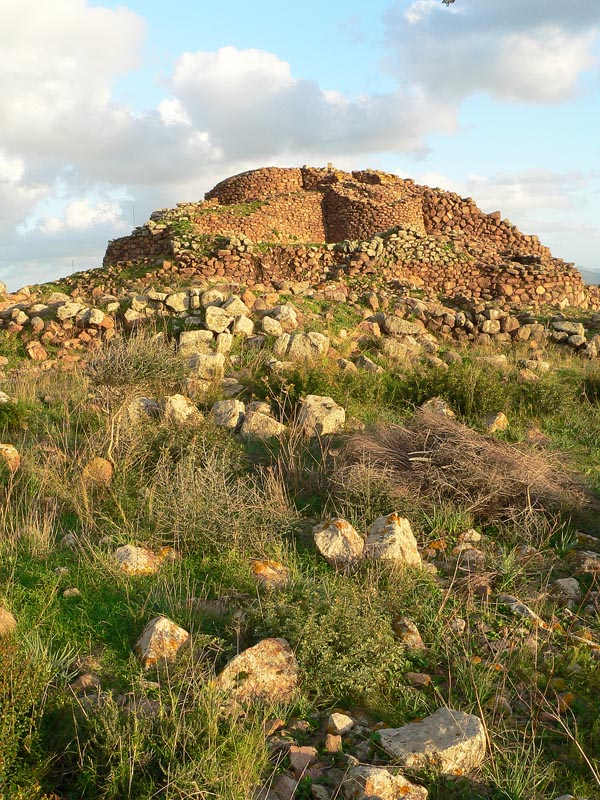
- Nuraghe Seruci
- Interactive map of Nuraghe Seruci
- Type: Settlement
- Periods: Bronze Age
- Cultures: Nuragic civilization
- Location: Gonnesa, Sardinia, Italy

The nuraghe Seruci is an important archaeological site, located in the municipality of Gonnesa, in the Iglesiente region of Sardinia.

== The nuraghe ==
The nuraghe is of the complex type, it consists of a central tower surrounded by five or six other towers, some of which are in good condition. The towers have their summit collapsed but originally their tops were crowned with shelves in stone. The nuraghe is surrounded by a wall.

From the nuraghe, being located in a hill of strategic importance near the sea, is possible to observe the entire surrounding area.

== The village ==
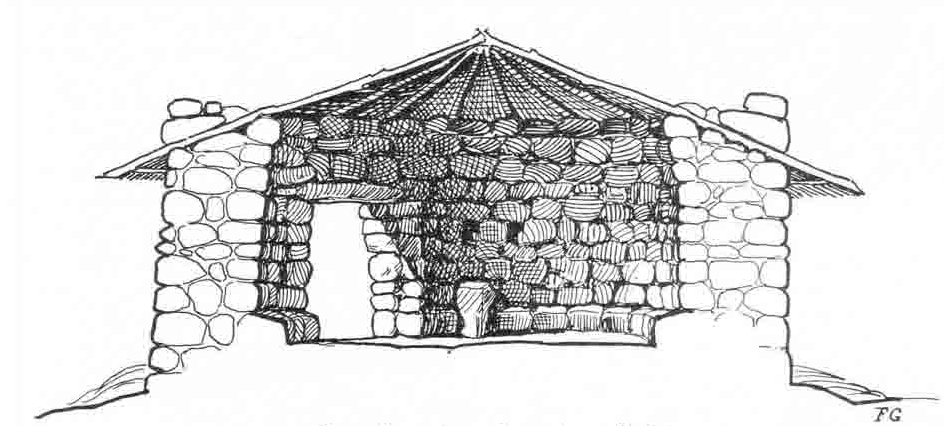
Seruci hut

The nuraghe is surrounded by a village, one of the largest in Sardinia, with about a hundred huts grouped in six "residential areas" divided by narrow streets. The settlements covers 6 hectares, the huts are circular and in some of them is possible to see the use of architectural solutions that are rarely found in the other nuraghic villages; for example the use of partition walls inside of the huts and the addition of other environments of varying shape around the usual living environment.

At the center of the village is located a hut of vast size that probably was the meeting hut of the community.

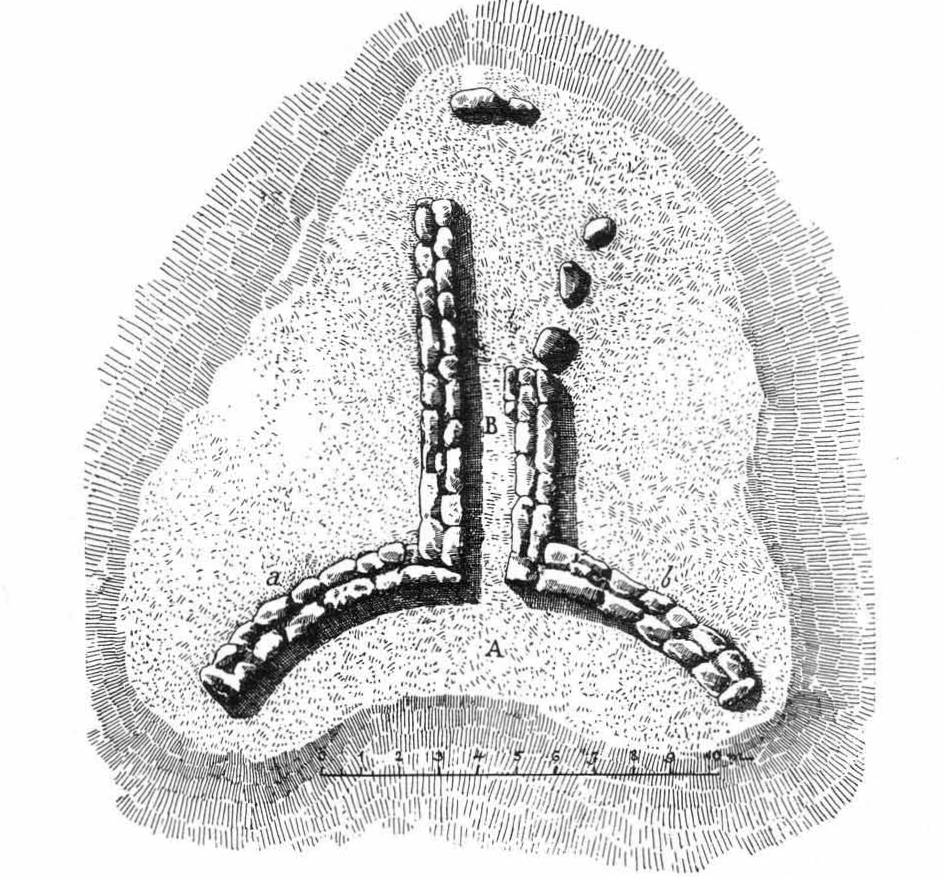
Plan of the giants' tomb located in the nearby hill

In a hill near the village and the nuraghe is also present one giants' tomb, the typical burials of nuragic Sardinia.

== Bibliography ==
- A. Taramelli, Gonnesa - Indagini nella cittadella nuragica di Seruci (Cagliari), in Monumenti antichi della Reale Accademia dei Lincei, XXIX, 1917;
- V. Santoni-G. Bacco, L'isolato A del villaggio nuragico di Seruci-Gonnesa. Lo scavo della capanna 5, in Un millennio di relazioni tra la Sardegna e i paesi del Mediterraneo, Cagliari, 1987;
- V. Santoni-G. Bacco, L'isolato A del villaggio nuragico di Seruci-Gonnesa: lo scavo dei vani 3 e 6, in Quaderni della Soprintendenza Archeologica per le province di Cagliari e Oristano, 5, 1988.
