= Sulcis-Iglesiente =

Historical region of southwestern Sardinia

Coordinates: 39.116°N 8.7°E

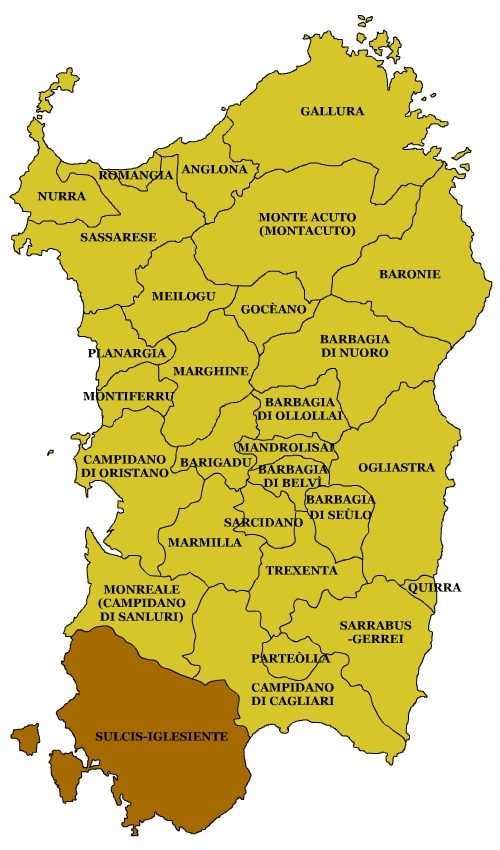
Sulcis-Iglesiente

The Sulcis-Iglesiente is a historical region of southwestern Sardinia comprising, as the name suggests, the territories of Sulcis and Iglesiente. It is included in the Province of Sulcis Iglesiente and the Metropolitan City of Cagliari, and formerly in the province of South Sardinia.

In the Middle Ages the territory belonged to the Judicate of Cagliari, and in particular to the curatorias of Cixerri, Sulcis and Nora.

The subregion, which also includes the little islands of Sant'Antioco and San Pietro, is mainly known for the mining activities of many minerals in the territory of Iglesias and for that concerning the extraction of coal in the mines of the Sulcis.

The main towns are Iglesias and Carbonia. Both towns were founded to encourage mining activities, the first in 1272 circa and the second in 1938.
