= Portoscuso Wind Farm =

Proposed Italian wind power project

- Country: Italy
- Location: Portoscuso, Sardinia
- Status: Proposed
- Commission date: 2012
- Owner: Enel Green Power

Power generation
- Units operational: 39
- Nameplate capacity: 90 MW

The Portoscuso Wind Farm is a proposed wind power project in Portoscuso, Sardinia, Italy. It will have 39 individual wind turbines with a nominal output of around 2.3 MW each which will deliver up to 90 MW of power, enough to power over 70,000 homes, with a capital investment required of approximately €100 million. The wind farm will have an electricity production of 185 GWh per year that will save the emission of 130,000 tonnes of carbon dioxide.
