= Gonnesa =

- Comune
- Comune di Gonnesa
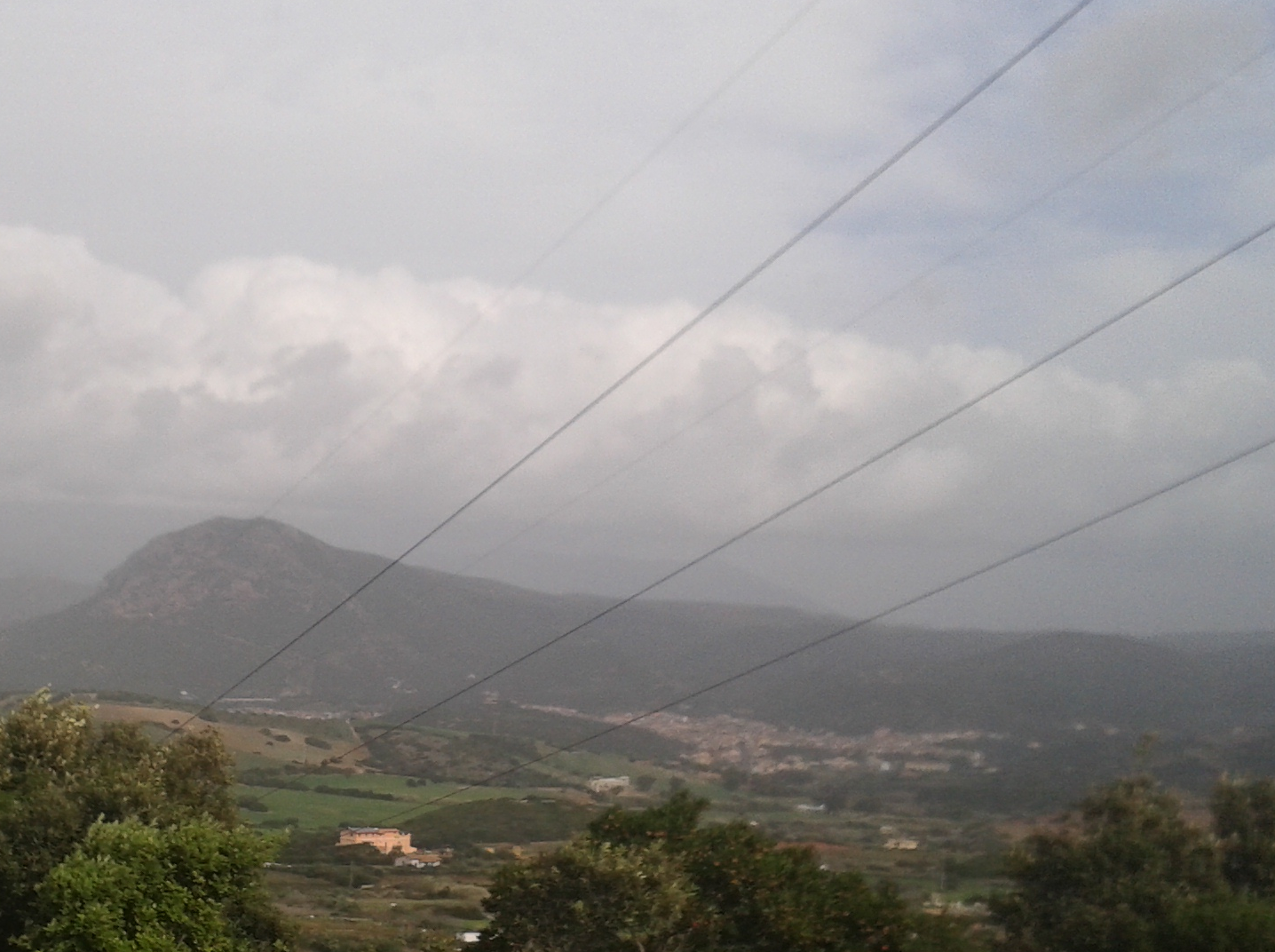
- View of Gonnesa

- Coat of arms

- Location within Sardinia
- Coordinates: 39°16′N 8°28′E
- Country: Italy
- Region: Sardinia
- Province: Sulcis Iglesiente
- Frazioni: Normann, Nuraxi Figus

Government
  - Mayor: Hansel Cabiddu

Area
  - Total: 48.06 km^{2} (18.56 sq mi)
- Elevation: 40 m (130 ft)

Population (2026)
  - Total: 4,456
  - Density: 92.72/km^{2} (240.1/sq mi)
- Demonym: Gonnesini
- Time zone: UTC+1 (CET)
  - Summer (DST): UTC+2 (CEST)
- Postal code: 09010
- Dialing code: 0781
- Patron saint: St. Andrew
- Saint day: 30 November
- Website: Official website

Gonnesa is a town and comune (municipality) in the Province of Sulcis Iglesiente in the autonomous island region of Sardinia in Italy, located about 60 kilometres (37 mi) west of Cagliari and about 14 kilometres (9 mi) northwest of Carbonia, in the Iglesiente subregion. It has 4,456 inhabitants.

In the Municipality of Gonnesa is located the mine of Nuraxi Figus, the last active coal mine in Italy today.

In its territory there is an important archaeological site, the Nuraghe Seruci, and beach of almost 4 kilometres (2 mi) along which it is possible to surf, especially in a spot called Funtanamare. The other two spots are called Plag' 'e Mesu ("Middle Beach" in Sardinian language, and Porto Paglia. Gonnesa borders the municipalities of Carbonia, Iglesias, and Portoscuso.

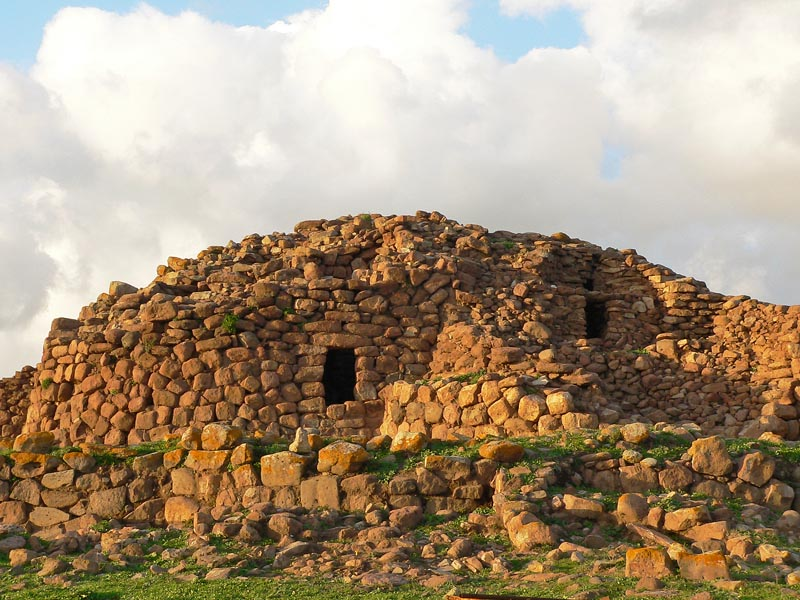
Nuraghe Seruci

== History ==
The town was refounded in the late 18th century by the local feudatory. During the 19th century its territory was affected by the resumption of mining which contributed significantly to its population growth.

== Demographics ==
As of 2026, the population is 4,456, of which 49.7% are male, and 50.3% are female. Minors make up 10.5% of the population, and seniors make up 32.9%.

Historical population

Year	Pop.	±%
1861	960	—
1871	1,251	+30.3%
1881	1,686	+34.8%
1901	3,243	+92.3%
1911	2,847	−12.2%
1921	3,582	+25.8%
1931	4,302	+20.1%
1936	4,240	−1.4%

Year	Pop.	±%
1951	5,571	+31.4%
1961	5,366	−3.7%
1971	4,887	−8.9%
1981	5,202	+6.4%
1991	5,458	+4.9%
2001	5,169	−5.3%
2011	5,135	−0.7%
2021	4,697	−8.5%

Source: ISTAT

=== Immigration ===
As of 2025, immigrants make up 2.5% of the total population. The 5 largest foreign countries of birth are Germany, Romania, Morocco, Russia, and China.
