= Carbosulcis coal mine =

Coal mine in Sardinia, Italy

Coordinates: 39.209°N 8.438°E

Carbosulcis Coal Mine
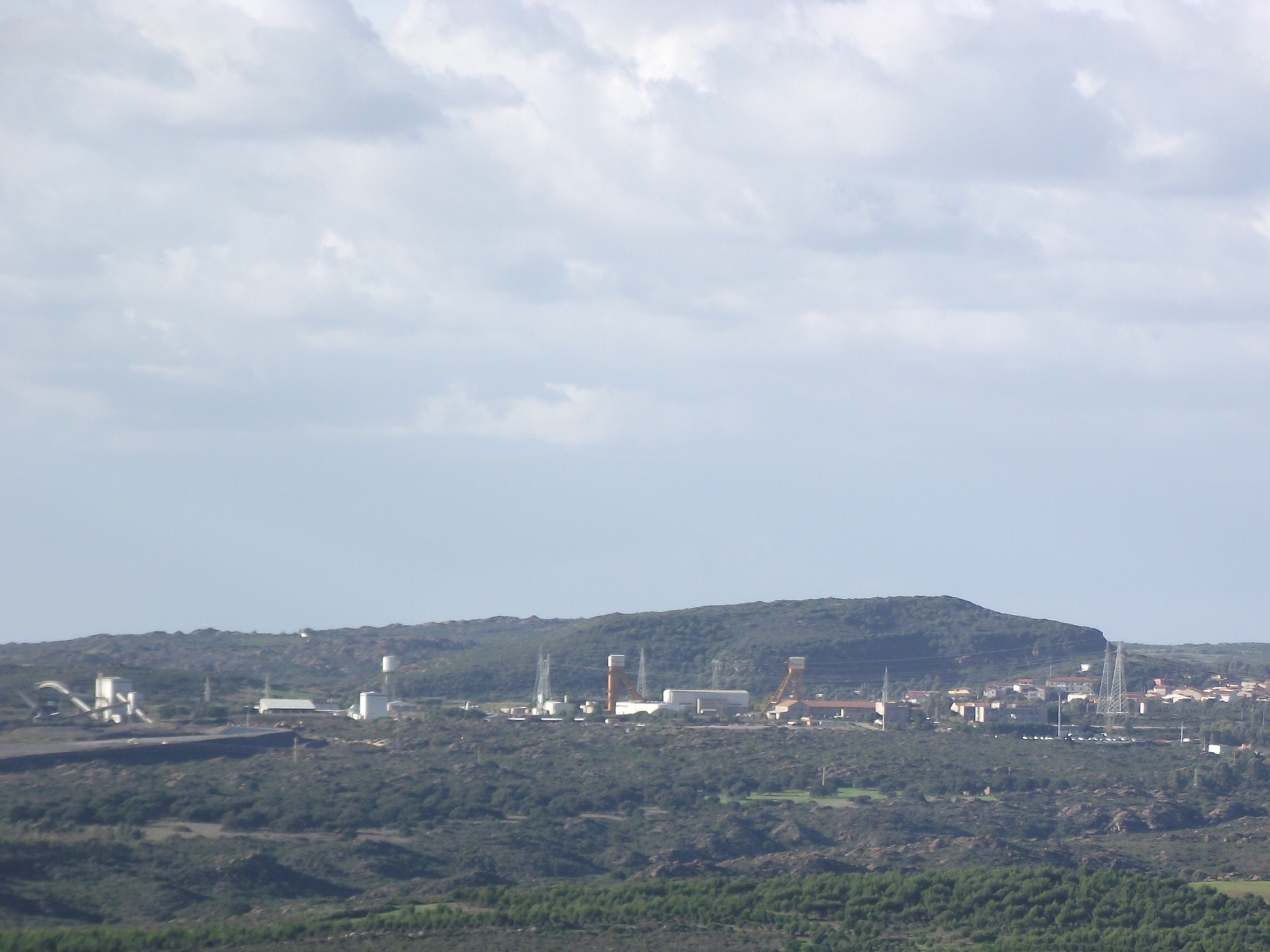
- The Nuraxi Figus coalmine in Gonnesa, Sardinia, Italy, seen from Monte Sirai.
- Interactive map of Carbosulcis Coal Mine
- Location: Sardinia, Italy
- Products: sub-bituminous coal

The Carbosulcis Coal Mine (or Nuraxi Figus) is a coal mine located in Sardinia, Italy. The mine is located near the town of Nuraxi Figus, which itself is approximately 7 kilometers from the town and municipality of Gonnesa. The mine has coal reserves amounting to 2.5 billion tonnes of sub-bituminous coal, one of the largest coal reserves in Europe and the world. Coal production activities at the mine ended in 2018, following a negotiation with the European Commission concerning state aid to the mine. Its annual production capacity in 2012 amounted to 1.5 million tonnes. In 2024, the mine owner agreed to use the mine for a pumped hydro energy storage project beginning in 2026.
