= Portoscuso =

Italian municipality

Portoscuso Portescusi (Sardinian)
- Comune
- Comune di Portoscuso
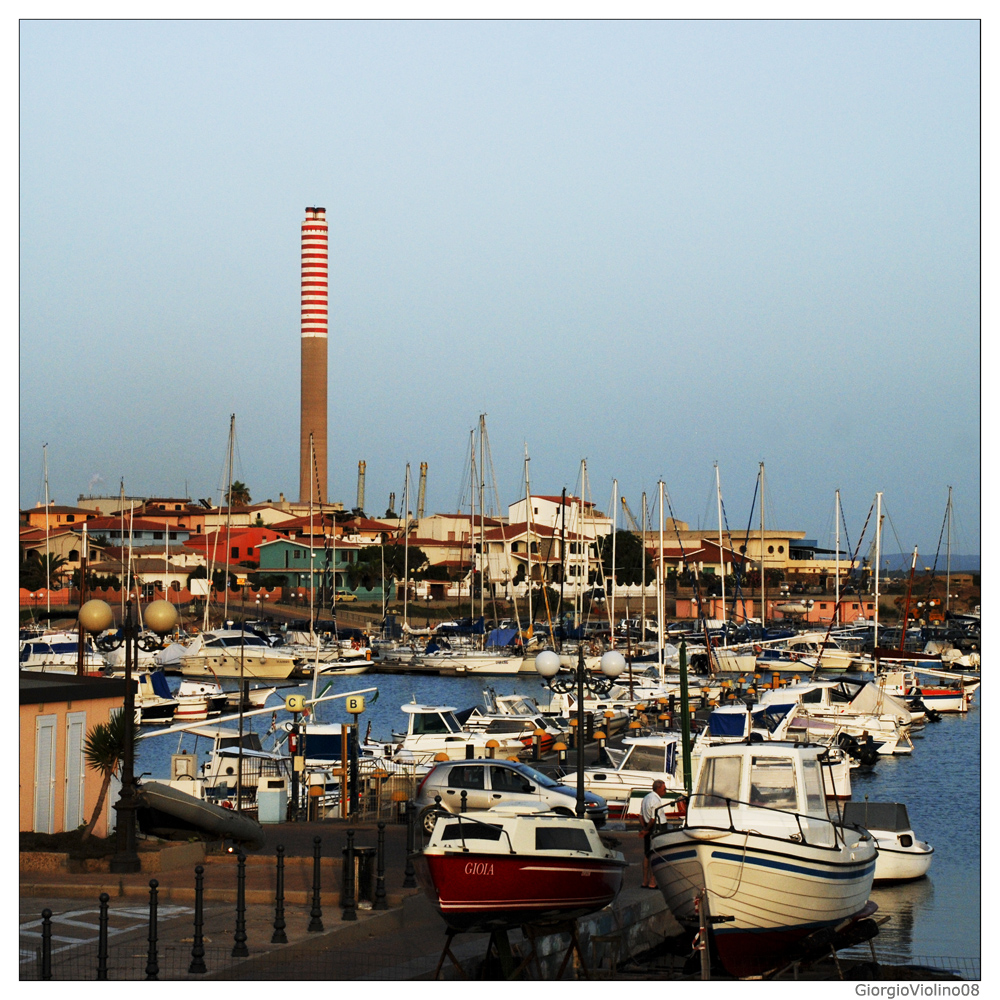
- Touristic port of Portoscuso

- Coat of arms

- Location within Sardinia
- Coordinates: 39°13′N 8°23′E
- Country: Italy
- Region: Sardinia
- Province: Sulcis Iglesiente
- Frazioni: Paringianu, Brunc' 'e Teula, Portovesme

Government
  - Mayor: Ignazio Atzori

Area
  - Total: 38.09 km^{2} (14.71 sq mi)
- Elevation: 6 m (20 ft)

Population (2026)
  - Total: 4,689
  - Density: 123.1/km^{2} (318.8/sq mi)
- Demonym: Portoscusesi
- Time zone: UTC+1 (CET)
  - Summer (DST): UTC+2 (CEST)
- Postal code: 09010
- Dialing code: 0781
- Patron saint: San Giovanni Battista (John the Baptist), Santa Maria d'Itria
- Website: Official website

Portoscuso (Sardinian: Portescusi) is a town and comune (municipality) in the Province of Sulcis Iglesiente in the autonomous island region of Sardinia in Italy, located about 75 kilometres (47 mi) west of Cagliari and about 14 kilometres (9 mi) northwest of Carbonia. It has 4,689 inhabitants, who mainly speak Italian and Sardinian Campidanese.

Portoscuso borders the municipalities of Carbonia, Gonnesa, and San Giovanni Suergiu.

Notable sights include the Spanish Tower (16th century), the church of Madonna d'Itria (17th century) and the Arsenal, known as Su Pranu (17th century).

The town has a famous tuna fishery, and is restoring the original buildings.

== History ==
Human presence in this territory dates back to Neolithic times. Bronze Age sites include the ruins of several Nuraghe (e.g. Baccu Ollasta) and the rock shelter of Punta Niedda, where the bones of 6 individuals and various objects of the Bonnanaro culture were recovered in the 1940s.

The area was then frequented by the Phoenicians, followed by the Punics and the Romans of whose passage some evidence remains, in particular regarding the funerary aspect, with the necropolises in the San Giorgio and Piccinu Mortu areas.

In the Middle Age this territory, as the rest of the Sulcis region, was part of the Giudicato of Cagliari until 1258, then it was part of the Della Gherardesca possessions and later, from 1324, part of the Kingdom of Sardinia, one of the kingdoms forming the Crown of Aragon.

The town originated in the 17th century from a hamlet inhabited by tuna and coral fishermen. Its name came from the Catalan Puerto Escos (hidden port). It became a municipality in 1853, during the rule of the House of Savoy.

After the Second World War, the industrial center of Portovesme developed during the 1960s and 1970s.

== Demographics ==
As of 2026, the population is 4,689, of which 49.4% are male, and 50.6% are female. Minors make up 11.0% of the population, and seniors make up 32.2%.

Historical population

Year	Pop.	±%
1861	502	—
1871	676	+34.7%
1881	788	+16.6%
1901	1,161	+47.3%
1911	1,294	+11.5%
1921	1,693	+30.8%
1931	1,936	+14.4%
1936	2,070	+6.9%

Year	Pop.	±%
1951	2,535	+22.5%
1961	3,615	+42.6%
1971	4,800	+32.8%
1981	5,670	+18.1%
1991	5,868	+3.5%
2001	5,392	−8.1%
2011	5,236	−2.9%
2021	4,869	−7.0%

Source: ISTAT

=== Immigration ===
As of 2025, immigrants make up 3.2% of the total population. The 5 largest foreign countries of birth are France, Morocco, Germany, Romania, and China.

== Economy ==
At Portoscuso there is Sulcis Power Station, the largest power station of Sardinia, whose chimney is the tallest man-made structure on Sardinia.

As of 2023, Portoscuso is the municipality with the highest per capita income in the province of Sulcis Iglesiente, equal to 19,600€.

== Gallery ==
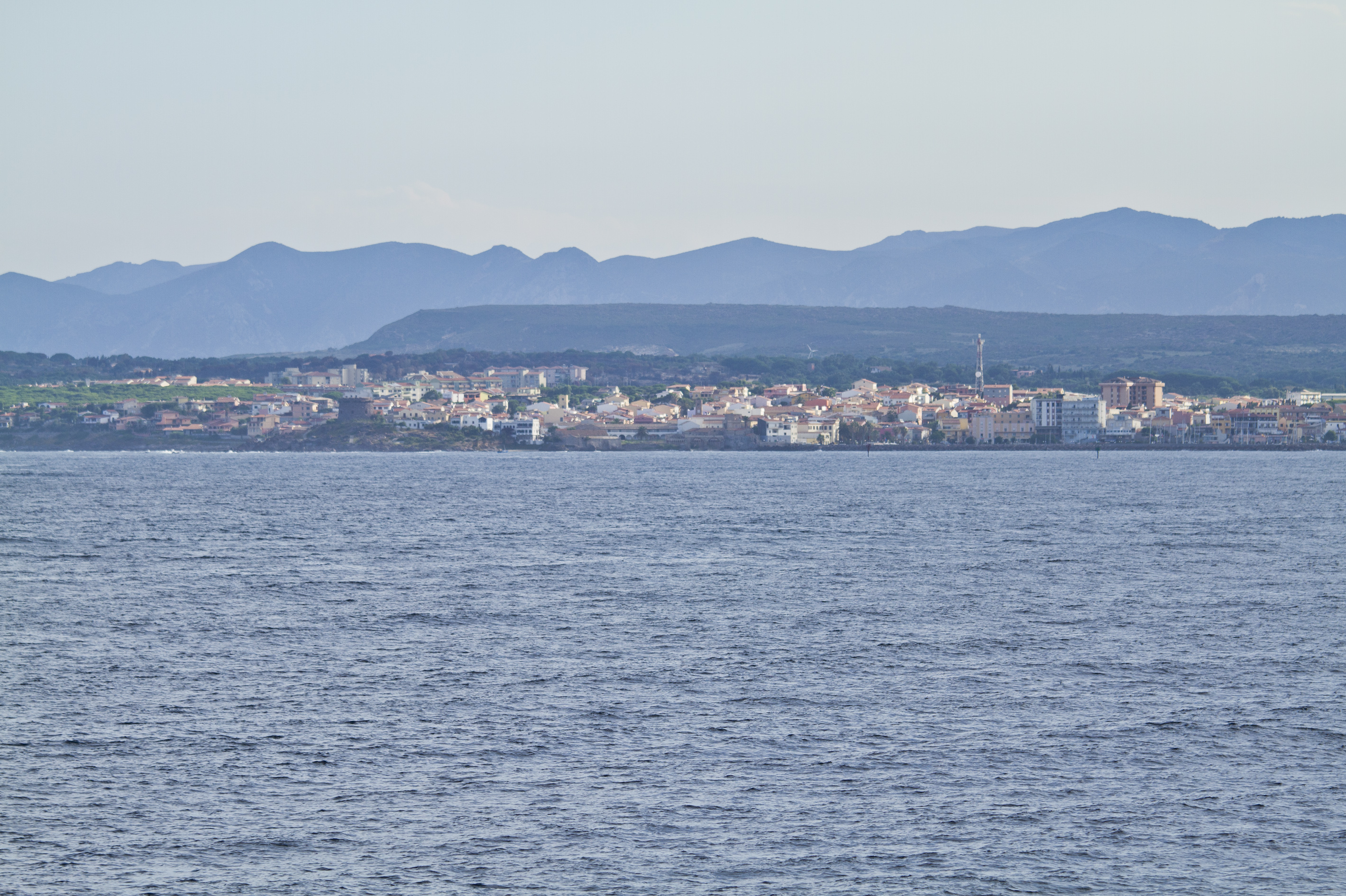
View from the sea

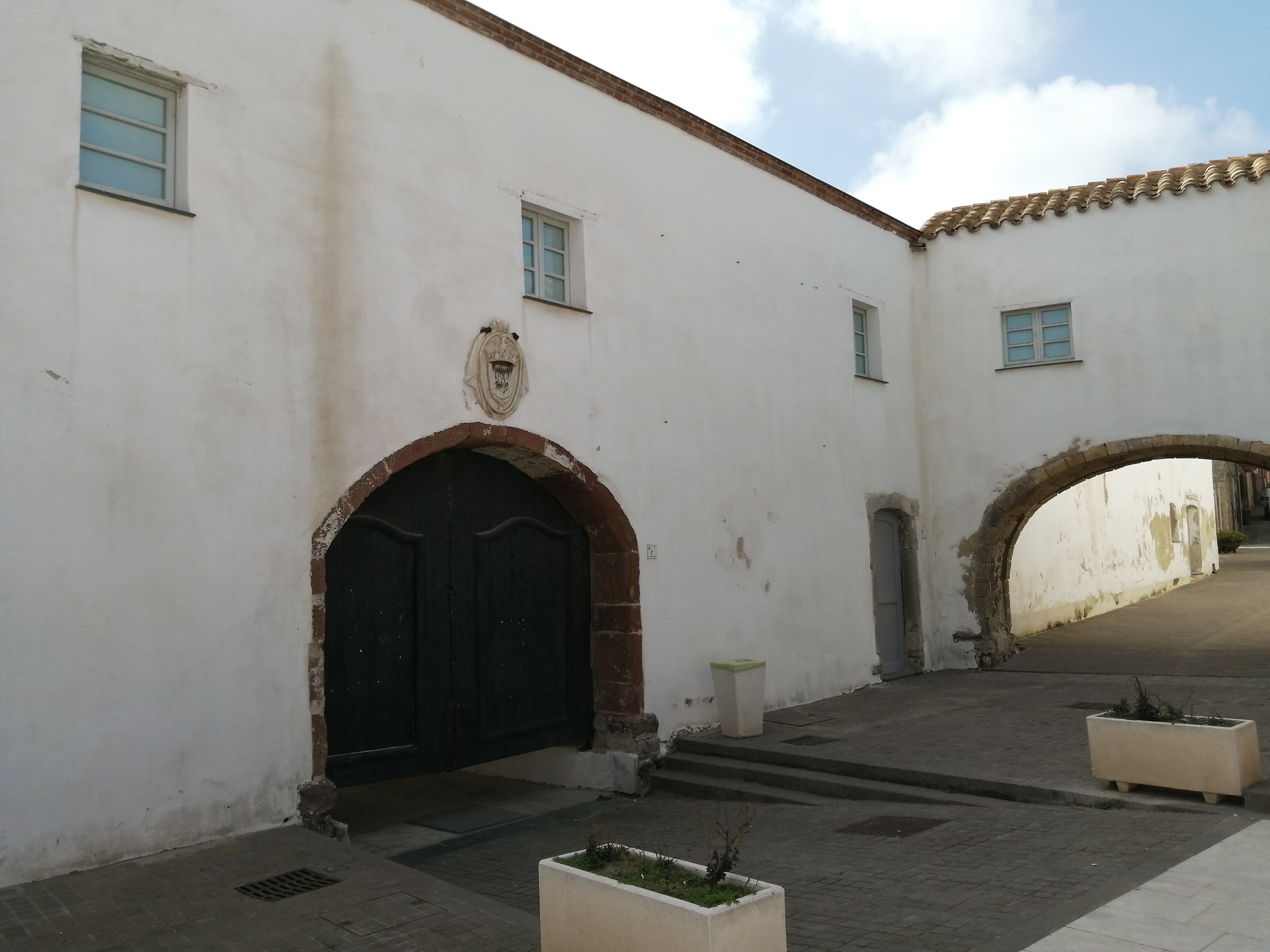
Su Pranu tuna fishery

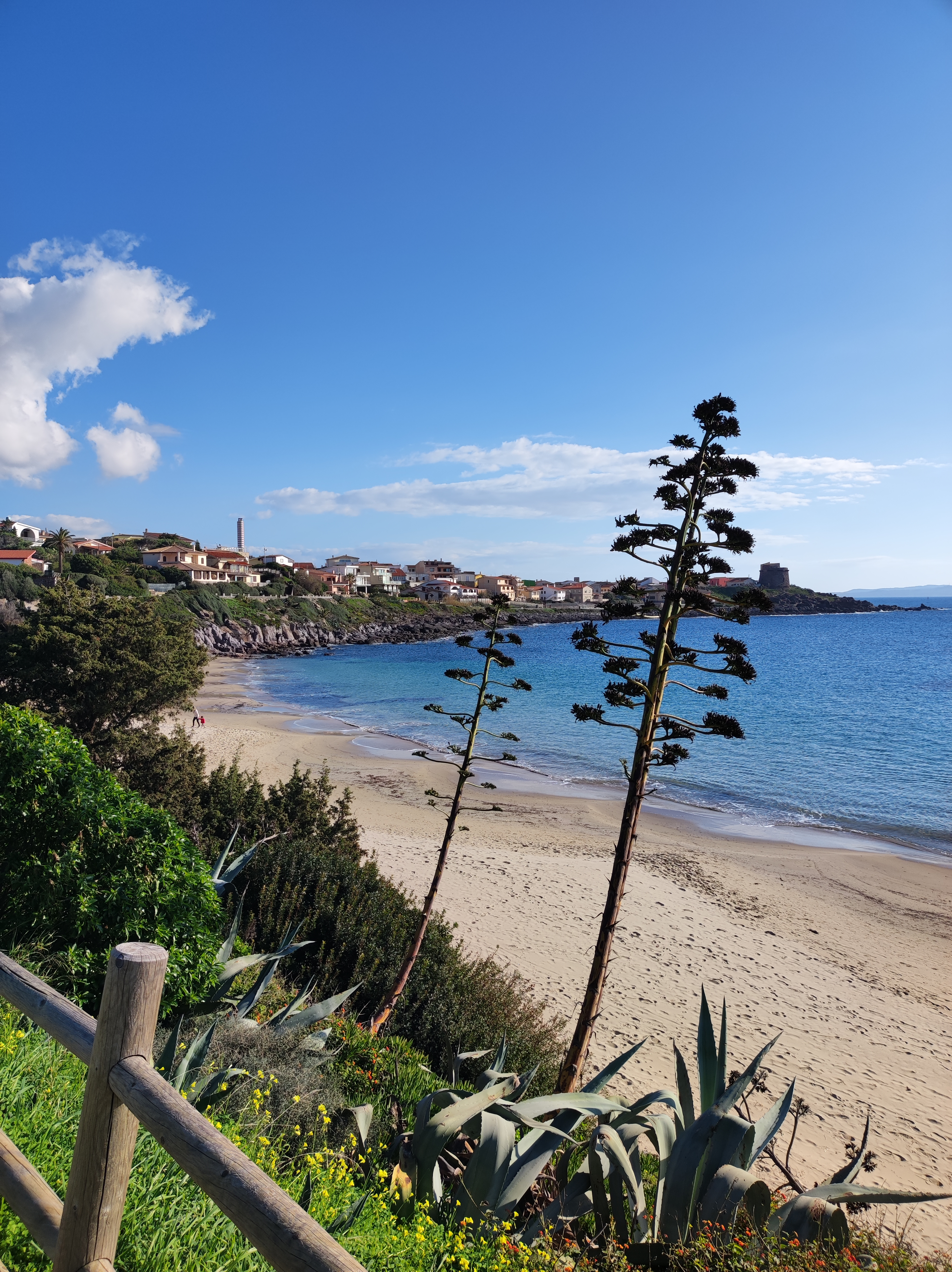
Portopaglietto

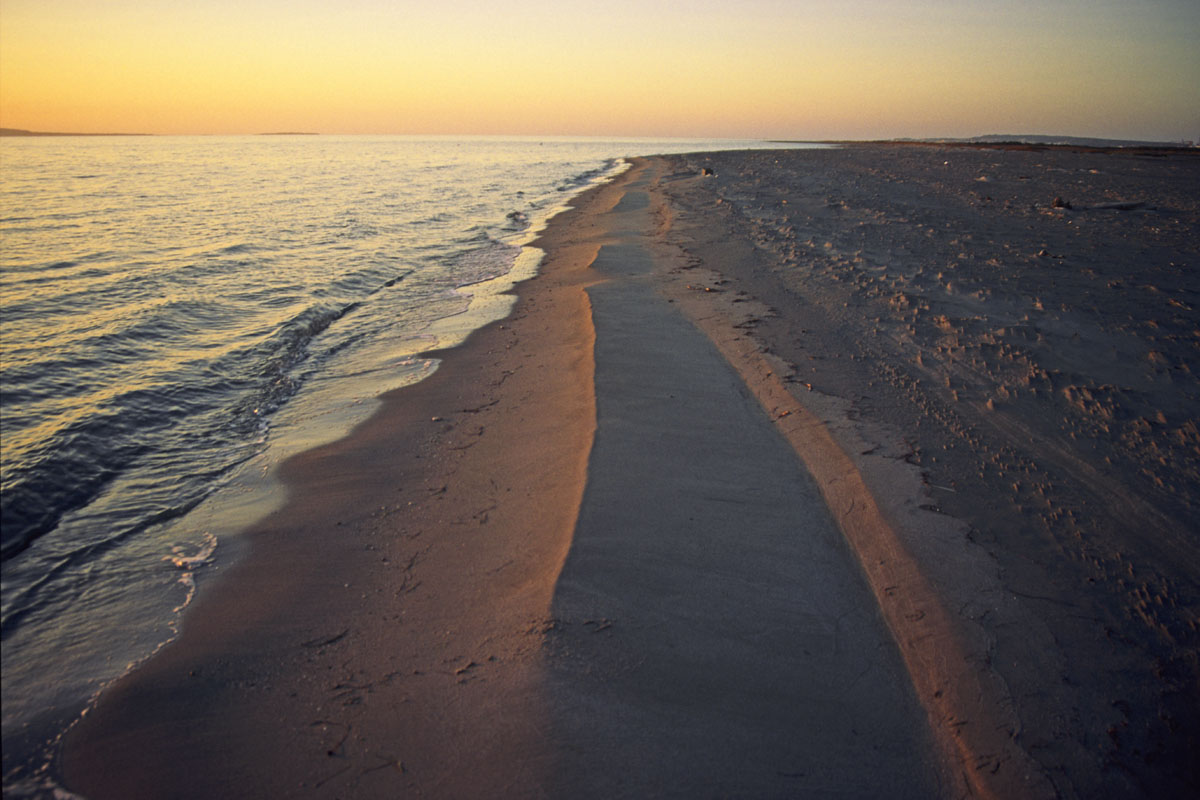
Punta S'Aliga

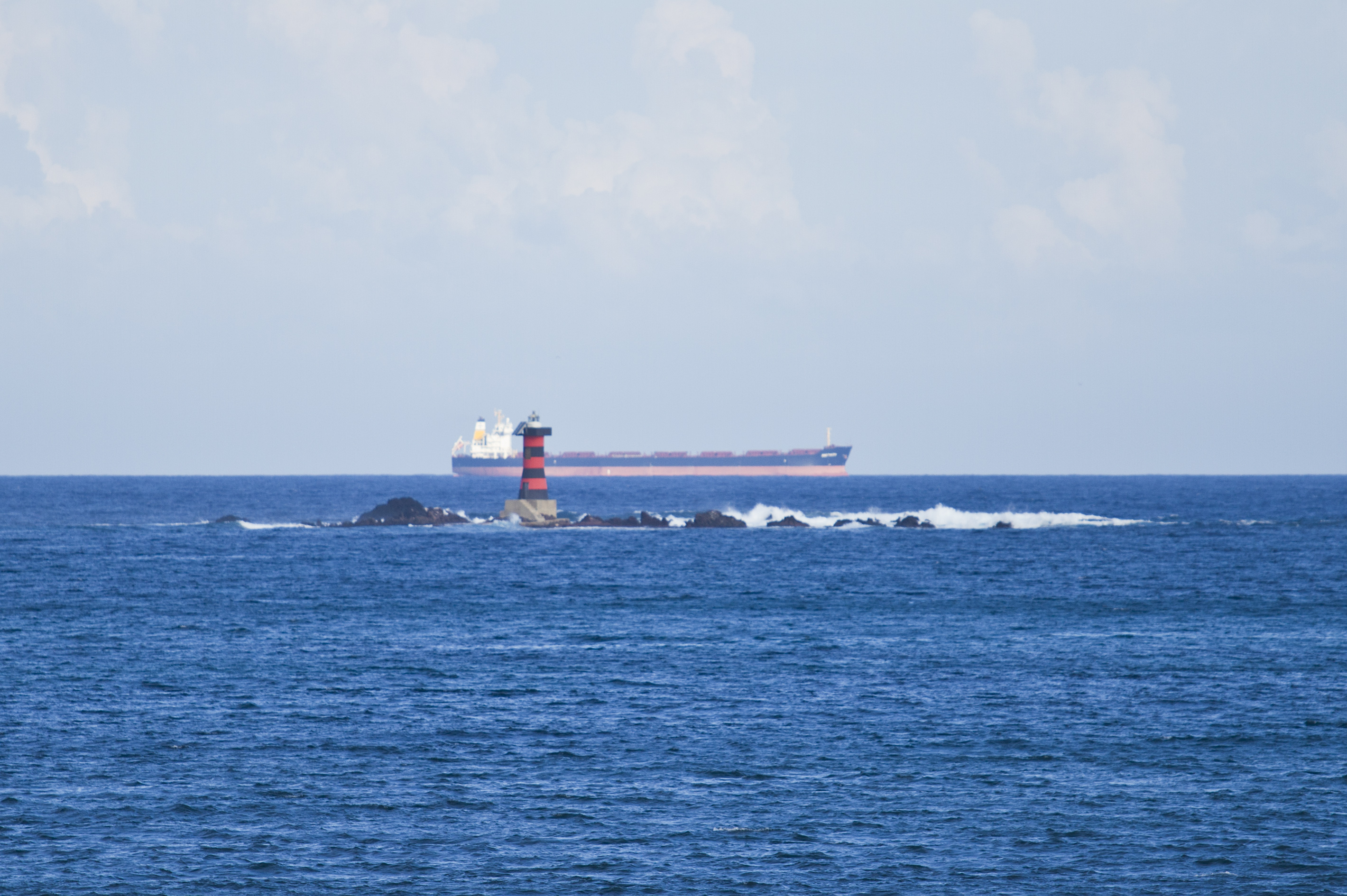
The lighthouse

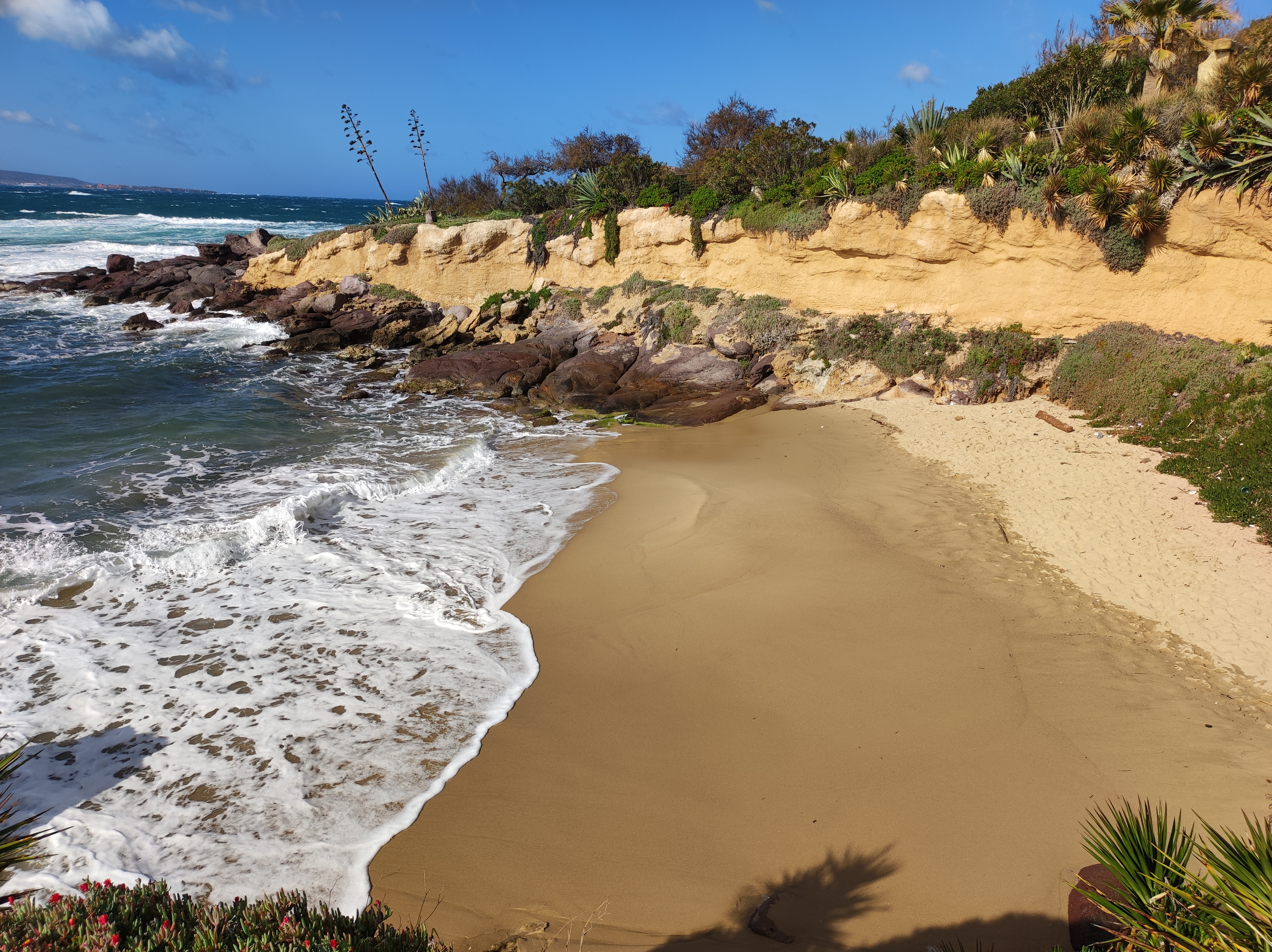
Sa Caletta

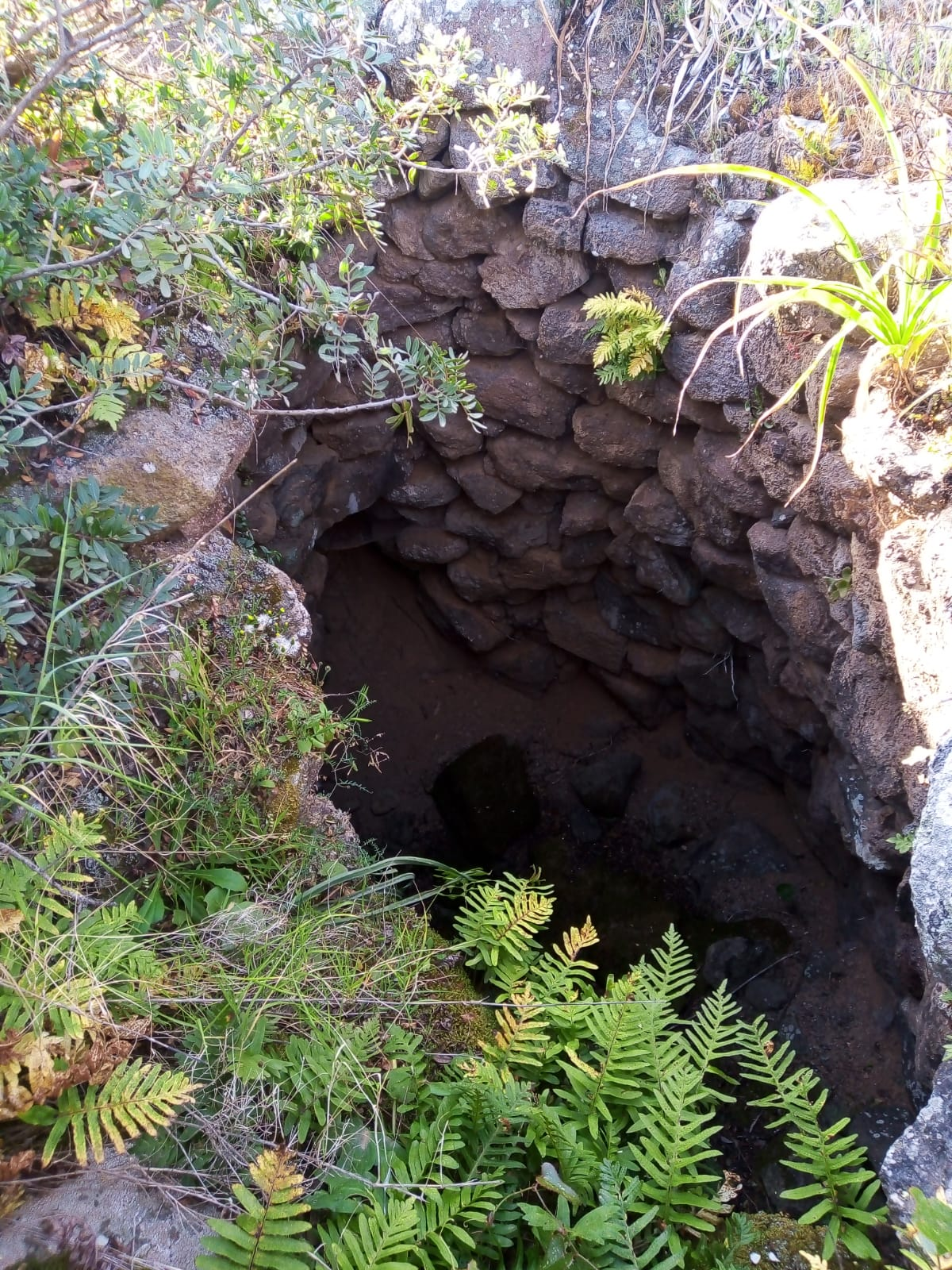
Nuraghe Ghillotta II

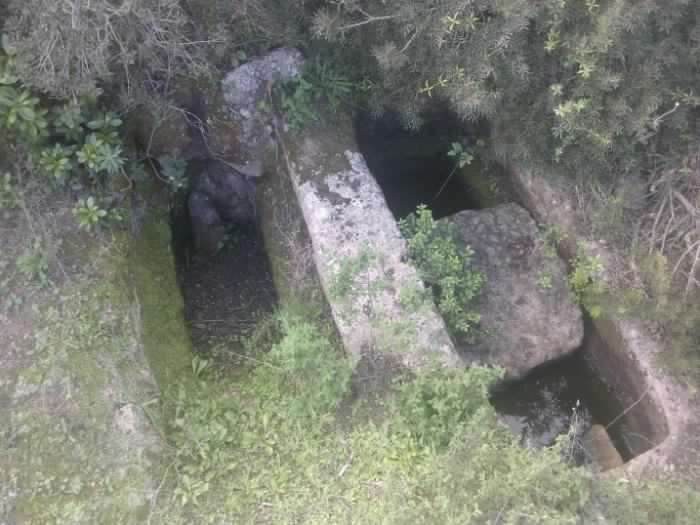
Roman tombs near Punta Maiorchina

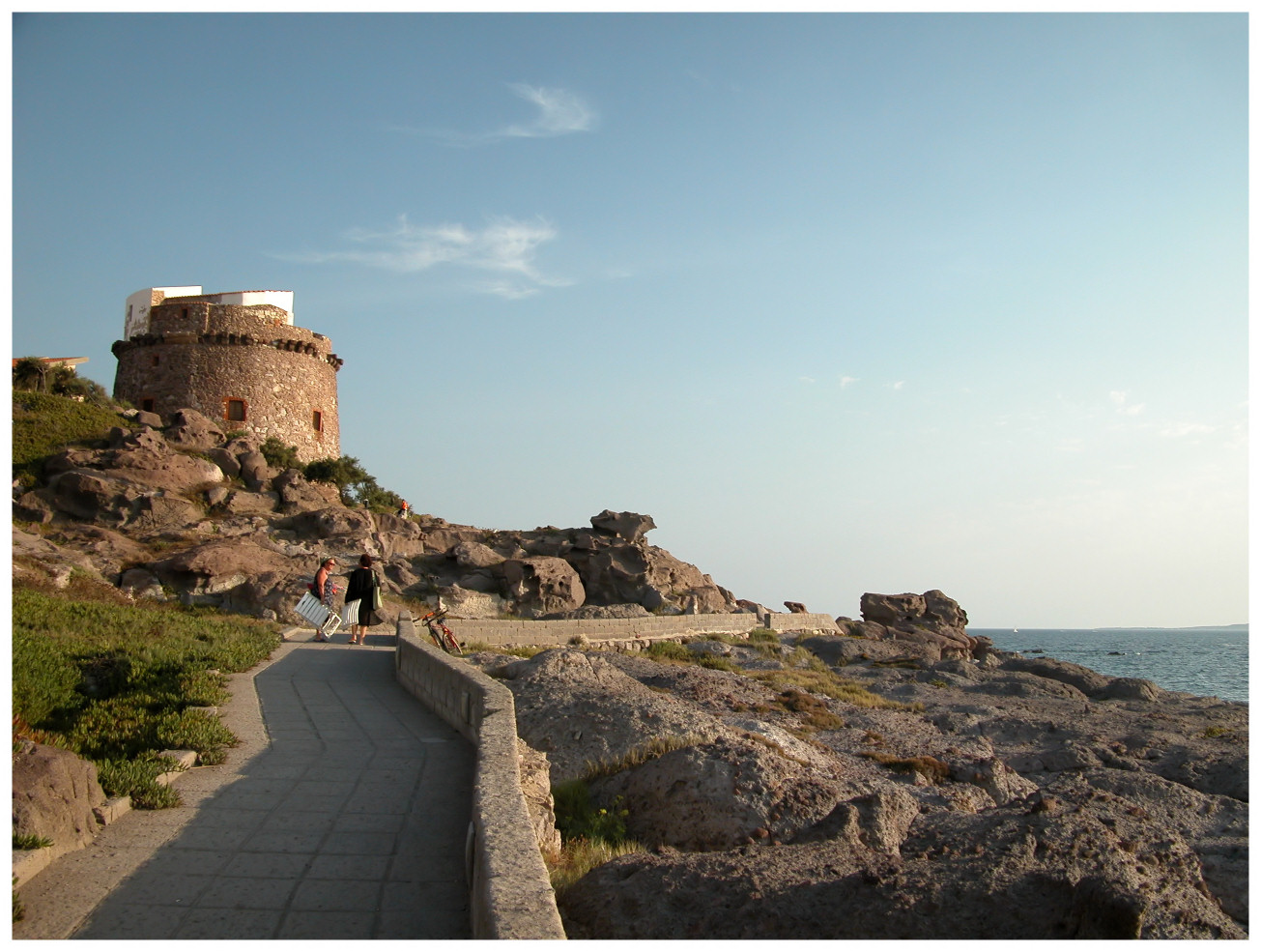
Torre spagnola (Spanish Tower)

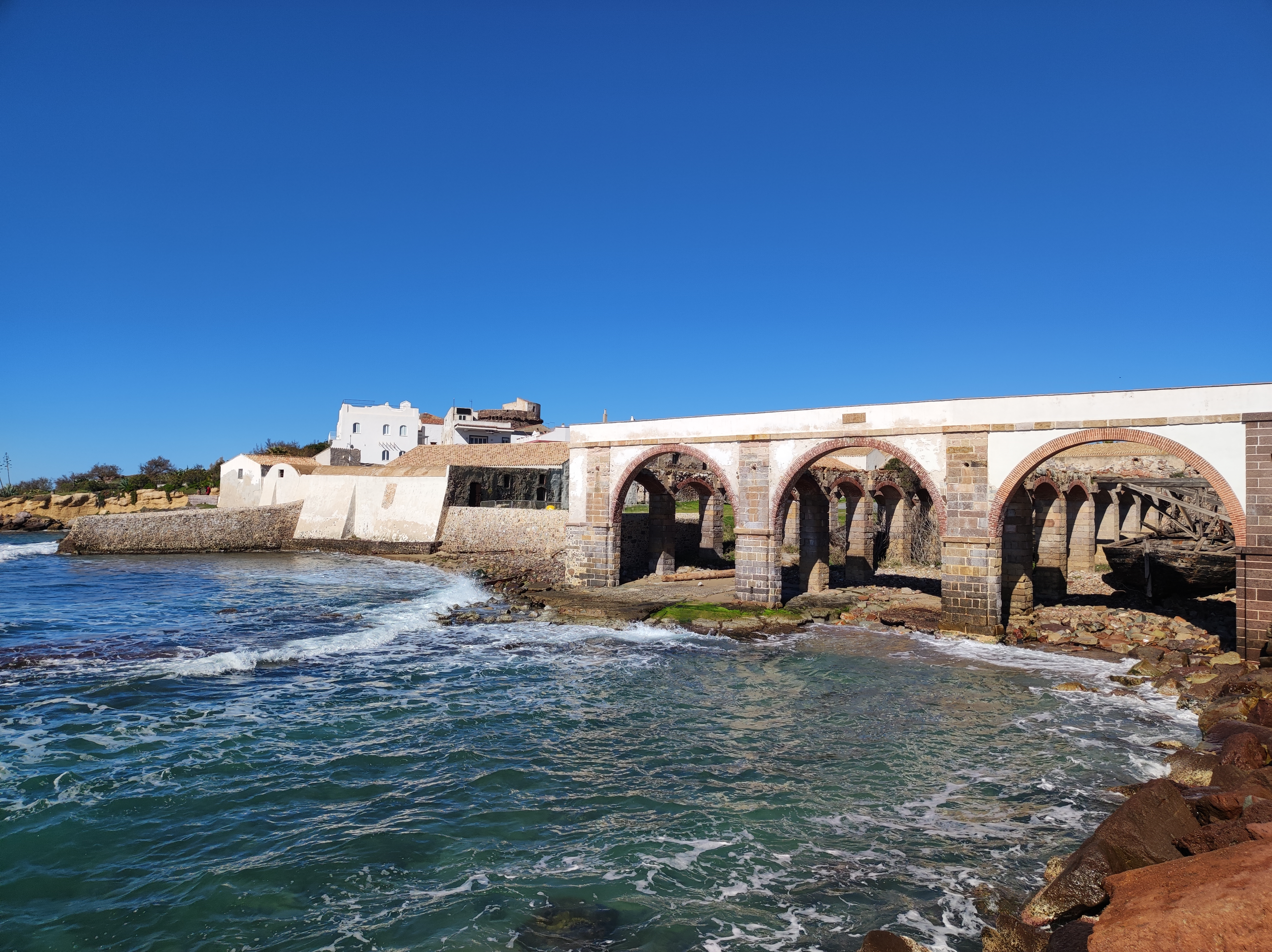
Su Pranu

== See also ==
- Portoscuso Wind Farm
