= Argentiera =

Coordinates: 40°44′24″N 8°9′4″E

- Frazione of Sassari
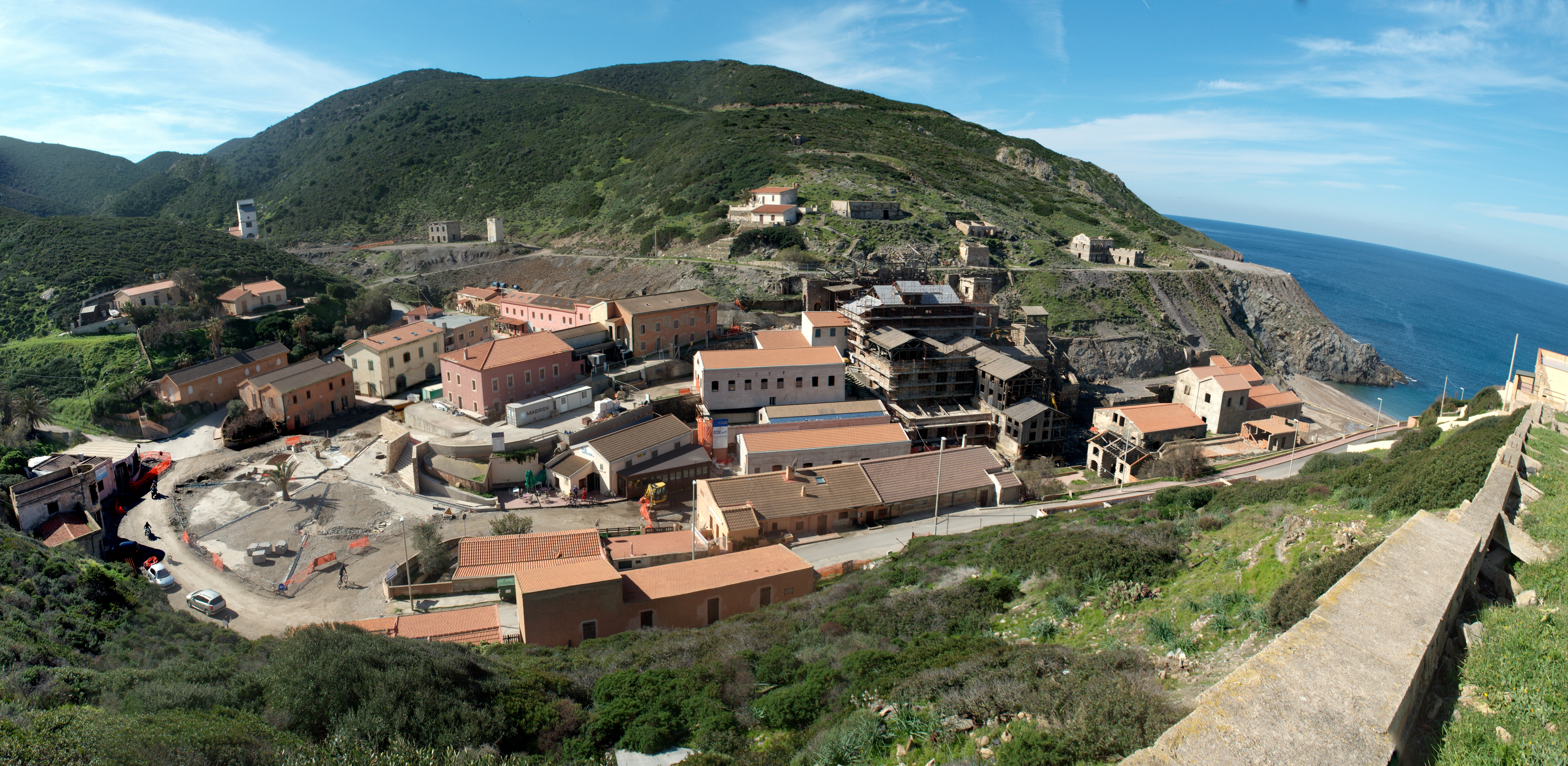
- Interactive map of Argentiera
- Country: Italy
- Region: Sardinia
- City: Sassari
- Elevation: 30 m (98 ft)

Population
  - Total: 70

Argentiera is a small town and a frazione (hamlet) in the comune of Sassari, in Sardinia, Italy. It is located 43 km west from Sassari, in a narrow valley, on the coast of the Sardinian Sea.

== History ==
Argentiera is a former mining town, its name comes from the Latin argento, meaning silver. The mine had been exploited since the ancient era, beginning with the Romans. It was reopened in the 19th century by "Società di Corr'e boi", a Belgian mining company. The French writer Honoré de Balzac, visited the village in 1838. The most florid period for the mining village was the 1940s. The town declined after World War II, and the mine was closed in 1963.

Today the town is the home of a few small businesses who get most of their income from tourism. It is one of the most important examples of industrial archaeology in Sardinia, it is included in the Geological-Mining Park of Sardinia and preserved by UNESCO. In recent years the town has experienced a small boom in building and renovation of the old buildings, notably the old mine.

== Gallery ==
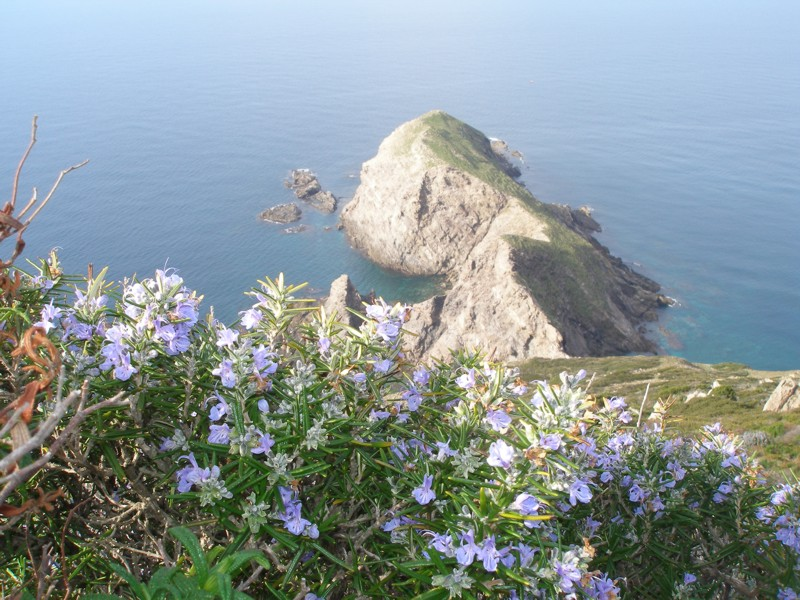
Cape Argentiera in North West Sardinia

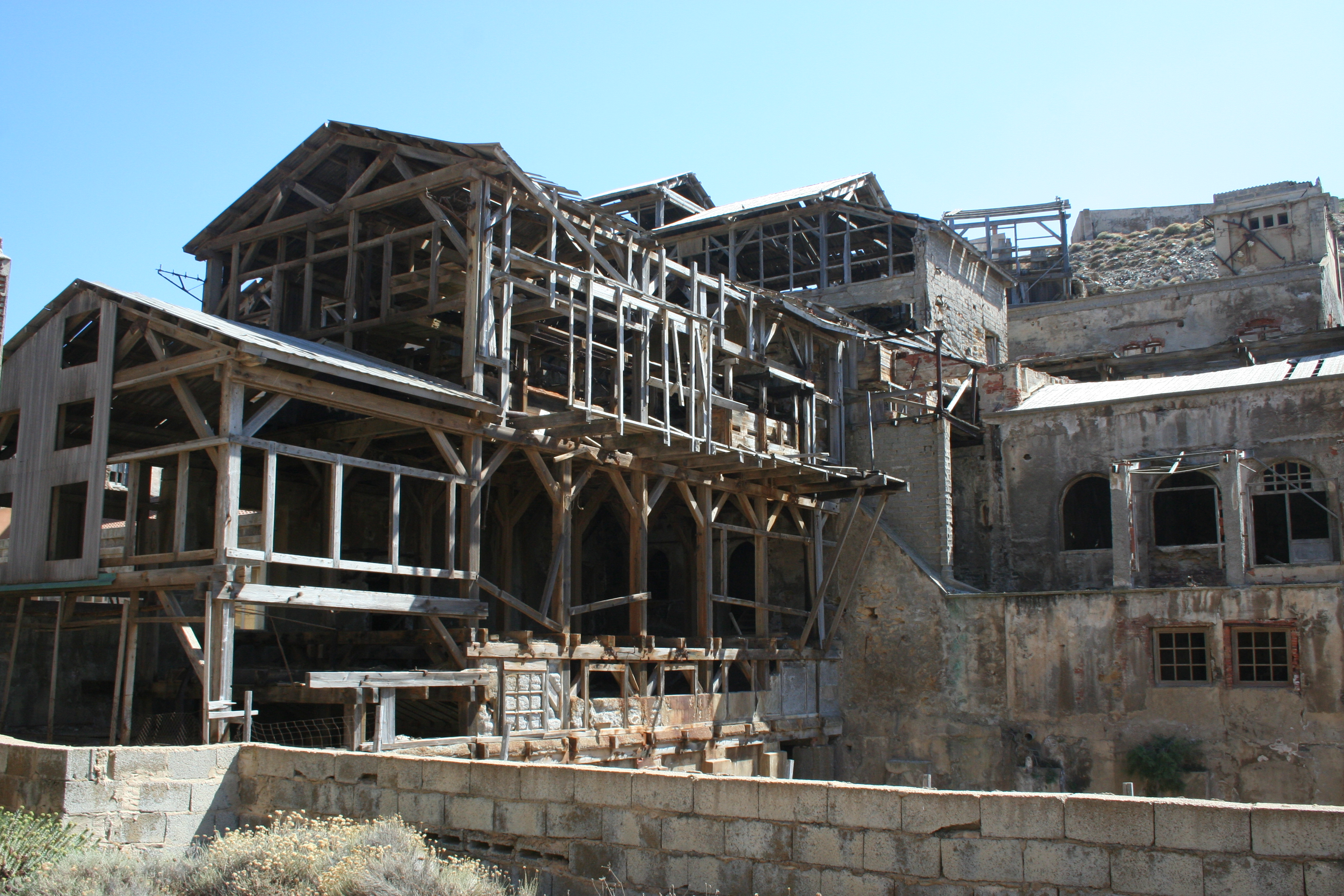
The Laveria

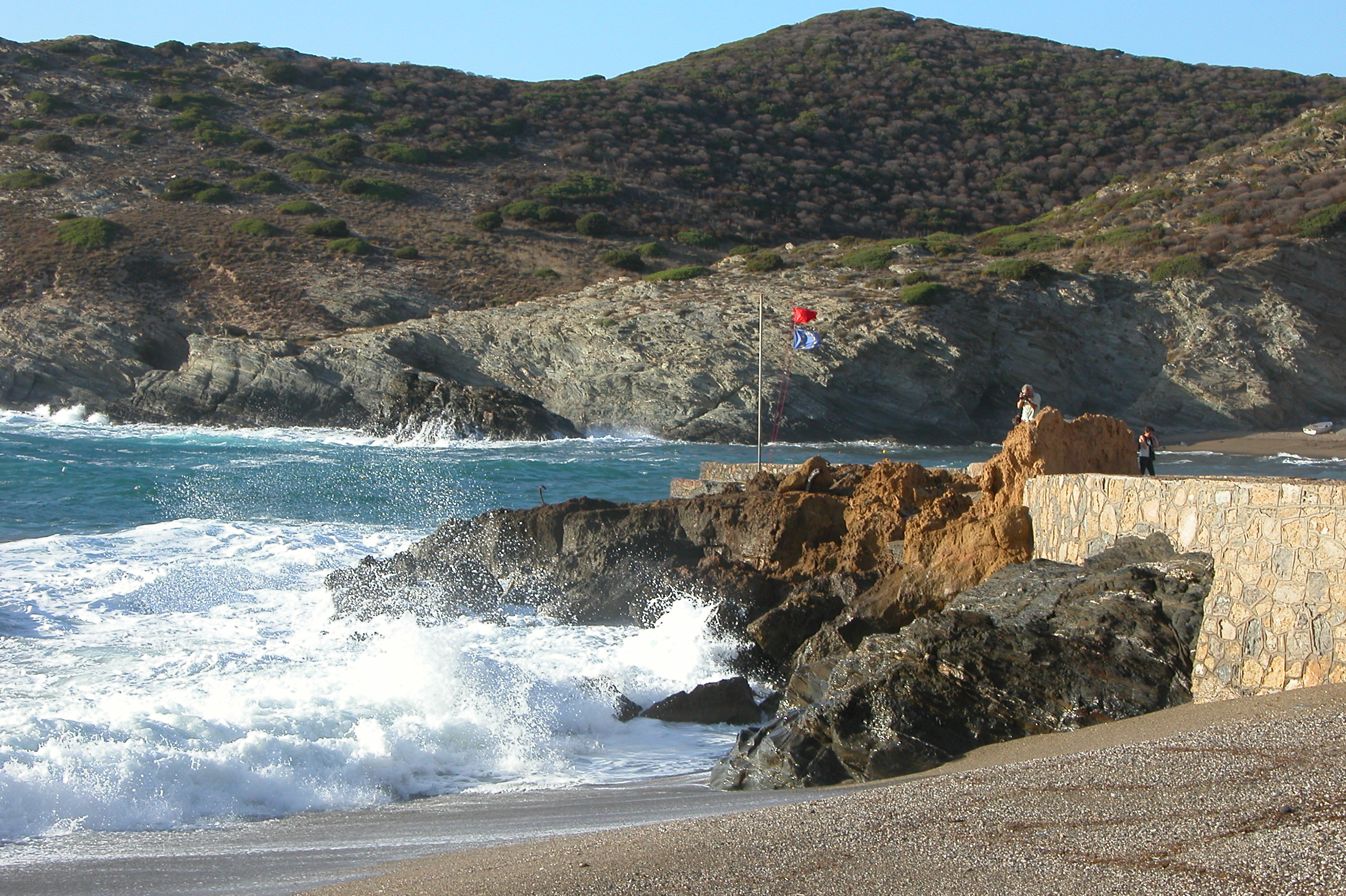
Argentiera's beach

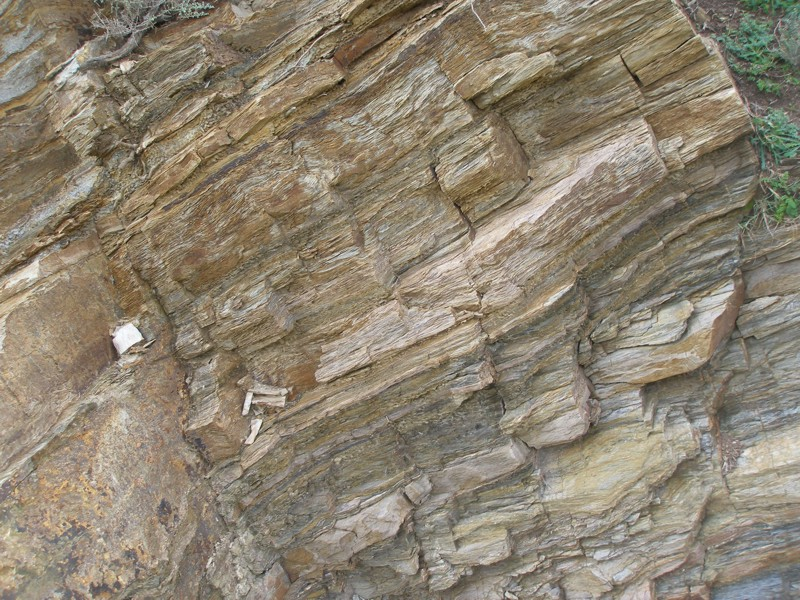
Typical sandwiched stone in Argentiera

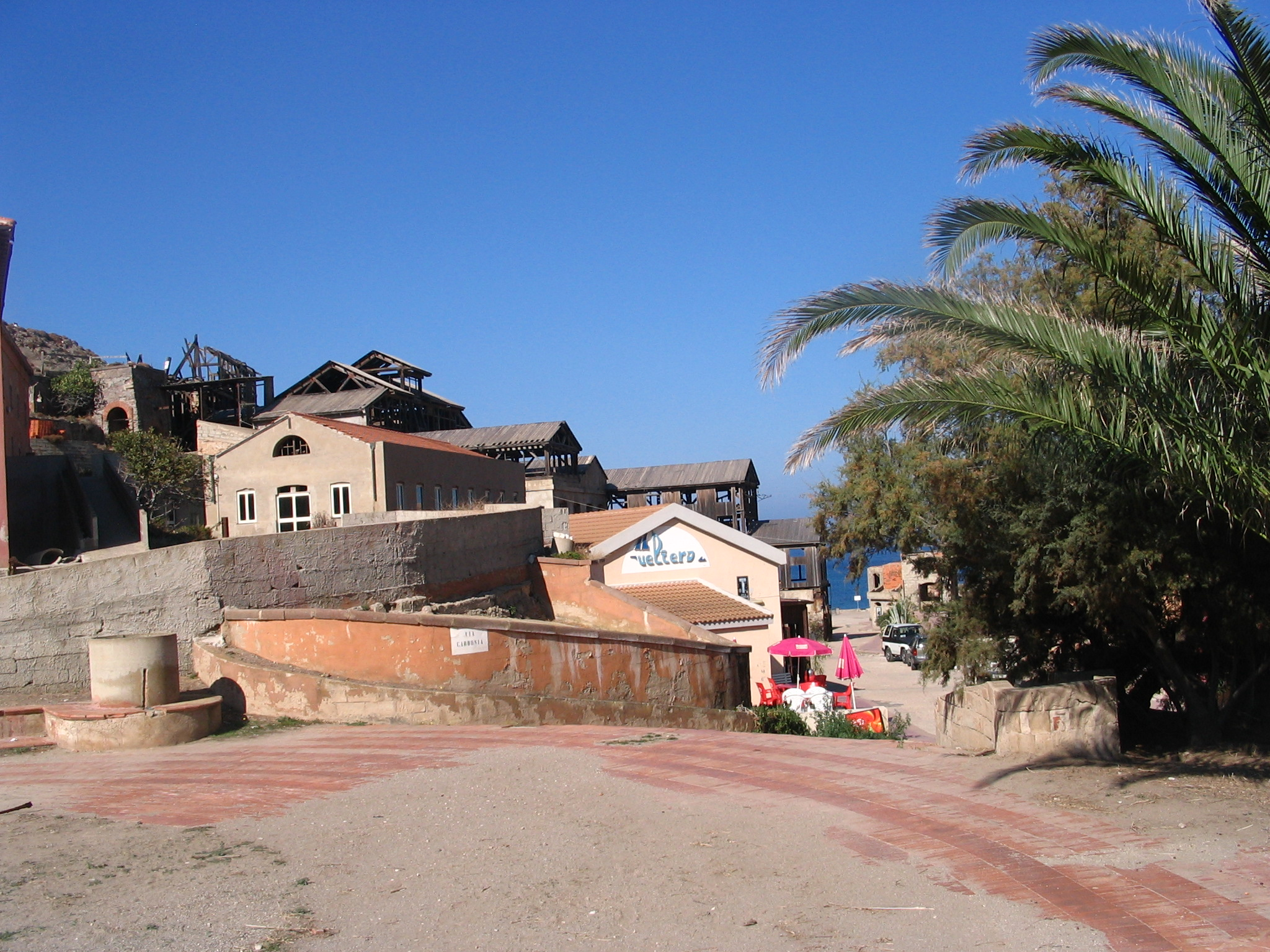
The village
