= Metalla =

Roman mining center

Metalla was a Roman mining center located in the Iglesiente region of Sardinia entrusted to a procurator metallorum where were destined Christians and slaves condemned to forced labor. Mentioned in ancient sources, it hosted a thermal building with mosaic floors and a public clock. Here passed the last stretch of the road form Tibulas Sulcis up to Sulci. In the sources would be recognized in Sardiparias, the Sartiparias of the Ravenna Cosmography and the Sardopatoris Forum of Ptolemy.

== Bibliography ==
- Mattia Sanna Montanelli, Εἰς μέταλλον Σαρδονίας. Metalla ed il Sulcis Iglesiente prima della pax costantiniana in XI Congresso Nazionale di Archeologia Cristiana - Isole e terraferma nel primo cristianesimo (Cagliari, Sant'Antioco 23-27 settembre 2014), Cagliari 2015.
- Attilio Mastino, Storia della Sardegna antica, Nuoro 2005.
- Gabriele Vargiu, Mario Cabriolu, Cercando Metalla. La geografia antica del Sulcis, Carbonia 2005.
