= Iglesiente =

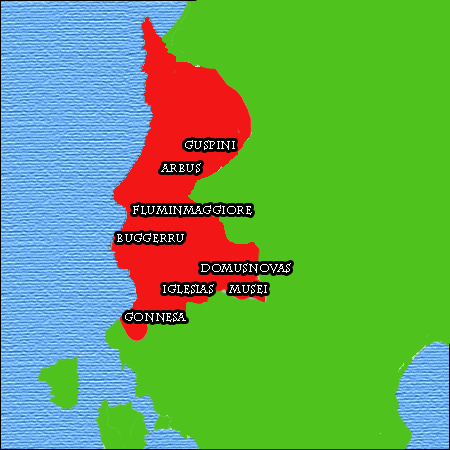
Iglesiente

The Iglesiente is a traditional and geographical subdivision of Sardinia, Italy. It encompasses the northern province of Carbonia-Iglesias and the south-western one of the province of Medio Campidano, and its main center is Iglesias.

Languages spoken include Italian and Sardinian (Campidanesu).

== History ==
Historically, it was inhabited since pre-Nuragic times. Later, it became an important metallurgic district for the Romans, who had here a town known as Metalla. From this period dates the construction of the Temple of Antas at Fluminimaggiore, dedicated to the cult of the Sardus Pater.

In the Middle Ages, the Pisans founded here the mining town of Villa di Chiesa (modern Iglesias), which soon became one the largest in the island. Later it was conquered by the Aragonese, who held it until 1720, when the house of Savoy acquired the Kingdom of Sardinia. During the 17th-18th century were refounded the villages of Musei, Gonnesa and Fluminimaggiore.

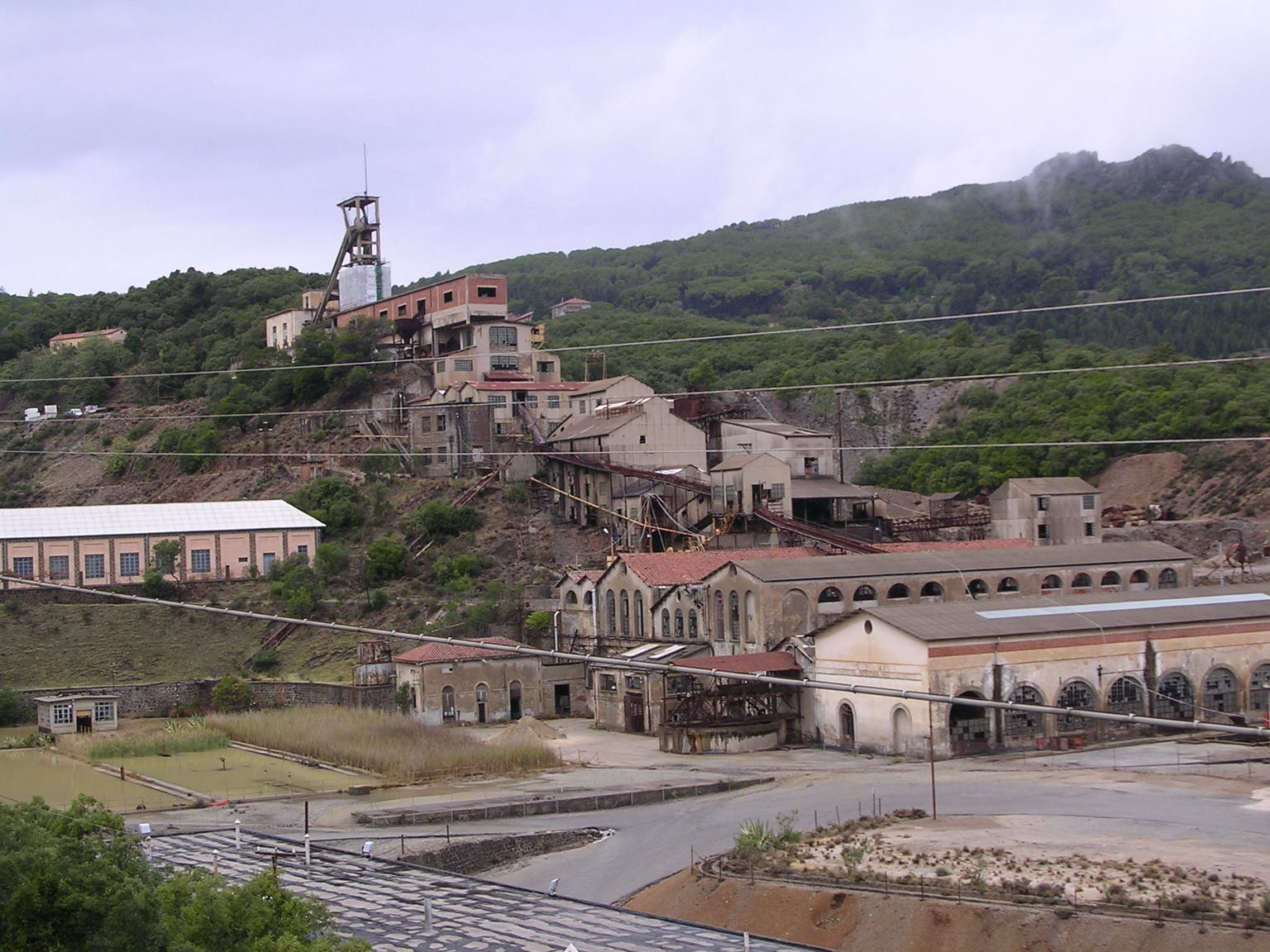
Montevecchio mines

From the mid-19th century the mining activity resumed at a rapid pace which led to the opening of the mines of Monteponi, Ingurtosu, Montevecchio and the mining villages of Buggerru, Nebida, San Benedetto and Gennas Serapis. Recently, the decline of the mining sector has caused a crisis of the local economy.

== See also ==
- Monte Linas
- Sulcis

== See also ==
- Sulcis-Iglesiente
