= Archipelago of Sulcis =

Archipelago of Sulcis: Arcipelago del Sulcis; Arcipelago del Sulcitano
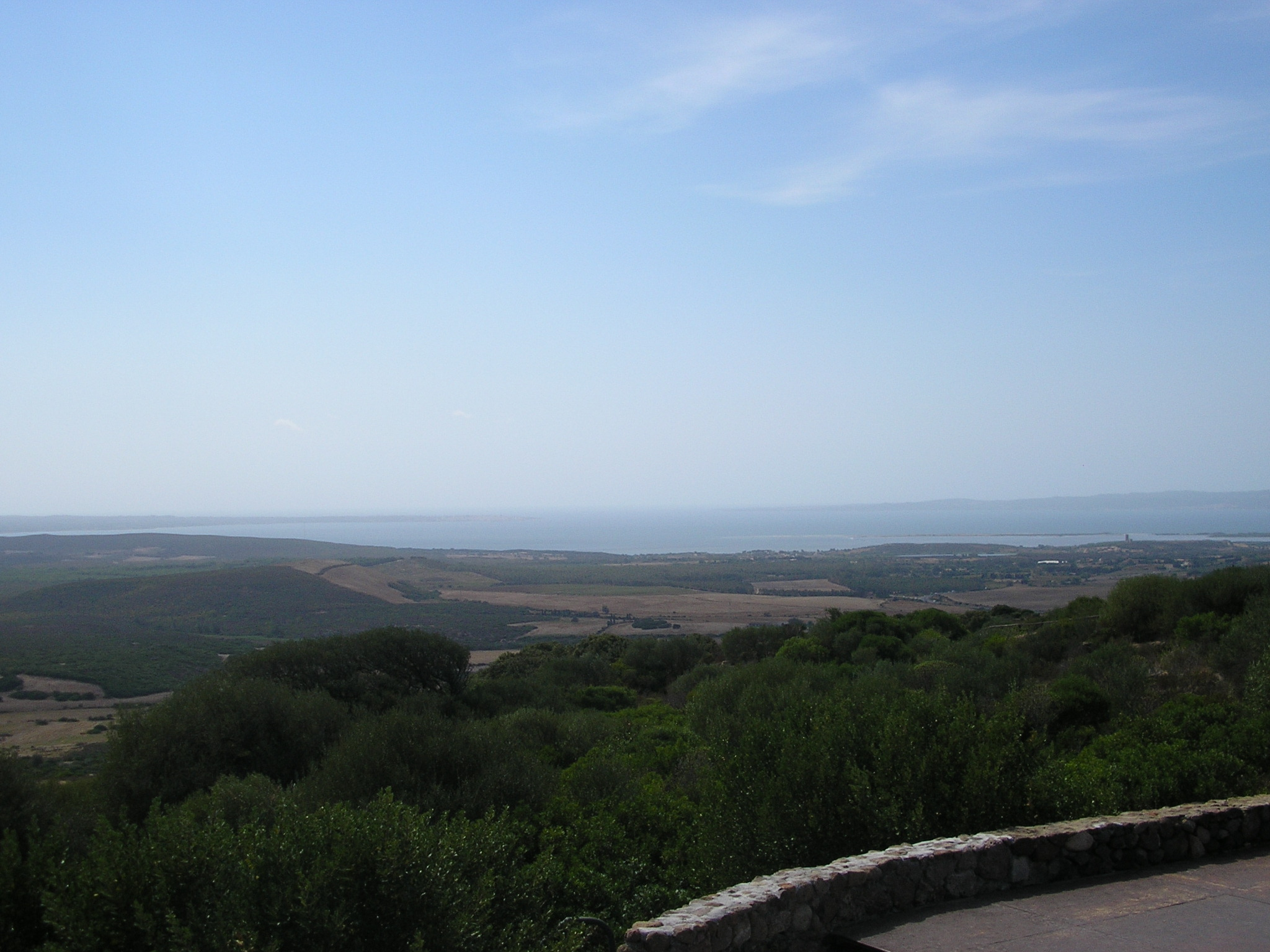
- The two principal islands of the Archipelago of Sulcis, viewed from Monte Sirai. Sant'Antioco is on the left, San Pietro Island on the right.
- Interactive map of Archipelago of Sulcis
- Coordinates: 39.0922°N 8.3263°E
- Country: Italy
- Province: South Sardinia

Area
  - Total: 160 km^{2} (62 sq mi)

Population (2022)
  - Total: 19,345
  - Density: 120/km^{2} (310/sq mi)

The Archipelago of Sulcis (in Italian Arcipelago del Sulcis or Sulcitano) is located off the coast of Sardinia, and is part of the disestablished Province of South Sardinia. The archipelago is 160 square kilometres (62 sq mi) in land area. The region had a resident population of 19,345 in 2022.

Many of the inhabitants are descended from the Ligurian inhabitants of a Genoese coral-fishing colony established in the 16th century on the Tunisian island of Tabarka. Following the capture of Tabarka in 1741 by the Bey of Tunis they fled the island and, with the permission of Charles Emmanuel III of Sardinia, settled the islands of Sulcis. The Tabarkan settlers established the towns of Carloforte on San Pietro Island and Calasetta on Sant'Antioco. The residents of these areas speak the Tabarchino dialect of the Ligurian language, which is recognized as a minority language by Sardinian regional legislation.

== Geography ==
Two principal islands, Sant'Antioco and San Pietro, respectively 108 square kilometres (42 sq mi) and 51 square kilometres (20 sq mi), make up the archipelago. It also contains several small islands: Isola Piana, Isola il Toro, Isola la Vacca, Isola del Corno and Isola dei Ratti. Of these only Isola Piana, 0.2 square kilometres (0.077 sq mi), is inhabited.
