= Trofie =

Type of pasta from Liguria and Sardinia

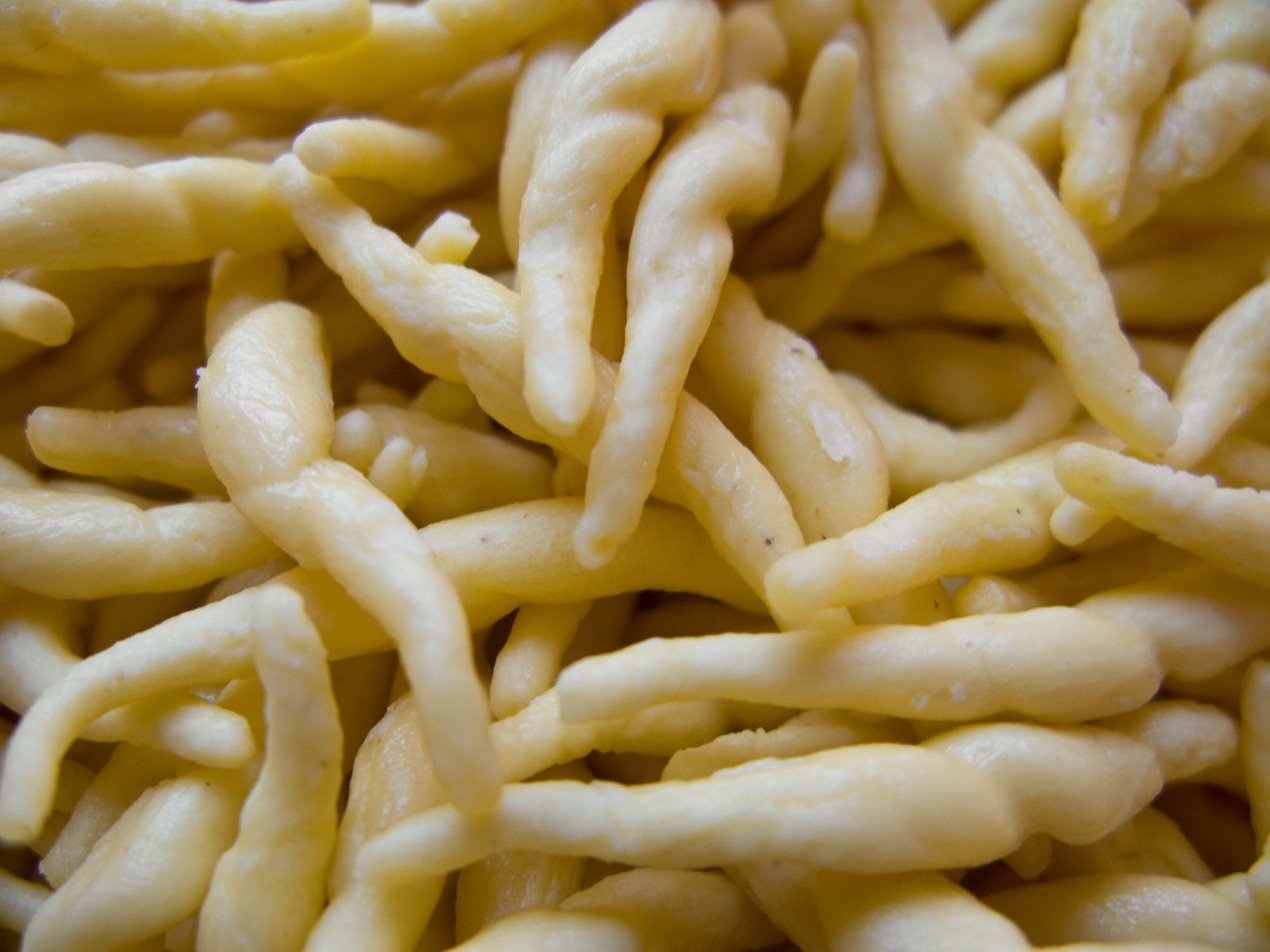
- Alternative names: Troffie, strofie, stroffie
- Type: Pasta
- Place of origin: Italy
- Region or state: Liguria, Sardegna
- Main ingredients: Durum wheat flour, water
- Similar dishes: Trofiette

Trofie (Italian: [ˈtrɔːfje]), less frequently troffie, strofie or stroffie, is a short, thin, twisted pasta from the Liguria region of Italy.

These thin, twisted shapes are believed to have originated in Sori, a town in the province of Genoa. In the Ligurian language, the term trofie refers to gnocchi, while trofietta means a "small gnocco"—a pasta made from flour and potatoes, quite different in both shape and texture.

Trofiette from Carloforte are also typical of the Sulcis archipelago in Sardinia, a region influenced by the Genoese culinary tradition known as cucina tabarchina (Tabarchino cuisine).

The pasta's distinct shape resembles wood shavings, traditionally referred to as risso da banché (lit. 'bench rice'). The twisted spiral form, with its central curl and tapered ends—known locally as intursoeia—is not just visually unique but also key to its culinary qualities. The compact size and curled design are essential to its texture and flavor profile. Its appearance is often compared to the spiral of a corkscrew.

In 2019, Trofie di Sori received the De.Co. (Denominazione Comunale) designation, recognizing it as a product deeply tied to its local territory and community. This status aims to preserve not only the traditional production methods but also the historical and cultural significance of this distinctive pasta shape.

== Etymology ==
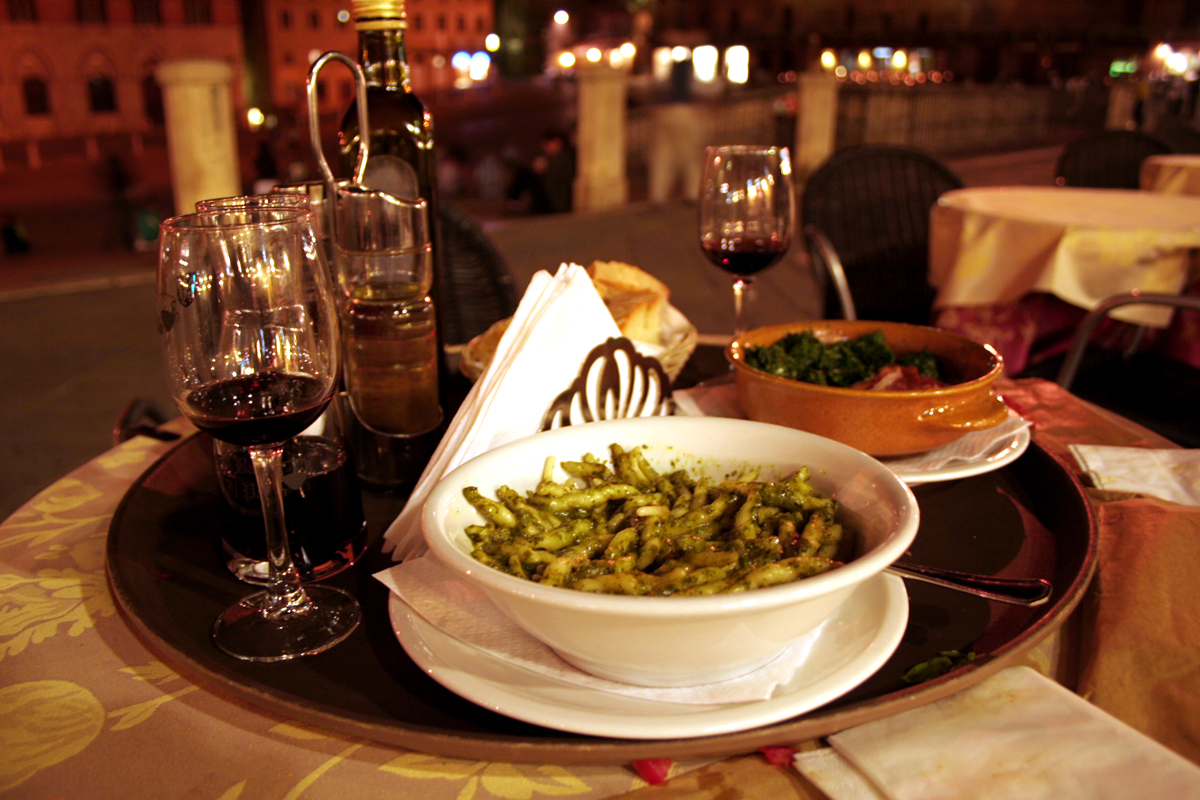
Trofie with pesto alla genovese

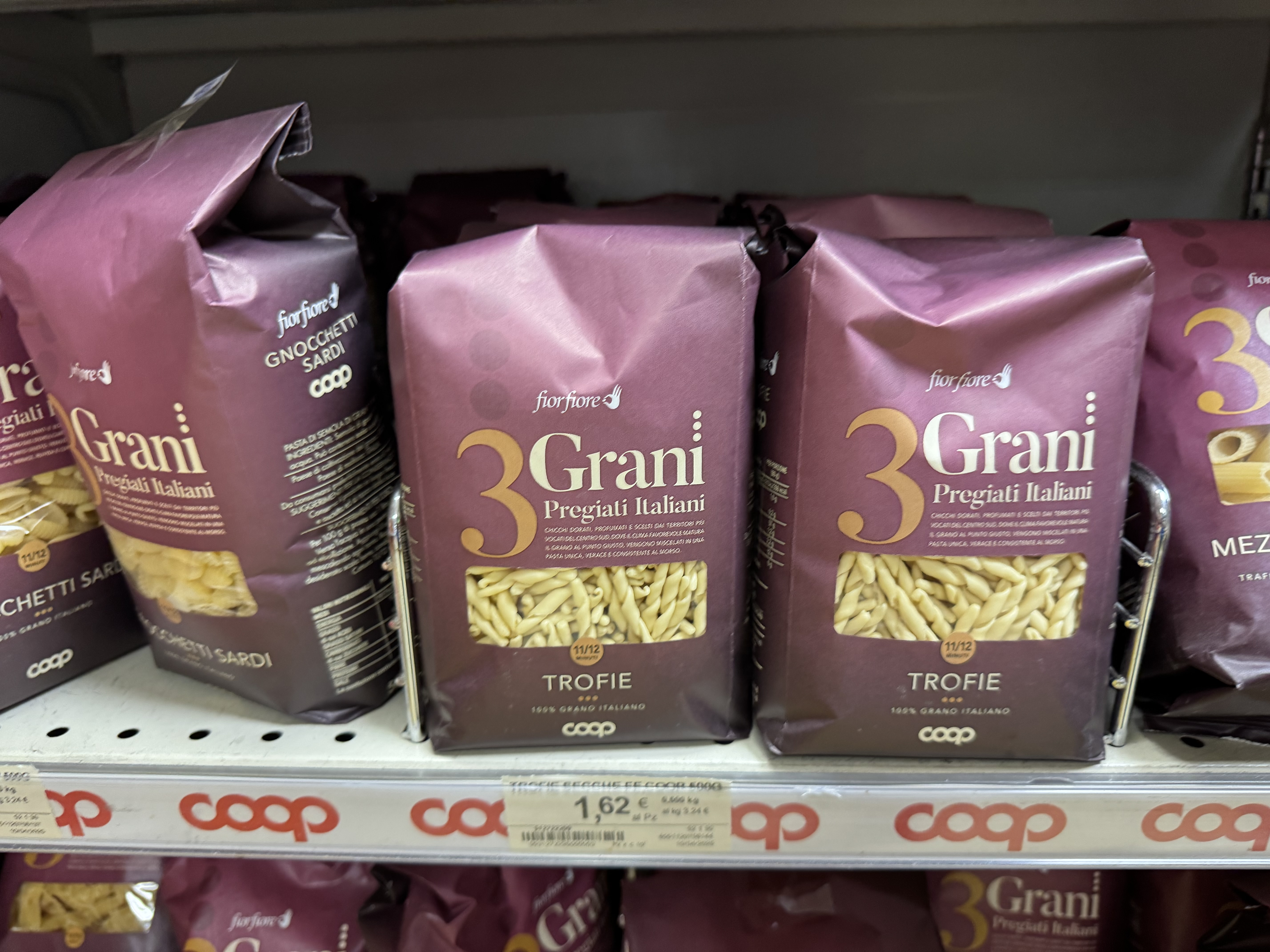
Trofie pasta on a store shelf in Santa Margherita Ligure, Italy

The origin of this pasta's name is not certain. Perhaps it comes from the Ligurian verb strufuggiâ, meaning 'to rub', as a reference to its method of preparation, which consists in "rubbing" or rolling a small piece of dough on the pastry board. Similarly, the root of Ligurian strofia might be Ancient Greek στρωφάω (stropháo, 'to twist, to spin'), or στρέφω, (strépho, 'to cause to rotate, to twist, to plait'), (Note: These verbs have been rather prolific in Italian language, as they have produced a number of nouns such as strofa (stanza), strofio (i.e. a classical woman's bustband or also a man's headband), apostrofo (lit. 'apostrophe'), catastrofe (lit. 'catastrophe'), etc.) referring to the same motion required to produce trofie.

== Description ==
Trofie are shaped by rolling a small piece of dough on a flat surface to form a short, round length of pasta with tapered ends, then twisting it to form the final shape. It is around 2–3 cm (3/4–1 1/4 in) long with a diameter of roughly 4 mm (3/16 in).

In Ligurian cuisine, it is most typically served with a pesto sauce.

== History ==
Modern trofie seems to originate from Golfo Paradiso, a strip of land in the Riviera di Levante including maritime towns like Recco, Sori, Camogli and other comuni (municipalities) in the area. This pasta shape was not so common in Genoa until the mid-20th century, though the term trofie was already in use there and referred to gnocchi as a whole. Genovese trofie was traditionally made with either wheat or chestnut flour and, from the beginning of the 19th century, with the addition of potatoes also.

Today, trofie is a staple of modern Ligurian cuisine. It is also made in a small version called trofiette in Italy.

== See also ==
Media related to Trofie at Wikimedia Commons

- Cuisine of Liguria
- List of pasta
