= Sulcis =

Geographic region of Sardinia

Coordinates: 39.1000°N 8.7167°E

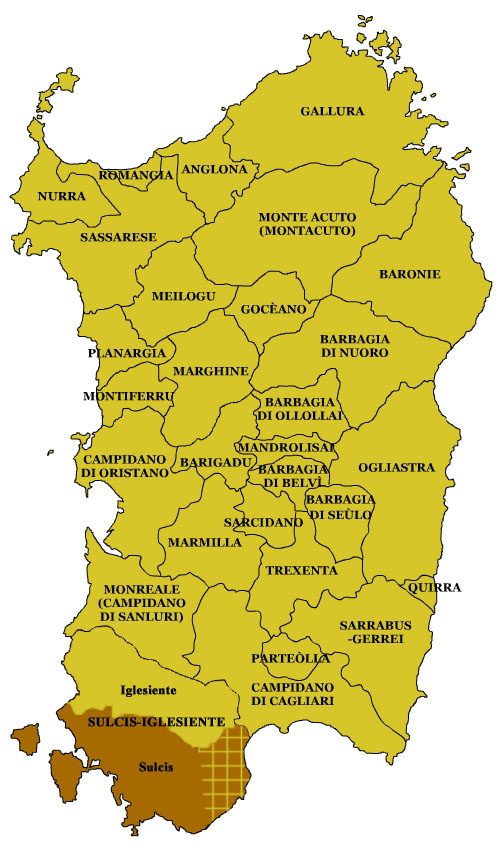
Sulcis in Sardinia

Sulcis (Maurreddia or Meurreddia in Sardinian language) is a subregion of Sardinia, Italy, in the Province of South Sardinia.

Languages spoken include Italian, Sardinian (Campidanesu) and Ligurian (Tabarchino).

== Geographical extension ==
Its municipalities are: Calasetta, Carbonia, Carloforte, Giba, Gonnesa, Masainas, Narcao, Nuxis, Perdaxius, Piscinas, Portoscuso, San Giovanni Suergiu, Santadi, Sant'Anna Arresi, Sant'Antioco, Tratalias, Villaperuccio, Teulada.

Part of the region are also the islands of San Pietro and Sant'Antioco.

Today the term "Lower Sulcis" is used to indicate the municipalities that belonged to the old Curatoria of Sulcis (without the Cixerri valley) and, sometimes, it is erroneously attributed to the towns of Pula, Villa San Pietro, Sarroch and Domus de Maria, which never belonged to the territory of ancient Sulci but rather to that of Nora, never belonged to the diocese of Sulci but always to that of Cagliari and, in the Middle Ages, belonged exclusively to the Curatoria of Nuras of the Giudicato of Cagliari.

== History ==
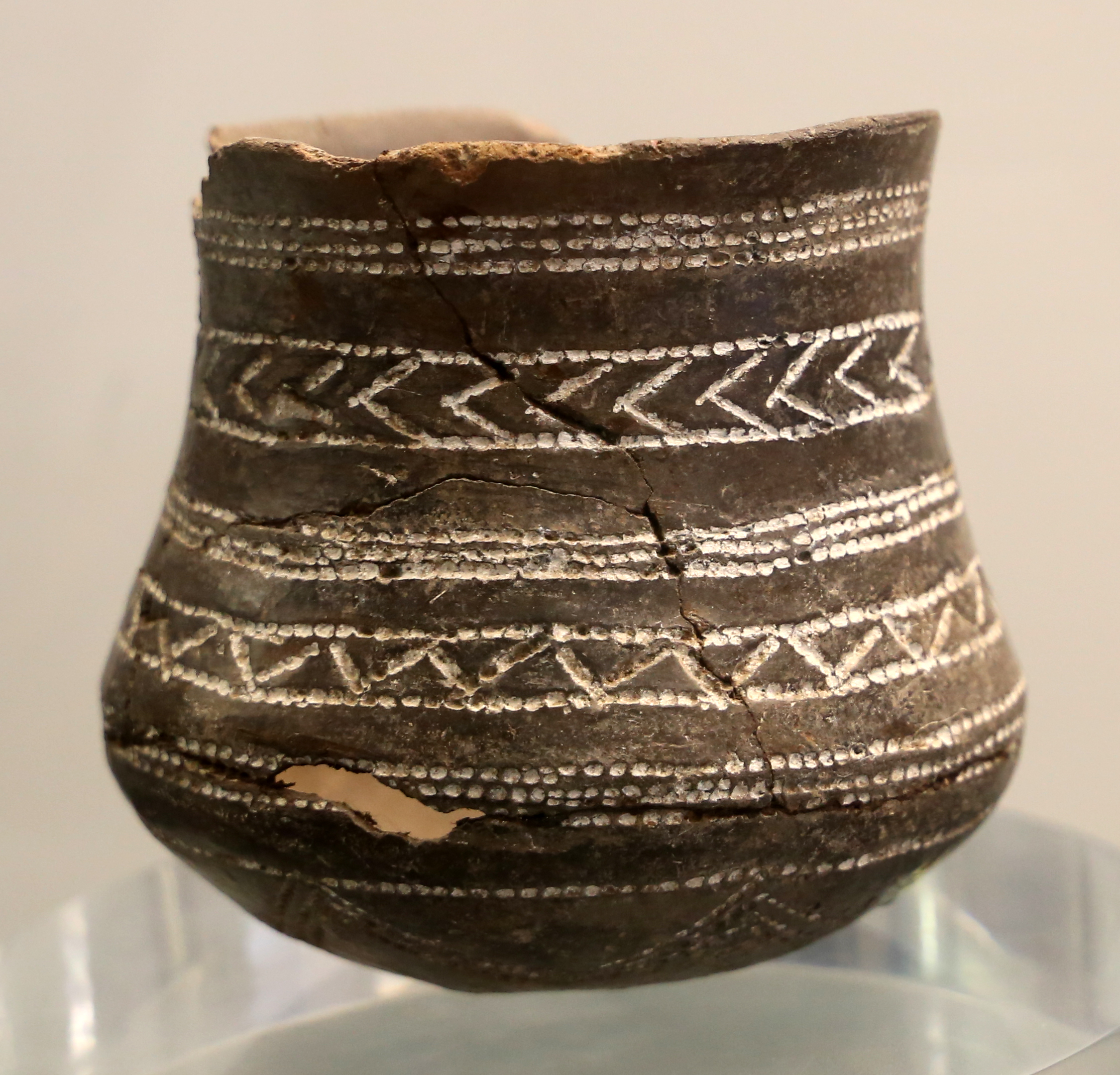
Bell Beaker from the necropolis of Is Loccis-Santus

The oldest traces of human presence in the Sulcis date back to the Mesolithic (9000 BC). From the second half of the fourth millennium BC, in the late Neolithic, the tombs took on the appearance of Domus de Janas, subterranean structures obtained by digging the rock sometimes gathered in vast necropolis as in the case of Montessu.

To the Eneolithic belong the cultures of Monte Claro and of the Bell Beaker which were widely spread in the Sulcis. In the early centuries of the second millennium BC in Sardinia developed the Bonnanaro culture, linked to the previous culture of the bell-shaped vessel to which were added Polada influences; Sulcis is one of the Sardinian territories in which this culture is most strongly represented.

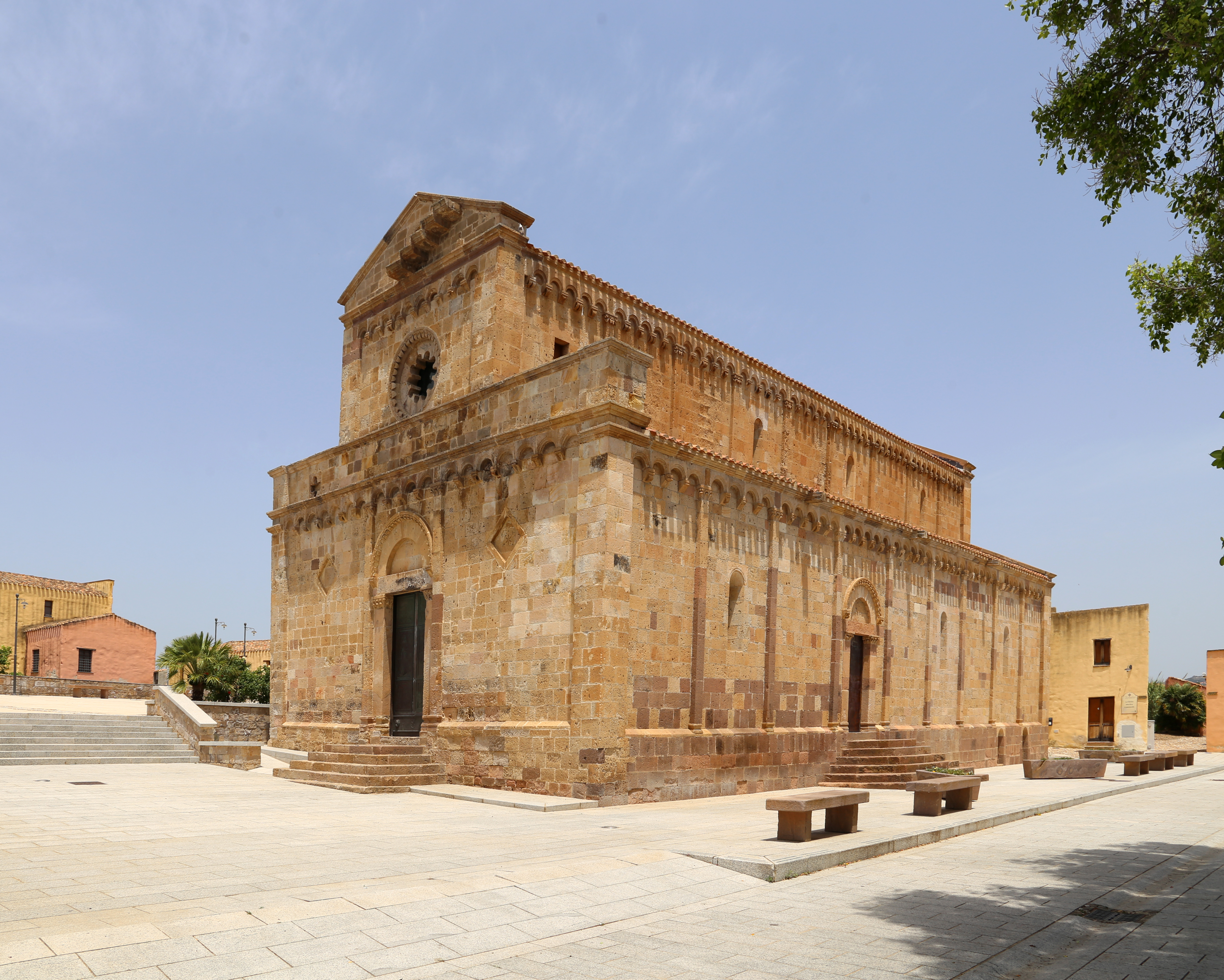
Tratalias cathedral

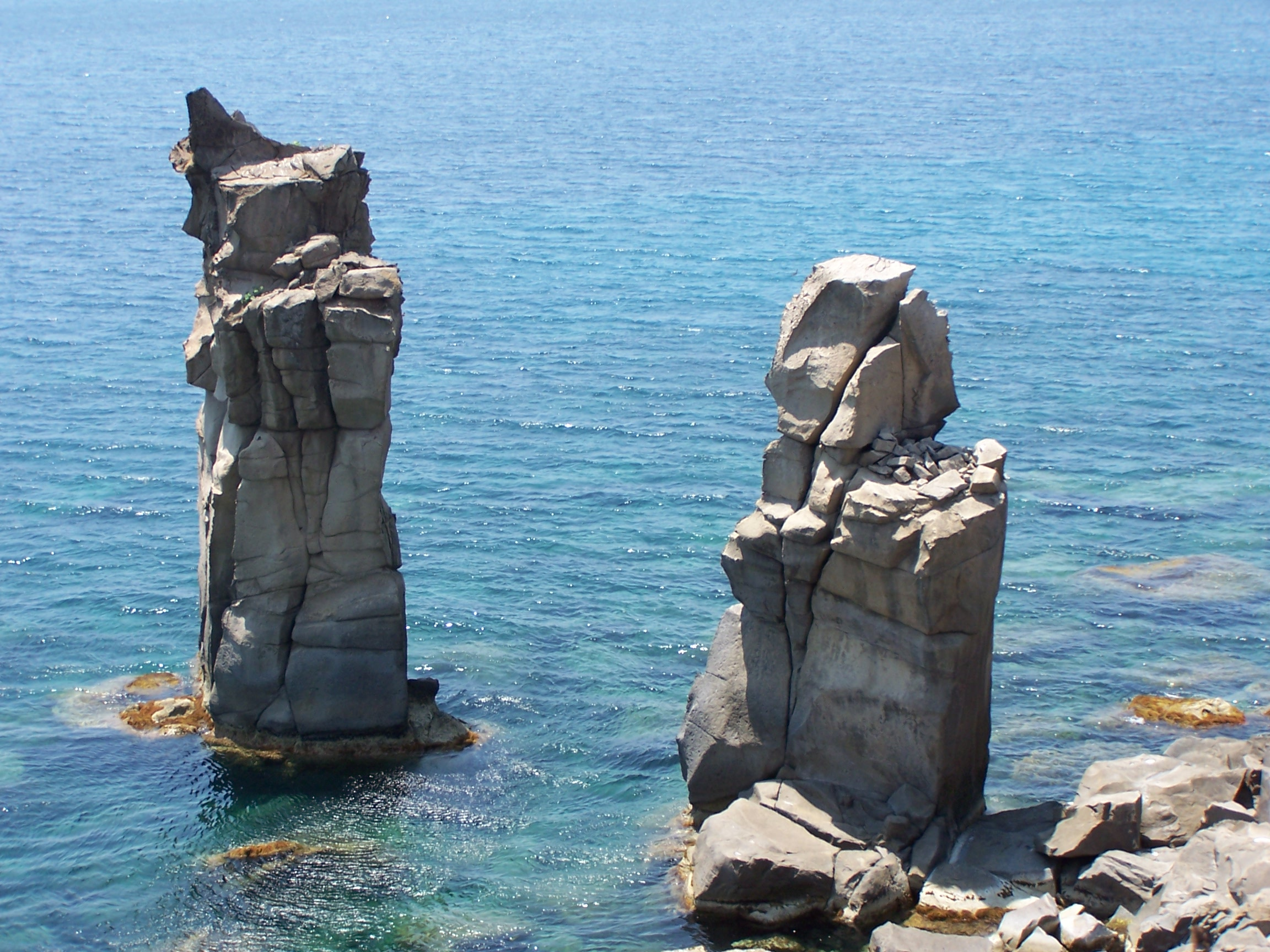
Carloforte, the "Columns"

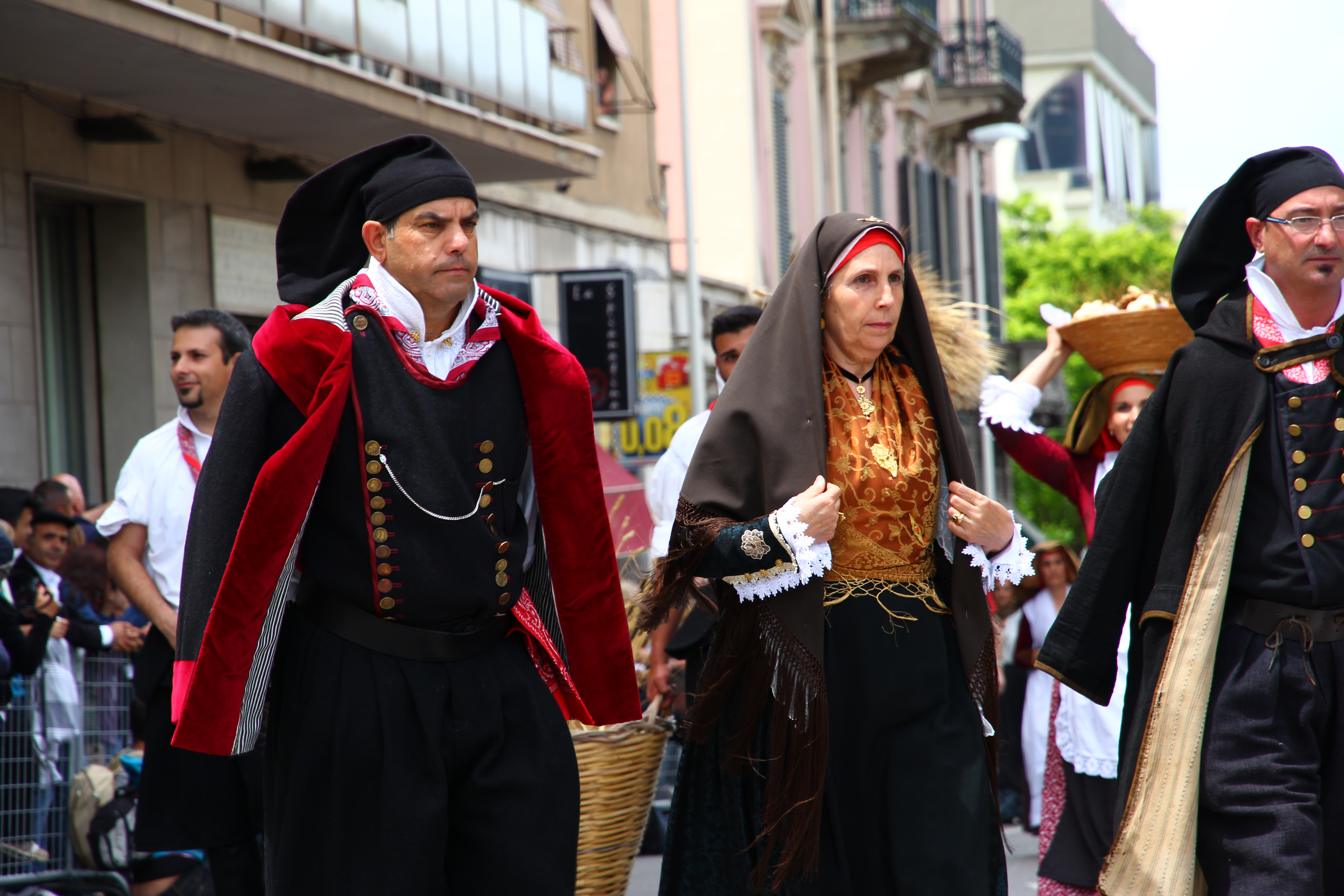
Santadi, traditional costume

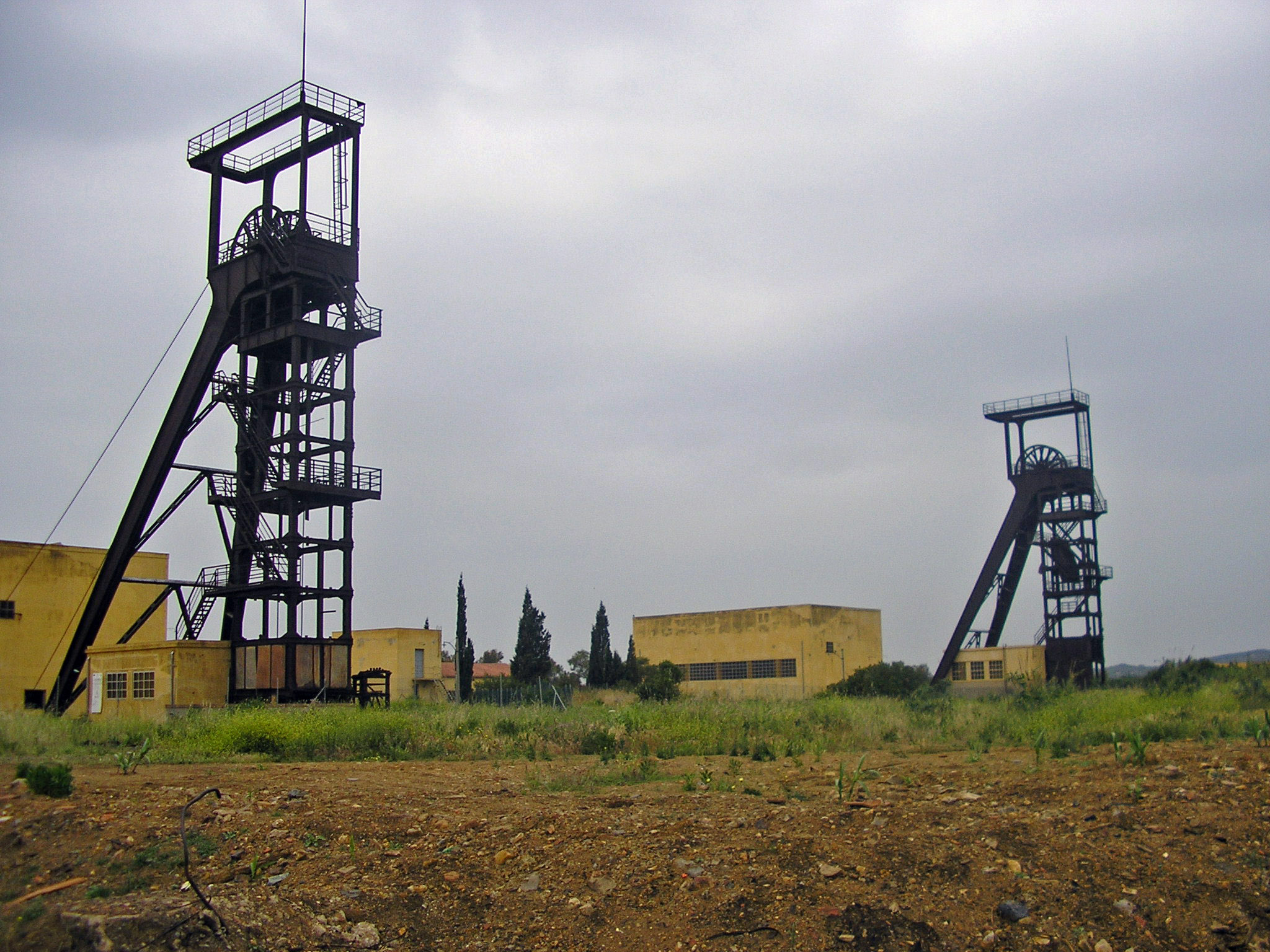
A former coal mine in Sulcis.

In the Middle Bronze Age also in the Sulcis spread the Nuragic civilization resulting in the construction of dozens of nuraghi (many of which of the complex typology as the Nuraghe Sirai or the Nuraghe Meurra), villages, holy wells and giant tombs. The occurrence of nuraghi in the region seems to strongly be related to elevated outcrops giving the advantage of a raised position and stable foundations.

Sulcis is named after the ancient Phoenician (and then Punic and Roman) city of Sulci (Solki), near the present-day Sant'Antioco.

In the Middle Ages the Sulcis was part of a Curatoria of the giudicato of Cagliari which included the entire south-western part of Sardinia. From 1258 to 1355, after the fall of the giudicato, it was under the rule of the pisan della Gherardesca family and then, from 1355, it was incorporated in the Kingdom of Sardinia by the Aragonese.

The medieval diocese of Sulcis retained its name until the move of the seat from Tratalias to Iglesias in 1506. It had two cathedrals: the first in the ancient city of Sulci, the Roman-Byzantine basilica dedicated to the founder of the diocese, Antiochus of Sulcis; the second in a Romanesque church in the village of Tratalias dedicated to Saint Mary of Montserrat.

From the 14th century to the modern era, as a result of wars (Sardinian–Aragonese war), the black plague and saracen raids, this territory was completely depopulated, Giovanni Francesco Fara in 1580 described this region has wild and abandoned. In the 17th century there were only two inhabited villages in the entire Sulcis, Portoscuso and Teulada. In the 18th century, during the Savoy era, began a process of repopulation, mainly carried out by families from the nearby Iglesiente, particularly from Iglesias, who were granted lands of feudal domains for the exercise of the agriculture and pastoralism. The distance of the concessions from the residential centers in the north, in the order of tens of kilometers, was such as to require the construction of permanent settlements for residential purposes and protection of the territory, the so-called furriadroxius and the medaus. This dynamic has therefore favored a colonization with a population dispersed in scattered settlements of small size, comparable to small modest farms but basically autonomous.

The arrival of new families of settlers, over time, developed a tendency of furriadroxius to congregate around a church. The original settlements, following these enlargements, turned into an aggregated group of more housing units, called boddeu (set of furriadroxius), similar to a village but with no roads. Most of the inhabited centers of the Sulcis, today communes or villages, have developed between the 18th and 19th centuries because of expansion of boddeus, taking the name of the ancient medieval centers disappeared. Even the Sant'Antioco Island and the San Pietro Island were repopulated with the birth, near the ancient ruins Sulci, of Sant'Antioco, which developed around the Byzantine era basilica dedicated to the eponymous saint of the island, and Carloforte (1738) and Calasetta (1770), populated by Ligurian refugees coming from the island of Tabarka, Tunisia.

The region has rich coal deposits, commercially exploited since the 1850s. Coal mining has been the primary source of sustenance of the local population for many years. However, after hitting a peak during the Fascist regime with the foundation of Carbonia, coal production has been largely abandoned by the early 1970s. Today, Sulcis is one of the poorest places in Italy, characterized by sky-high unemployment and emigration.

== See also ==
- Sulcis Mountains
- Iglesiente
