= Raid of Carloforte =

Date	September 2, 1798
Location	Carloforte, Sardinia
Result	Tunisian Victory
Territorial changes	Capture of Carloforte

Belligerents
Beylik of Tunis	Kingdom of Sardinia (1720–1861)

Commanders and leaders
Unknown	Unknown

Strength
1000 tunisian corsairs 10 ships	Unknown

Casualties and losses
	800 prisoners

The Raid of Carloforte took place on 2 September 1798. It was a raid organized by the corsairs of the Beylik of Tunis against the small town of Carloforte, located on the island of San Pietro in Sardinia.

== Background ==
According to accounts of the raid, a sailor from the island of Capraia travelled to Tunis after being betrayed by his wife and convinced the corsairs to raid Carloforte. In addition, Carloforte was known as a settlement of Christian refugees from the island of Tabarka, which provided an additional motive for the expedition.

== The Raid ==
The corsairs landed at Carloforte and blocked the coastline to prevent the inhabitants from escaping. They then looted the town and completely destroyed the parish churches. The corsairs departed on 3 September 1798, taking more than 800 prisoners with them.

== Aftermath ==
Following this success, Tunisian corsairs attacked the island of La Maddalena on 14 October 1799, but the attack was unsuccessful. The same was true of the attack on the island of Giglio on 18 November 1799. However, on 15 October 1815, the corsairs launched another raid on Carloforte and succeeded for a second time.

== Sources ==
- Usai, Stefano (2023). 1 rapporto la Sardegna e il Mediterraneo (PDF) (in Italian).
- Panzac, Daniel (2002). Les esclaves et leurs rançons chez les Barbaresques (in French).
- Bono, Salvatore (2006). L’incursione dei corsari tunisini a Carloforte e il riscatto degli schiavi carolini (1798-1803) (PDF) (in Italian).
- Panzac, Daniel (2005). Les corsaires barbaresques, la fin d’une légende (in French).
