= Walls of Tabarca =

Wall of Tabarca
- Interactive map of the Wall of Tabarca area

General information
- Type: Defensive Wall
- Location: Tabarca, Alicante, Spain
- Construction started: 1769
- Owner: Government of Spain

Design and construction
- Architect: Fernando Méndez de Ras

The Wall of Tabarca is a defensive wall built in the 18th century. It is located in the town of Tabarca, Alicante. It was designed by Fernando Méndez de Ras, a military engineer who also planned the rest of the building on the island. The wall has three gates, all of them baroque.

== Characteristics ==
The shape of the wall is adapted to the island coastline. It is built in stone, with the outside covered in ashlar. Since the 1980s, there have been some reconstructions and rehabilitations. The wall has three gates: San Rafael or Eastern Gate, La Trancada or Saint Gabriel Gate and Alicante or Saint Michael Gate.
