= Accipitrum =

Accipitrum may refer to:

- Sparrowhawk
- Accipitrum insula, ancient name of San Pietro Island
- Accipitrum insula (Red Sea), island in the Red Sea
