= Capo Sandalo Lighthouse =

Lighthouse in Sardinia, Italy

Capo Sandalo
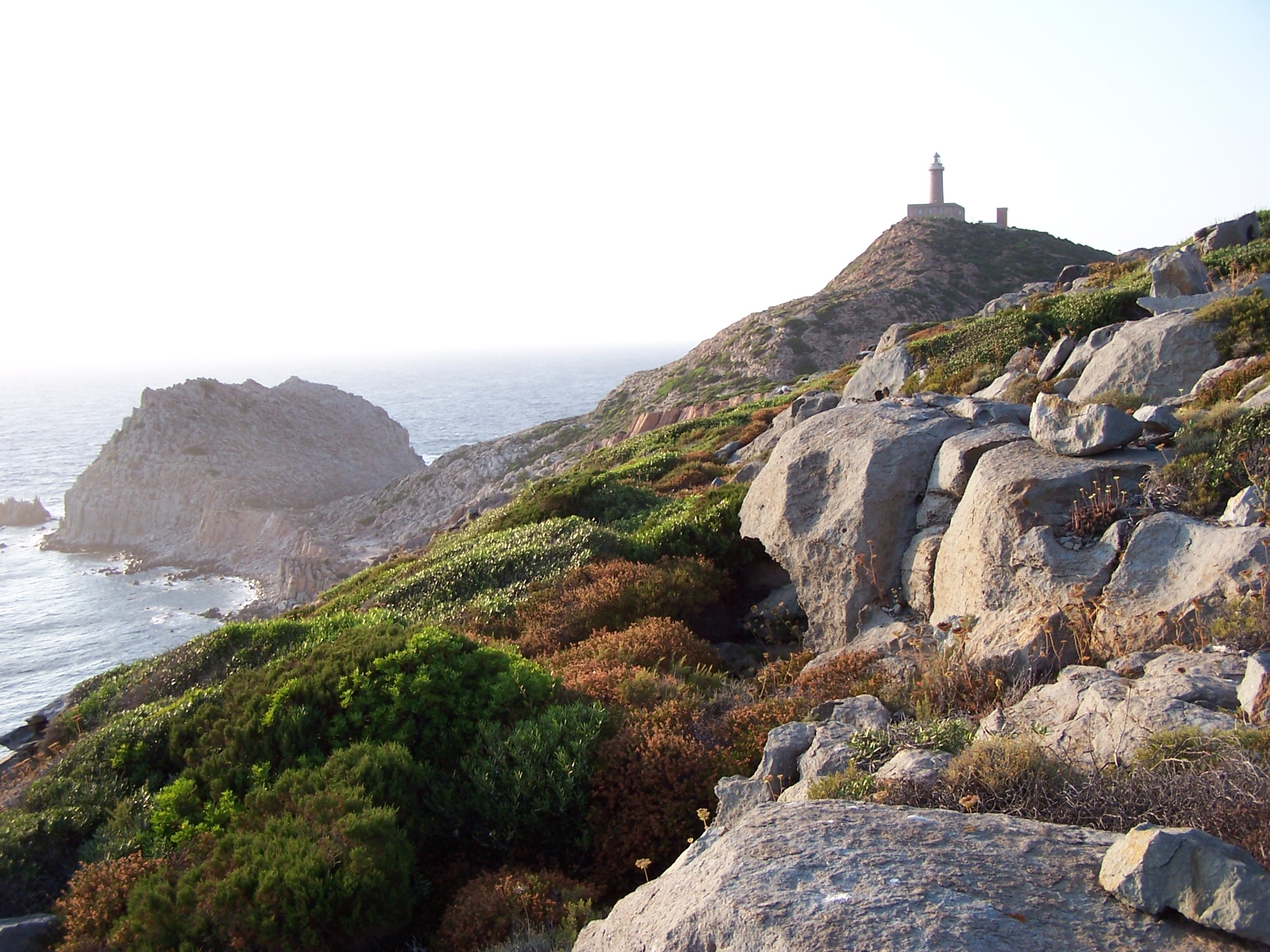
- Capo Sandalo, San Pietro Island
- Location: San Pietro Island; Sardinia; Italy
- Coordinates: 39°08′51″N 8°13′25″E

Tower
- Constructed: 1864
- Foundation: stone base
- Construction: stone tower and keeper's house
- Automated: 1994
- Height: 30 metres (98 ft)
- Shape: cylindrical tower on a two-story keeper's house
- Markings: unpainted tower
- Power source: mains electricity
- Operator: Marina Militare
- Heritage: Italian national heritage

Light
- Focal height: 134 metres (440 ft)
- Lens: type OR 700 focal length: 350 mm
- Intensity: main: AL 1000 W reserve: LABI 100 W
- Range: main: 24 nautical miles (44 km; 28 mi) reserve: 19 nautical miles (35 km; 22 mi)
- Characteristic: Fl (4) W 20s.
- Italy no.: 1384 E.F

The Capo Sandalo Lighthouse (Italian: Faro di Capo Sandalo) is prominent lighthouse on the westernmost point of San Pietro Island marking the southwestern corner of Sardinia, Italy.

== Description ==
The original stone tower was built in 1864. It is an active aid to marine and aeronautical navigation. The focal plane is 134 metres (440 ft) tall, perched on top of a cliff, and emits four white flashes in a 20 seconds period visible up to a distance of 24 nautical miles (44 km; 28 mi). The tower itself is 30 metres (98 ft) with lantern and gallery, attached to the front of a 2-story stone keeper's house. To this day, the lighthouse remains a beautiful structure of unpainted stone, with a gray metallic lantern dome. The lighthouse is now automated, and a keeper lived on premises until recently. Chart references: ARLHS SAR-018; Admiralty E1090; NGA 8432. French charts 7332. The lighthouse is connected by a well paved road to the main town of Carloforte on San Pietro Island.

== See also ==
- List of lighthouses in Italy
- San Pietro Island
