= Tabarca =

Islet in the Mediterranean Sea

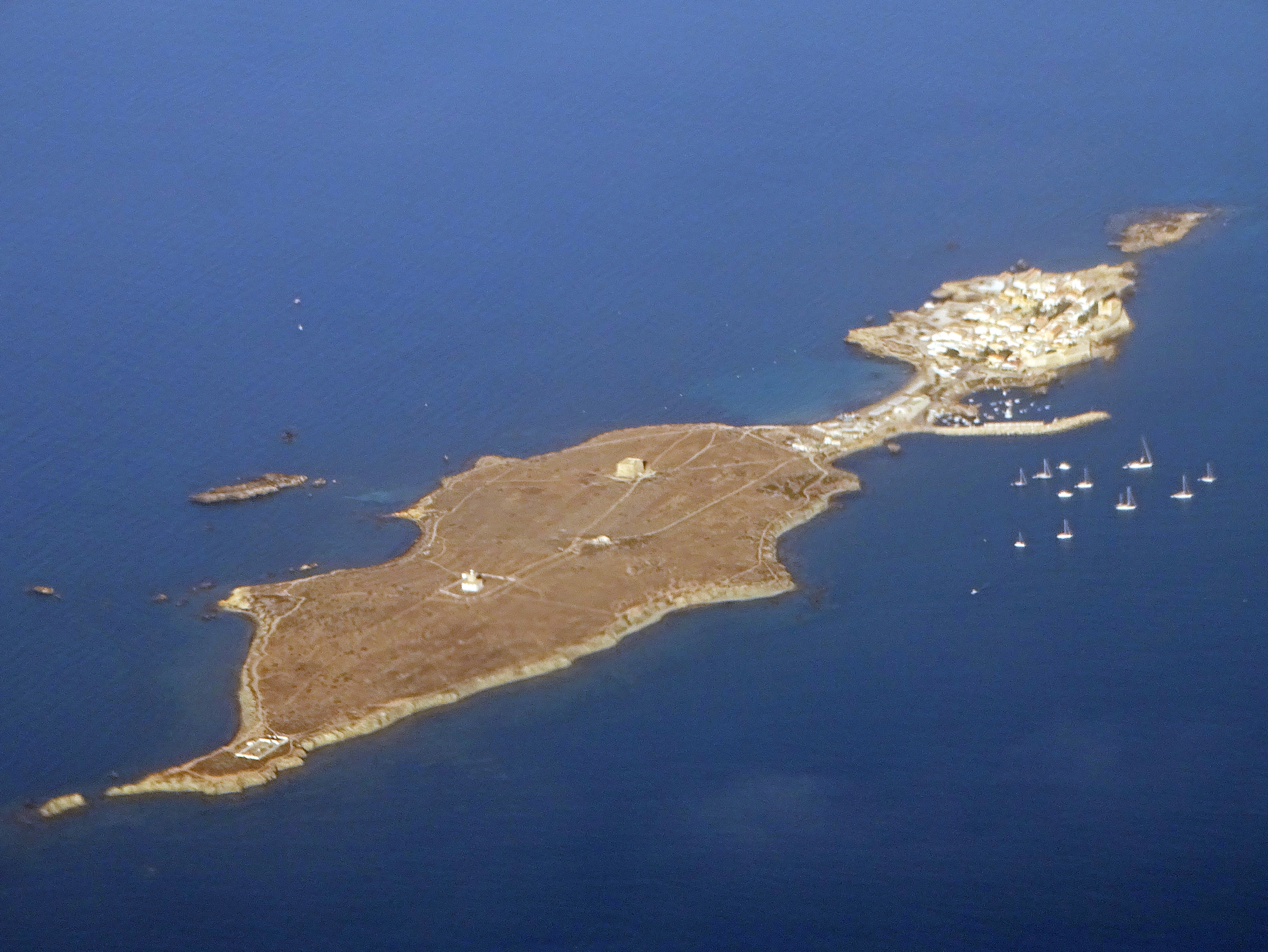
- Interactive map of Tabarca

Geography
- Coordinates: 38°09′59″N 0°28′56″W

Administration
- Spain
- Region: Valencian Community
- Province: Province of Alicante
- Municipality: Alicante

Demographics
- Population: 68 (2011)

Tabarca (Valencian: [taˈbaɾka], Spanish: [taˈβaɾka]), also known as Nova Tabarca and Illa Plana in Valencian (Spanish: Nueva Tabarca, Isla Plana), is an islet located in the Mediterranean Sea, close to the town of Santa Pola, in the province of Alicante, Valencian community, Spain. Tabarca is the largest island in the Valencian Community, and the smallest permanently inhabited islet in Spain. It is known for its marine reserve.

== History ==
Before 1700, the island was known as Illa de Sant Pau ('Saint Paul's Island') or Illa Plana ('Flat Island'). Believed to be the island that St. Paul disembarked on, the island was a refuge for Barbary pirates up to the end of the 18th century and used as a base for raids on the Levantine coast.

The island's current namesake is a Tunisian islet and town of Tabarka, which was a part of the Republic of Genoa until it was conquered by the Bey of Tunis in 1741. In 1760, Charles III of Spain ordered the fortification and repopulation of the Spanish island. A group of Genoese sailors who had been shipwrecked near the Tunisian Tabarka were rescued and settled here.

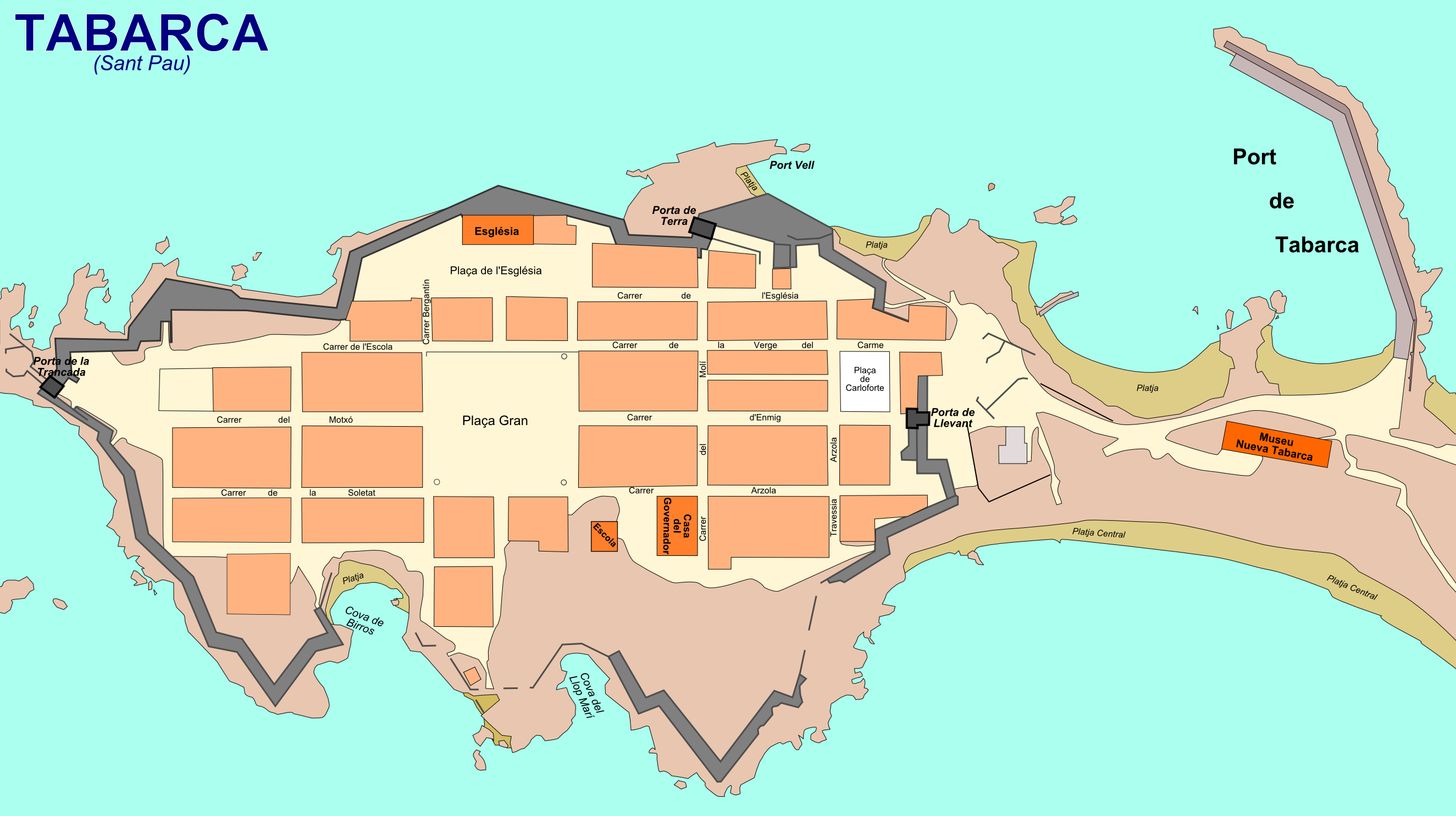
Plan of the city.

On their arrival, the Genoese were first moved to Alicante, where they lived temporarily in the Jesuit School, which was empty after the expulsion of the Jesuits from Spain. Eventually, the Genoese were moved to the island, together with a Spanish garrison. The military engineer Fernando Méndez Ras planned a fortified town and walls, bulwarks, warehouses and barracks were built. From 1770, the island was renamed Nova Tabarca ("New Tabarca" in both Valencian and Latin).

Although the Genoese assimilated, abandoning their language in favor of Valencian and, later, Spanish (both languages are currently spoken on the islet), the Genoese descent of the settlers can still be found in the surnames of Italian origin common on the islet.

The island is twinned with Carloforte, in the Sardinian San Pietro Island, which was also populated with Genoese from Tunisian Tabarka.

The gateways are still visible and so are the Governor's House (currently a hotel) and the church of St Peter and St Paul, concluded in 1779.

In 1850, the governor and the garrison were removed. At the end of the 19th century, the island had a population of around 1,000 people mainly devoted to fishing. In the early 21st century, the permanent population was around 50, making Tabarca the smallest permanently inhabited Spanish island (although this number is multiplied by ten during the tourist season in summer).

The main activity of the local population is fishing, with the catch brought to Santa Pola's fish market, but tourism becomes the most important resource during summer, especially in July and August.

== Geography ==
Tabarca lies approximately 8 nautical miles (15 km; 9.2 mi) south-southeast of Alicante and 5 nautical miles (9.3 km; 5.8 mi) east-southeast of Santa Pola. Despite being more related to the fishing port of Santa Pola, both socially and economically, the island is administratively a part of the city of Alicante, managed as a rural district of Alicante jointly with el Palmeral, Aiguamarga and Urbanova.

The islet is 1.8 km (1.1 mi) long, has a maximum breadth of 0.4 km (0.25 mi), and rises to only 15 m (49 ft) at its highest point. Close to the main islet lie the islets of la Nau, la Galera, and la Cantera.

The local census (2011) counted 68 inhabitants. The postal code is 03138.

Tourism is the main economical activity, especially during the summer. There are several ferries that connect Tabarca with Alicante, Santa Pola, and Torrevieja which operate at higher frequencies during the summer.

Tabarca has a semi-arid climate similar to the climate found in the city of Alicante, with scarce rainfall, wunder 300 millimetres (12 inches) on average. The Mediterranean Sea heavily influences the island's climate, making its average and extreme high and low temperatures all milder than in Alicante. In a normal year, the maximum temperatures do not exceed 35 °C (95 °F) during the summer or drop below 5 °C (41 °F) during the winter.

== Ecology ==
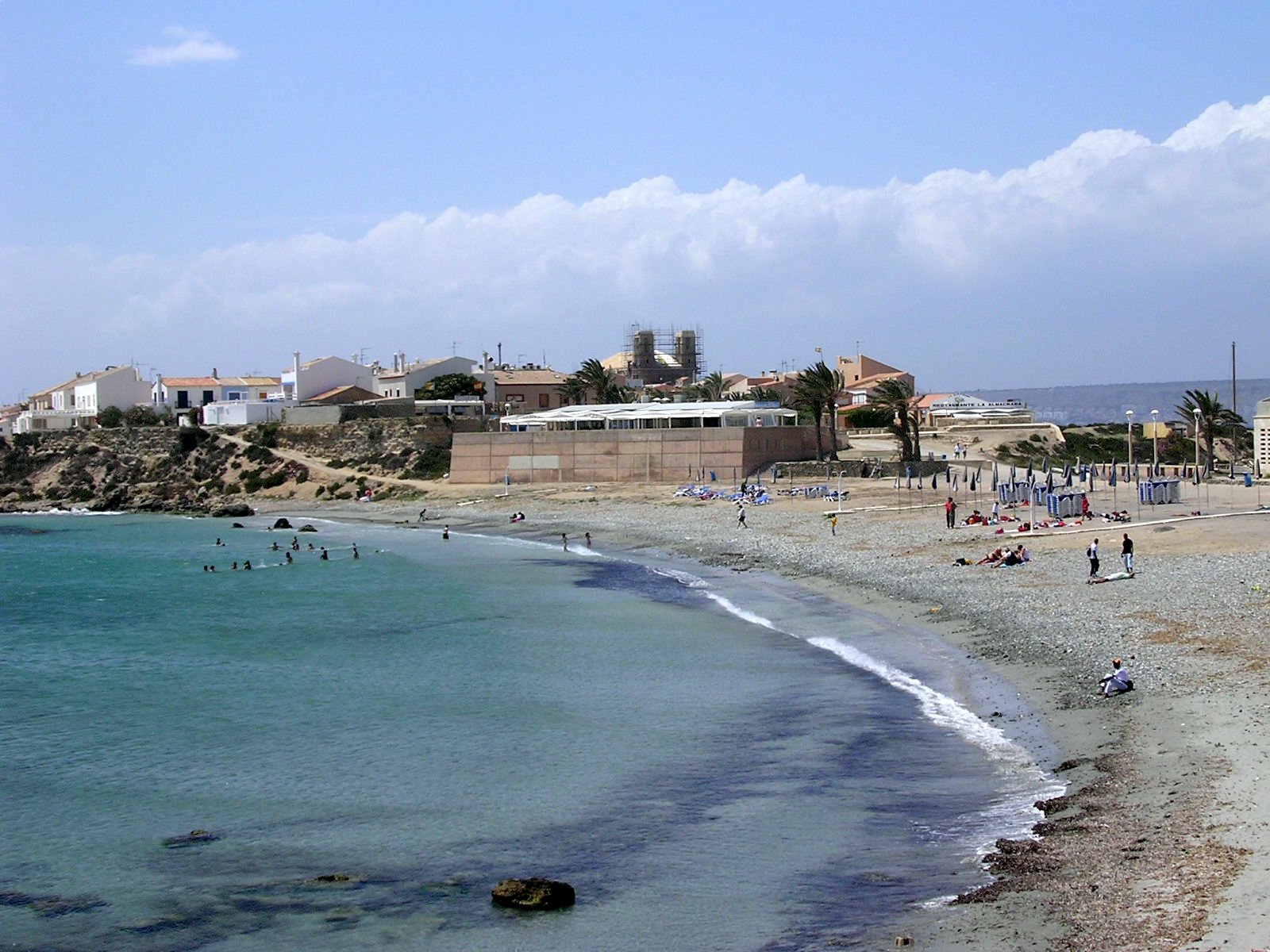
A view of Tabarca beach.

Tabarca was formed by materials of volcanic origin on top of which limestone and Quaternary deposits have settled.

Tabarca is surrounded by very clear and unpolluted waters. It is a protected marine reserve called the Reserva marina de la Isla de Tabarca (Tabarca Island Marine Reserve), with a variety of marine fauna including sea bass, grouper, conger eel, and gilt-head bream. The European Union has declared it a Zone of Special Protection for Birds.

Tabarca was the last Spanish Mediterranean location where the critically endangered Mediterranean monk seal successfully bred before it became extinct in this part of its range in the 1960s. This proved the high quality of the waters around the island in terms of marine ecology and, therefore, the waters around Tabarca were declared a marine reserve in 1986, the first of its kind in Spain. This status was granted mainly due to its submarine posidonia prairie, which is the largest in the Spanish Mediterranean and has an extraordinary ecological value in terms of marine fauna and flora.

In order to both enhance Tabarca's marine biodiversity and protect it from fishing, the Marine Reserve authorities placed an artificial reef near the island.

== See also ==
- Calasetta
- La Herradura
