= Tabarchino =

Ligurian dialect spoken in Sardinia

- Tabarkino
- tabarchin
- Native to: Italy
- Region: Sardinia
- Language family: Indo-European: Italic; Romance; Western; Gallo-Romance; Gallo-Italic; Ligurian; Tabarchino

Official status
- Recognised minority language in: Sardinia

Language codes
- ISO 639-3: –
- IETF: lij-u-sd-itsd
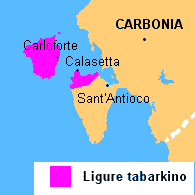

Tabarchino or Tabarkino (endonym: tabarchin) is a dialect of the Ligurian language spoken in Sardinia.

Tabarchino is spoken in the communities of Carloforte on San Pietro Island and Calasetta on Sant'Antioco Island, which are located in the Archipelago of Sulcis in the Province of South Sardinia.

Tabarchino enjoys regional recognition through the laws on the promotion of the Sardinian language and culture (l.r. N.26/97, l.r. N.22/18).

Carloforte Tabarchino retains very few archaisms and is very close to modern Genoese; on the other hand, Calasetta Tabarchino has many more archaisms and is very close to 17th century Ligurian, and its lexicon is also more Sardinian-influenced. The two dialects share words of Tunisian Arabic and French derivation.

== See also ==
- Gallo-Italic languages
- Ligurian (Romance language)
- Tabarka
- Carloforte
- Calasetta
