= Calasetta =

Calasetta: Cala Seda (Sardinian); Câdesédda (Ligurian)
- Comune
- Comune di Calasetta
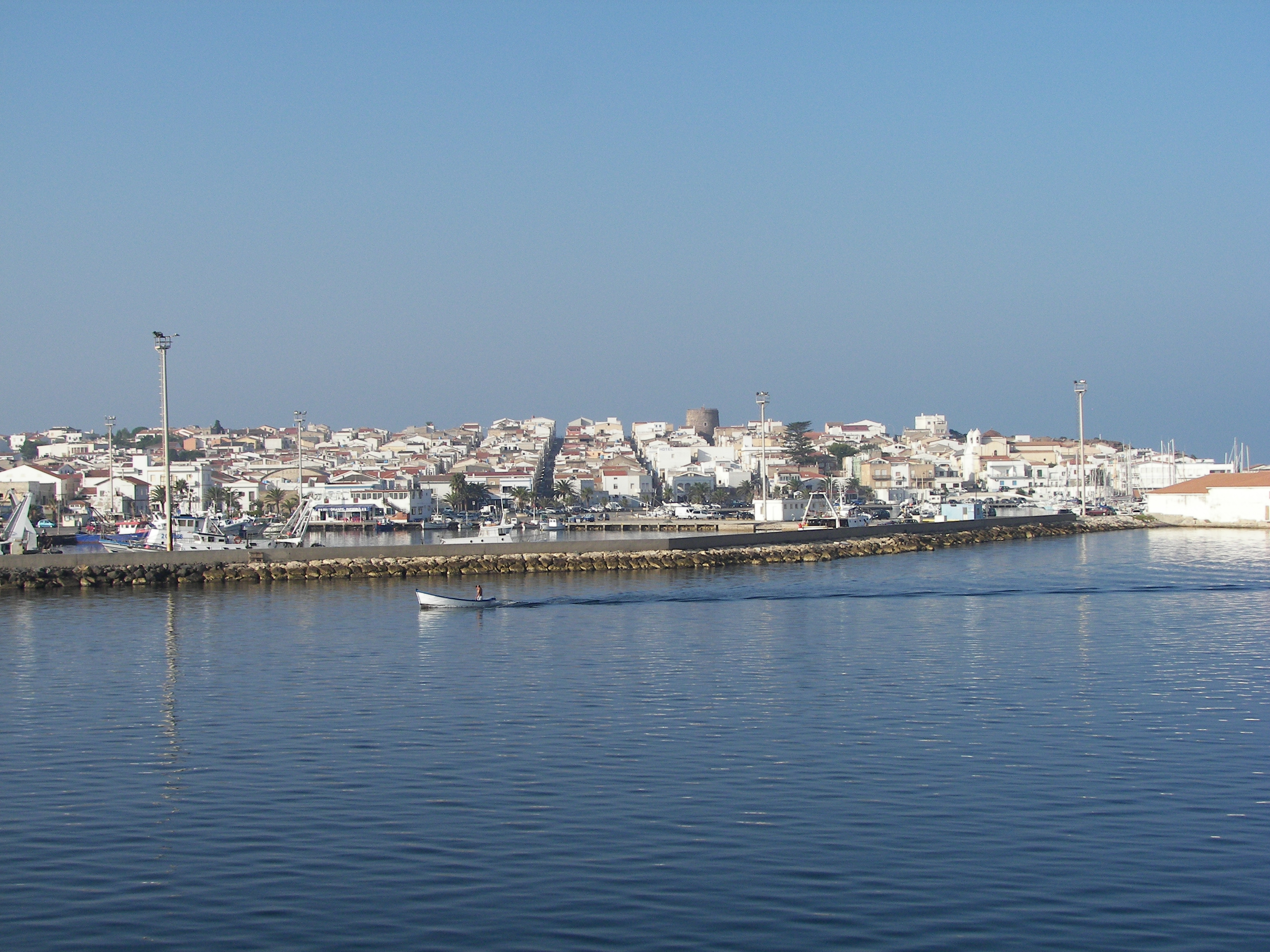
- View from the sea

- Coat of arms

- Location within Sardinia
- Coordinates: 39°7′N 8°22′E
- Country: Italy
- Region: Sardinia
- Province: Sulcis Iglesiente
- Frazioni: Cussorgia

Government
  - Mayor: Claudia Mura

Area
  - Total: 31.06 km^{2} (11.99 sq mi)

Population (2026)
  - Total: 2,776
  - Density: 89.38/km^{2} (231.5/sq mi)
- Demonym: Calasettani
- Time zone: UTC+1 (CET)
  - Summer (DST): UTC+2 (CEST)
- Postal code: 09011
- Dialing code: 0781
- Patron saint: St. Maurice
- Saint day: September 22

Calasetta (Sardinian: Cala Seda, Tabarchino Ligurian: Câdesédda) is a town and comune (municipality) located on the island of Sant'Antioco, in the Province of Sulcis Iglesiente of the autonomous island region of Sardinia in Italy. With a population of 2,776, it is the less populous of the 2 towns on the island, the more populous being Sant'Antioco, which is also the only municipality bordering Calasetta.

== History ==
While the town itself dates to 1770. In the middle of the 16th century a group of Ligurian families - many of them from Pegli near Genoa - moved to a deserted island off the coast of the Tunisian city of Tabarka in order to work the waters as coral fishermen. These families worked under the tutelage of the wealthy Genoese Lomellini family. These enterprising Ligurian families of Tabarka quickly expanded from coral fishing to trade between the African interior and European markets. Soon, they rose to positions of wealth and success and were awarded the titles of Marquis of Tabarka. Originally the Tabarkini (as descendants in Calasetta are sometimes still called) were protected by the Spanish crown, but increasing population strain, incursions by Barbary pirates, and expansionist competition by France began a long period of trials for many Tabarkini.

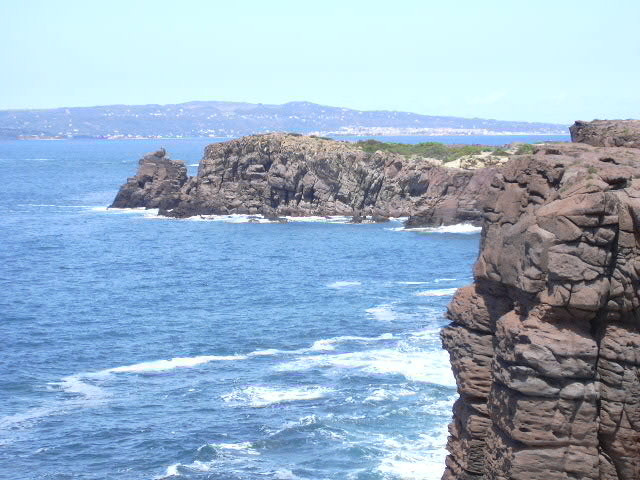
Nido dei Passeri rock on the coast of Calasetta.

In 1738 a group of Tabarkini decided to leave the island off the Tunisian coast permanently. They were received by King Charles Emmanuel III of Savoy in the Kingdom of Sardinia, who gave them the Island of San Pietro to settle. When the Bey of Tunis learned that the Lomellini family intended to cede control of the island to his enemies the French, he invaded the island, destroying homes and warehouses and capturing and enslaving much of the population. Part of the liberated Tabarkini settled in Carloforte, in the San Pietro Island, while other received permission to settle the uninhabited Sant'Antioco, then originating the village of Calasetta. In 1773, more colonists from Piedmont asked for permission to settle Calasetta, but illness and unexpected conditions caused them to return almost immediately.

== Demographics ==
As of 2026, the population is 2,776, of which 50.2% are male, and 49.8% are female. Minors make up 11.1% of the population, and seniors make up 33.9%.

Historical population

Year	Pop.	±%
1861	522	—
1871	709	+35.8%
1881	913	+28.8%
1901	1,451	+58.9%
1911	1,710	+17.8%
1921	2,127	+24.4%
1931	2,619	+23.1%
1936	2,579	−1.5%

Year	Pop.	±%
1951	2,703	+4.8%
1961	2,677	−1.0%
1971	2,408	−10.0%
1981	2,678	+11.2%
1991	2,681	+0.1%
2001	2,745	+2.4%
2011	2,822	+2.8%
2021	2,802	−0.7%

Source: ISTAT

=== Immigration ===
As of 2025, immigrants make up 3.3% of the total population. The 5 largest foreign countries of birth are Romania, Germany, Switzerland, Belgium, and France.

== Culture ==
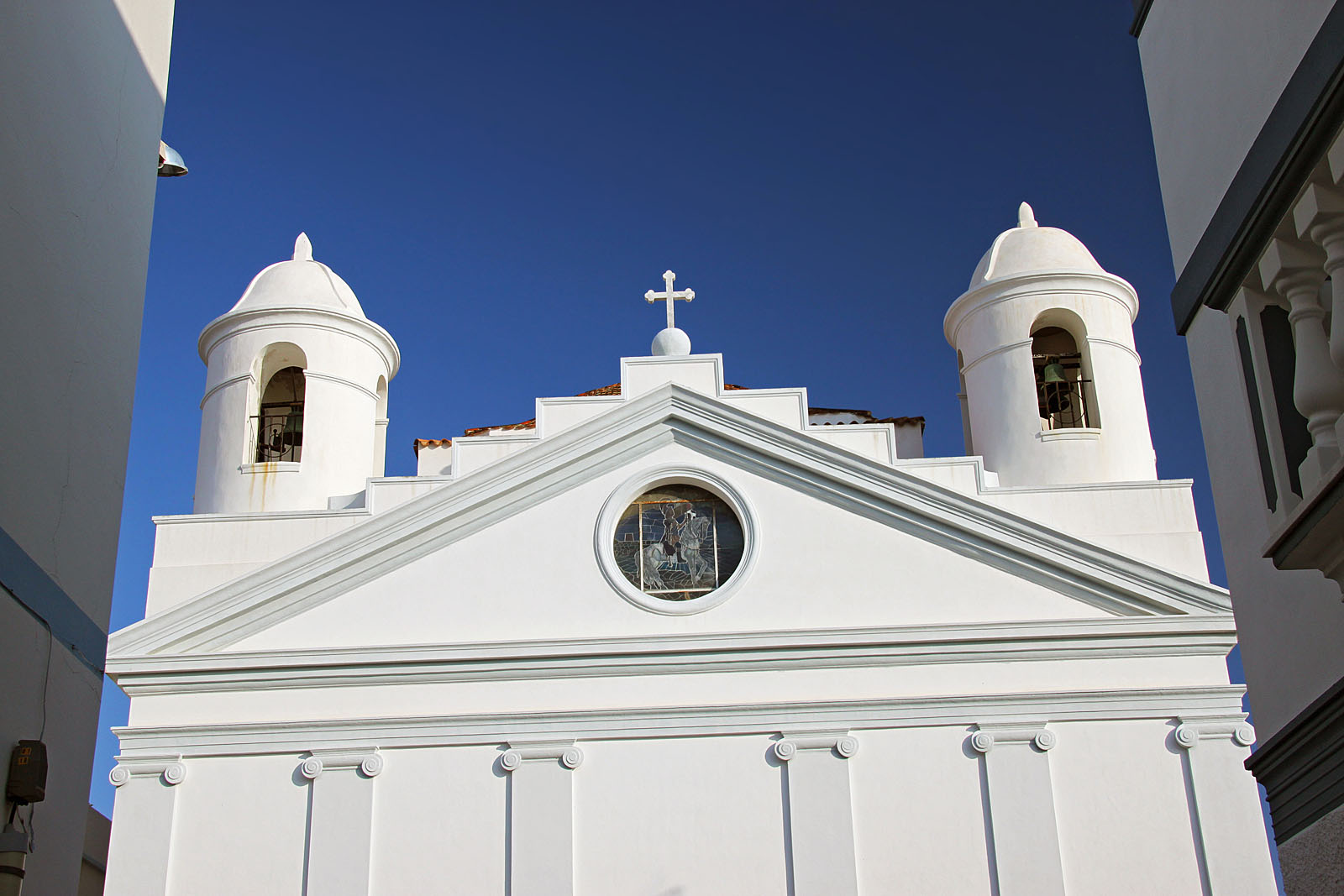
St. Maurice church

The local dialect, called Tabarkino, is still today similar to that spoken in Pegli and Genoa.

Calasetta is the birthplace of criminal Pietro De Negri (known as Il Canaro).

== Economy ==
Today Calasetta is a favored tourist destination with beaches, a port, and a fishing industry.

== Twin towns - sister cities ==
- Pegli, Italy
- Arenzano, Italy

== See also ==
- Genoese-Tabarka diaspora
  - Tabarka
  - San Pietro Island
  - Carloforte
  - Tabarca
