= San Pietro Island =

Island off the coast of Sardinia, Italy

Coordinates: 39°08′44″N 8°18′21″E

Location of San Pietro Island in Sardinia

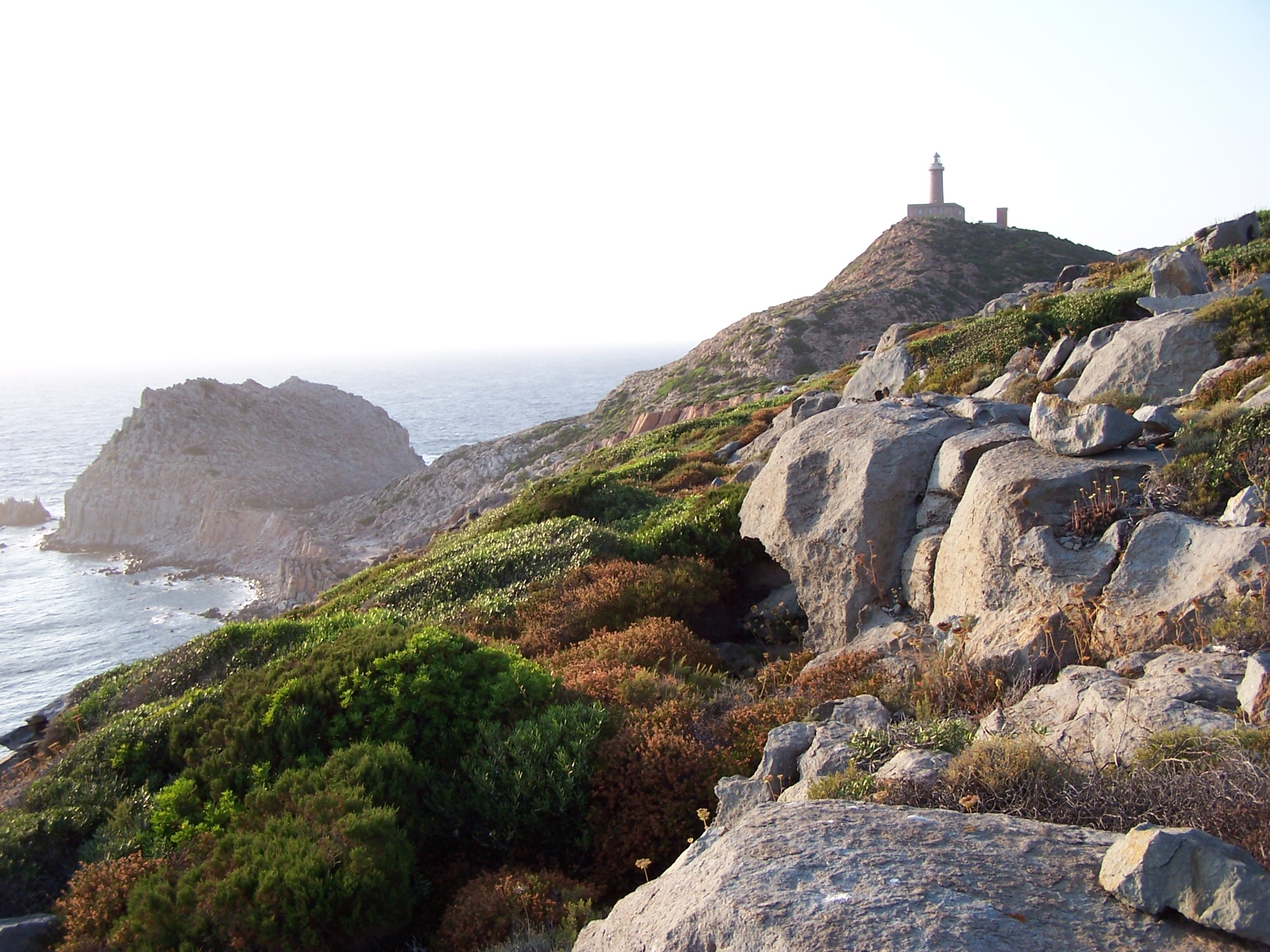
The coast and the lighthouse of Capo Sandalo

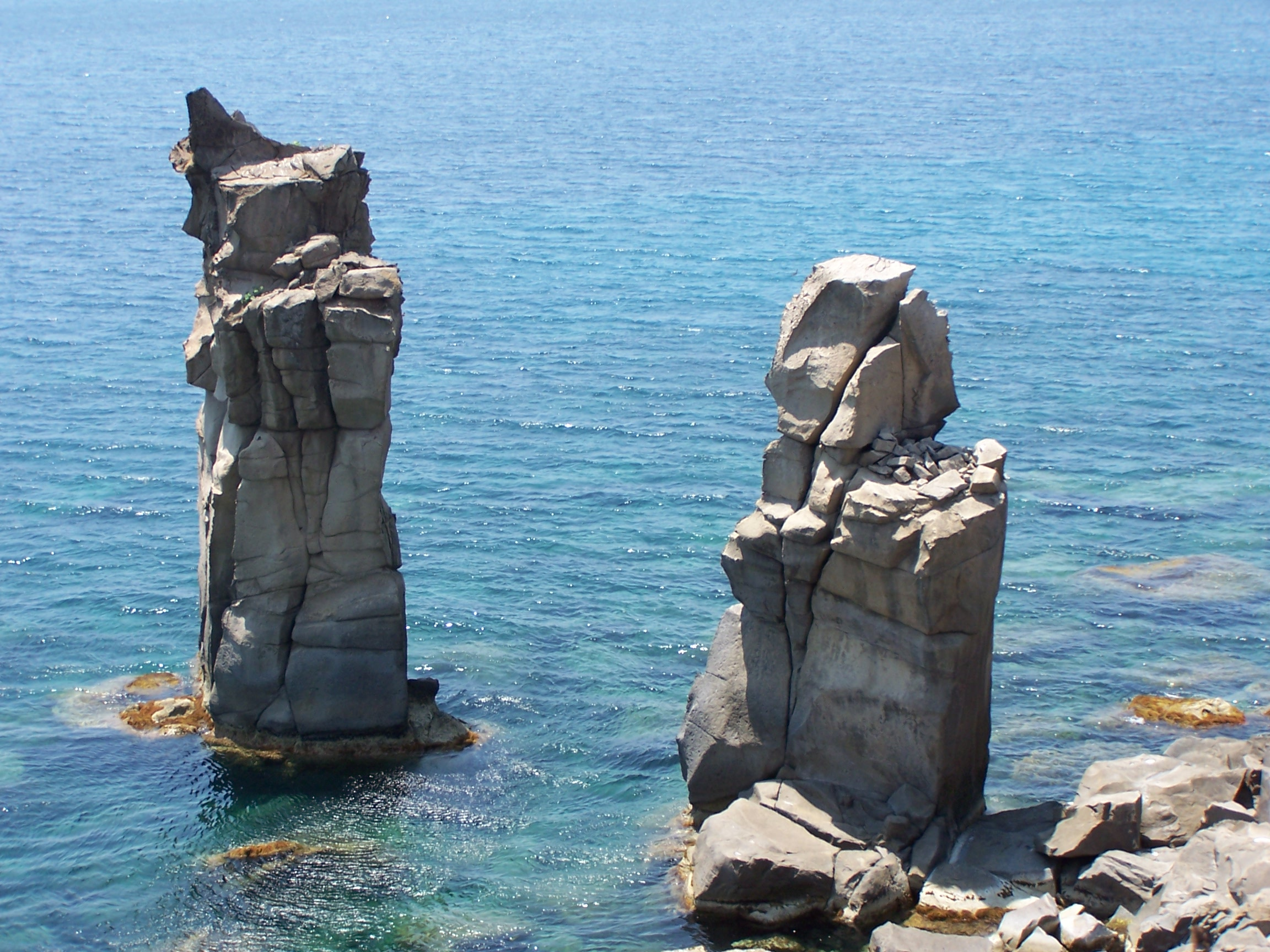
The so-called "Columns of Carloforte"

San Pietro Island (Italian: Isola di San Pietro, Ligurian Tabarchino: Uiza de San Pé, Sardinian: Isula 'e Sàntu Pèdru) is an island approximately seven kilometres (four nautical miles) off the South western Coast of Sardinia, Italy, facing the Sulcis peninsula. With an area of 51 square kilometres (19 3/4 sq mi) it is the sixth-largest island of Italy by area. The approximately 6,000 inhabitants are mostly concentrated in the fishing town of Carloforte, the only comune in the island. It is included in the province of South Sardinia. It is named after Saint Peter.

The island is connected by regular ferry service to Portovesme and Calasetta.

== Geography ==
The island is of volcanic origin. The rocks are of Cenozoic age, and include basalt, dacite and rhyolite (including the peralkaline variety comendite). The 18 km (11 mi) of its coasts are mostly rocky; the western and northern part includes some natural grottoes, unprotected landings, with a few small beaches, in general here the coast is usually very steep, rocky. The eastern coast, on which the port of Carloforte lies, is more protected low and sandy.

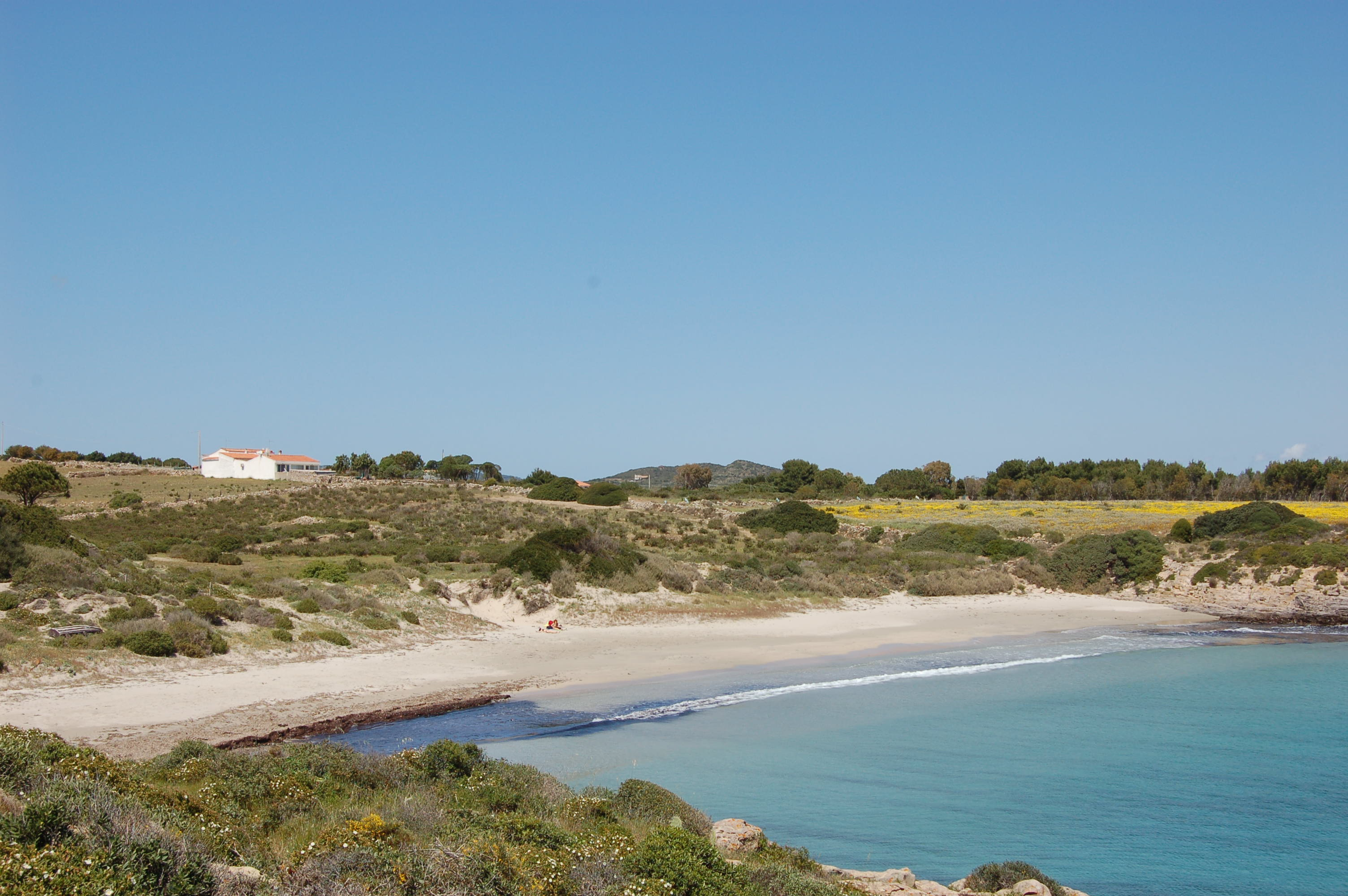
La Bobba, a sandy beach on the southern side of the island

Off the north-western coast are two small islands, the Isola dei Ratti and Isola Piana. The latter includes the remains of one of the largest tonnara in Italy, now turned into a tourist resort.

The island has no rivers or streams, but features numerous ponds and marshes. The interior is hilly, the highest points being the Bricco (hill) Guardia dei Mori (211 m (692 ft)) and Bricco Tortoriso (208 m (682 ft)).

The vegetation is that typical of the Mediterranean coast, with Cistus, mastic, strawberry tree, juniper, Aleppo pine and holm oak. Here groves of oak and pine with clearings that are often cultivated, and populated with scattered houses. Cultivation, held especially in the eastern and more protected region, includes grape (Vitis vinifera), fig and Indian fig. The western part exposed to the prevailing wind, the mistral, is more arid, with low scrub vegetation and largely uninhabited. The climate is temperate-hot. The island is connected to Sardinia and to the next island of Sant'Antioco by two ferry lines.

== History ==
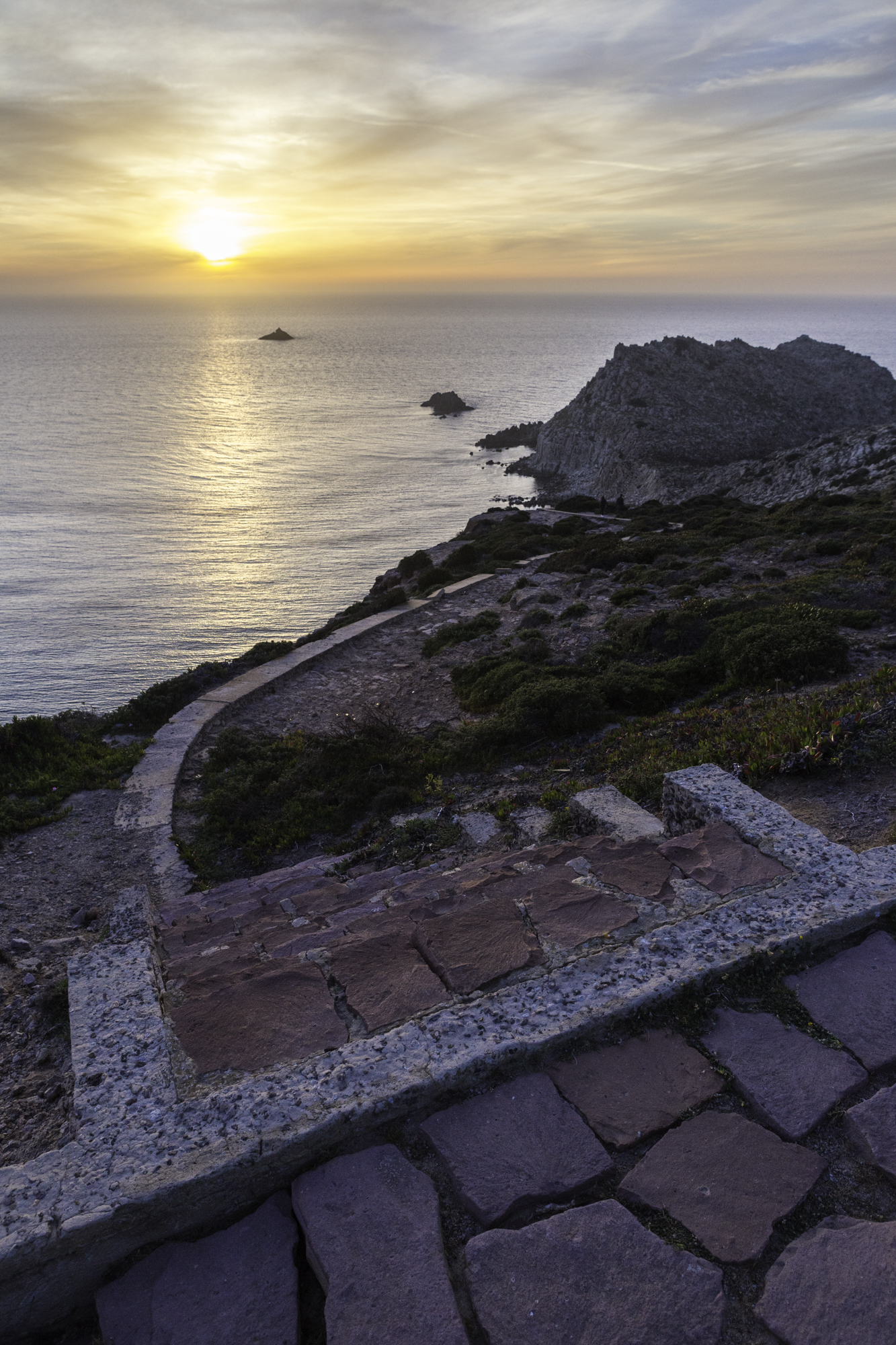
Capo Sandalo, on the west of San Pietro Island

The island has been known since ancient times. The Phoenicians called it Enosim or Inosim, which means "island of Accipiters", while for the Greek it was Hieracon Nesos and for the Romans Accipitrum Insula (Sparrowhawk Island). The latter is derived from the presence of the small Eleonora's falcon, which is still present on the island. San Pietro is home today to remains from the Phoenician, Roman and Sardinian civilizations.

According to a legend, the island is so named because St. Peter visited the island in 46 AD.

In 1739 century the then-uninhabited San Pietro was colonized by people of Ligurian language and ethnicity. They had fled the Republic of Genoa's colony on the small Tunisian island of Tabarka, established in 1542 for the purpose of coral fishing, after it had been taken over by the Bey of Tunisia. Today most of the population has retained a variant of the Genoese dialect, called Tabarchino, which is also spoken in Calasetta, in the northern part of the neighboring Sant'Antioco island, whose residents are of the same origin. The island is twinned with the Spanish island of Tabarca, which was likewise settled by former residents of the Tabarkan colony.

The town of Carloforte (Fort Charles) on the Island of San Pietro was dedicated to Charles Emmanuel III of Sardinia, who had granted the island to the Tabarkan refugees.

== See also ==
- List of islands of Italy
- Genoese-Tabarka diaspora
  - Tabarka
  - Calasetta
  - Tabarca

== Bibliography ==
- Simone Baldo, The new continent. San Pietro island. Sardinia., 2015, Private Edition
