= Carloforte =

Carloforte Carlufòrti (Sardinian) U Pàize (Ligurian)
- Comune
- Comune di Carloforte
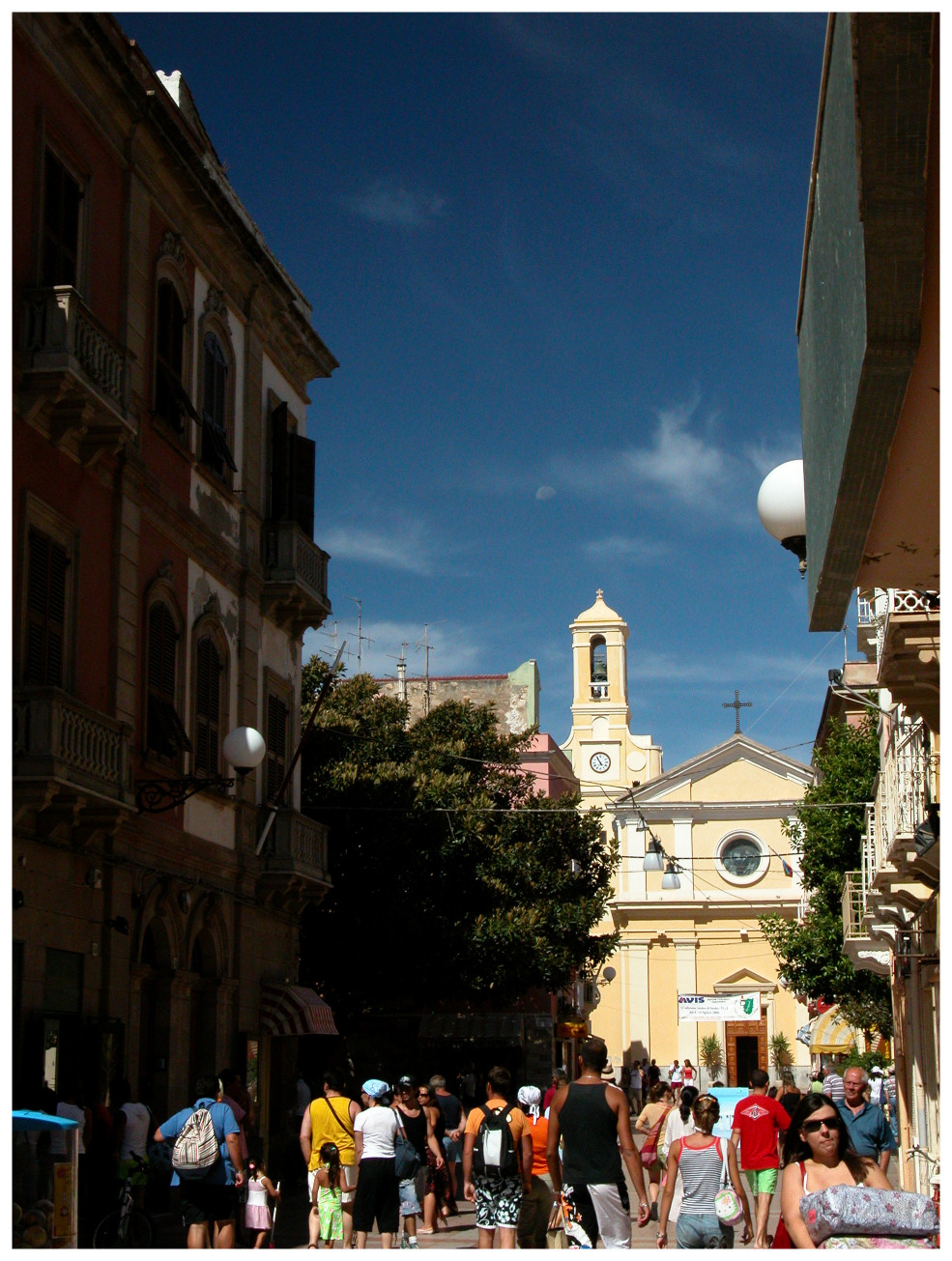

- Coat of arms

- Location within Sardinia
- Coordinates: 39°9′N 8°18′E
- Country: Italy
- Region: Sardinia
- Province: Sulcis Iglesiente

Government
  - Mayor: Salvatore Puggioni

Area
  - Total: 51.10 km^{2} (19.73 sq mi)
- Elevation: 10 m (33 ft)

Population (2026)
  - Total: 5,851
  - Density: 114.5/km^{2} (296.6/sq mi)
- Demonym: Carlofortini or Tabarchini
- Time zone: UTC+1 (CET)
  - Summer (DST): UTC+2 (CEST)
- Postal code: 09014
- Dialing code: 0781
- Patron saint: St. Charles Borromeo
- Saint day: November 4
- Website: Official website

Carloforte (Sardinian: Carlufòrti, Tabarchino: U Pàize, lit. 'The Village, The Town') is a fishing and resort town and comune (municipality) in the province of Sulcis Iglesiente in the autonomous island region of Sardinia in Italy, located on Isola di San Pietro ('Saint Peter's Island'), approximately 7 kilometres (4 miles) off the southwestern coast of mainland Sardinia. It has 5,851 inhabitants. It is one of I Borghi più belli d'Italia ('The most beautiful villages of Italy').

== History ==
According to a legend, a local church (Chiesa dei Novelli Innocenti) was founded in the early 14th century in honour of hundreds of participants to the so-called Children's Crusade of 1212 who perished in a shipwreck just off the island on their way to North Africa during a gale. The church, called Chiesa dei Novelli Innocenti and is located within the town perimeter, is not currently used as a church (only one time in the year); it was the only evident remainder of building found at the time of colonization in 1739.

Carloforte was founded in the 18th century by around 30 families of coral fishers, descendants of people from the Ligurian town of Pegli, near Genoa, who had left their hometown in 1541, and had settled in the island of Tabarka, off the coast of Tunisia, to fish for coral. After centuries, the coral in that area was exhausted and the families, while setting off back to Italy, found there was plenty of coral in the sea off the Sardinian west coast. They asked the King of Piedmont-Sardinia Charles Emmanuel III for permission to settle down on the once uninhabited San Pietro Island instead. When he granted them permission, the island was colonized (1739); the name Carloforte ("Charles the Strong", but also the "Carlo's Fort") was given to the town they then proceeded to found, in the Piedmontese king's honour. To this day, Carloforte maintains strong cultural ties with the mainland towns of Pegli and Genoa: the population still speaks a variety of Ligurian language called tabarchìn (or tabarchino, in Italian), separate from both Italian and Sardinian, which is used even by most children and taught in the island's schools.

== Demographics ==
As of 2026, the population is 5,851, of which 49.2% are male, and 50.8% are female. Minors make up 10.3% of the population, and seniors make up 32.8%.

Historical population

Year	Pop.	±%
1861	3,745	—
1871	4,895	+30.7%
1881	6,219	+27.0%
1901	7,693	+23.7%
1911	8,031	+4.4%
1921	8,055	+0.3%
1931	8,100	+0.6%
1936	8,030	−0.9%

Year	Pop.	±%
1951	7,322	−8.8%
1961	7,275	−0.6%
1971	6,849	−5.9%
1981	6,625	−3.3%
1991	6,629	+0.1%
2001	6,444	−2.8%
2011	6,301	−2.2%
2021	5,983	−5.0%

Source: ISTAT

=== Immigration ===
As of 2025, immigrants make up 3.9% of the total population. The 5 largest foreign countries of birth are Germany, France, Romania, Spain, and Switzerland.

== Economy ==
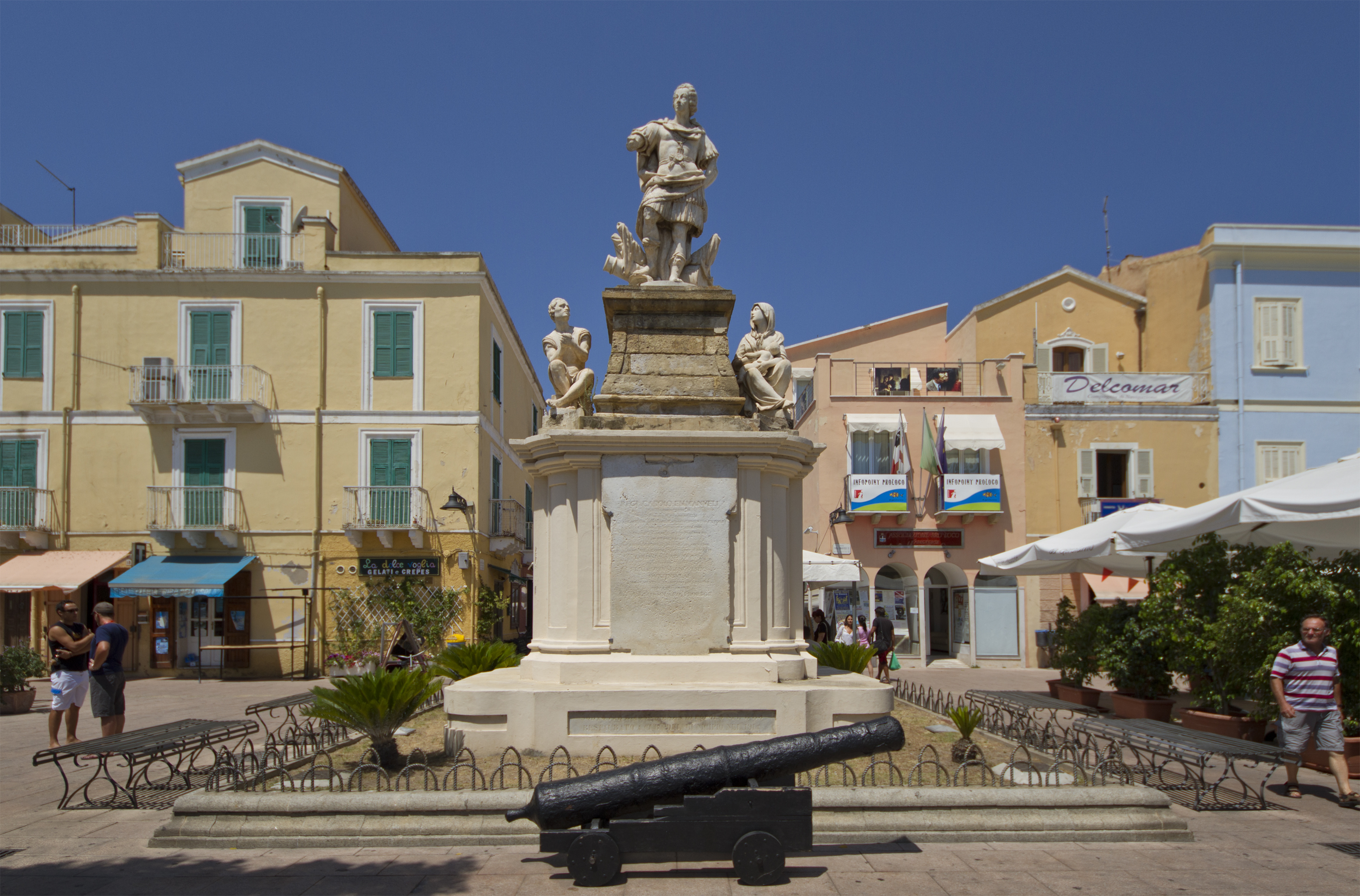
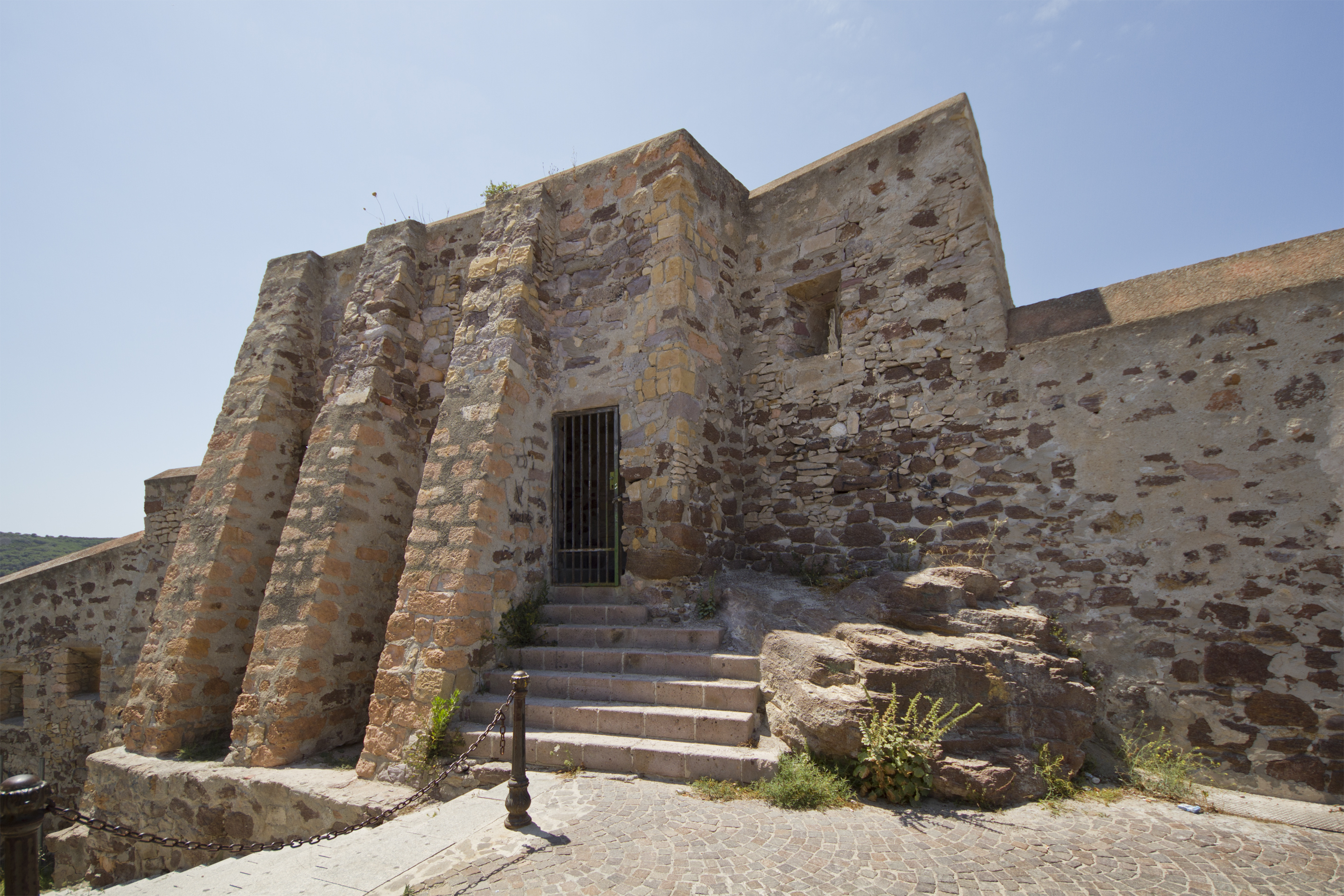
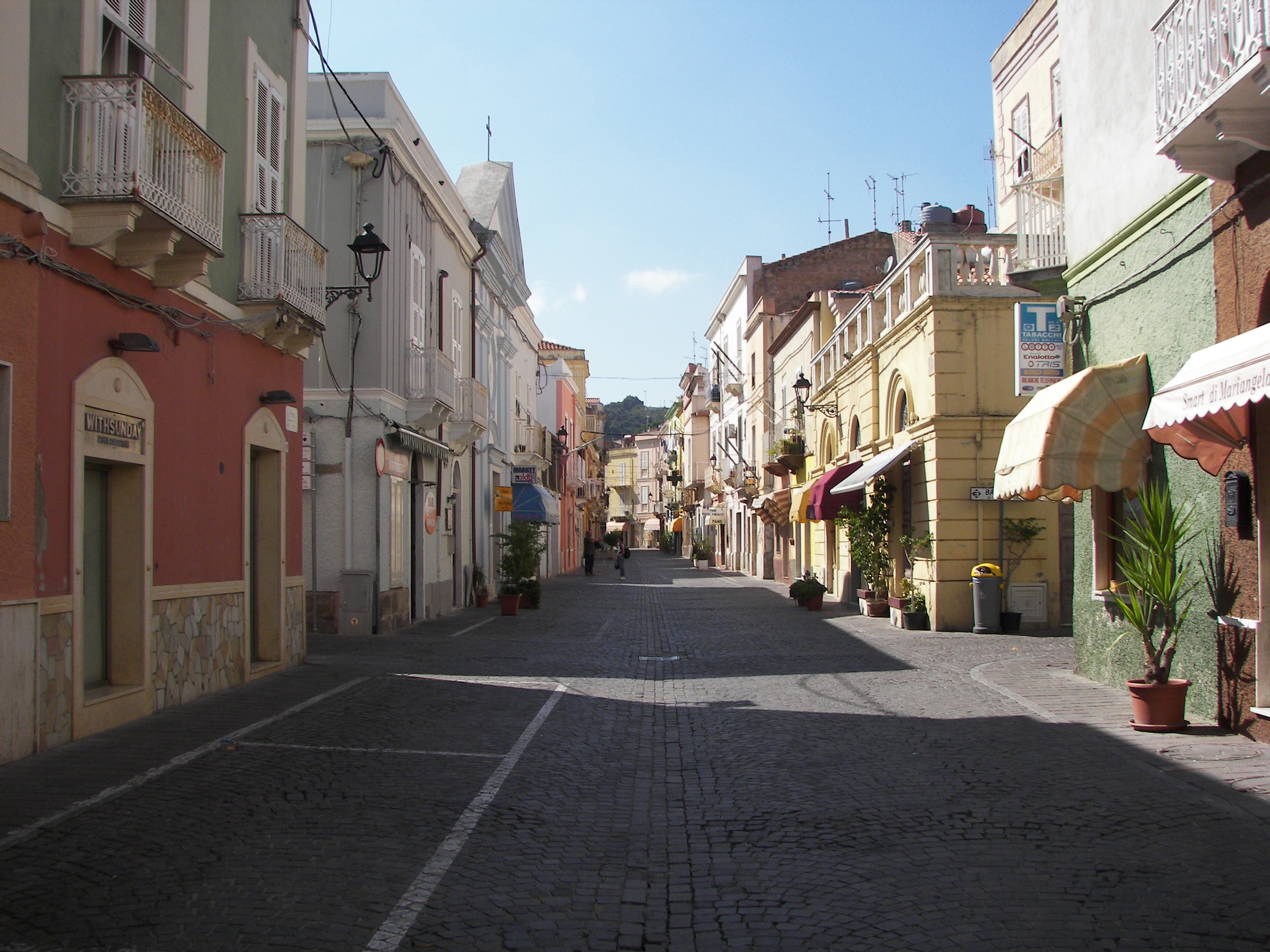
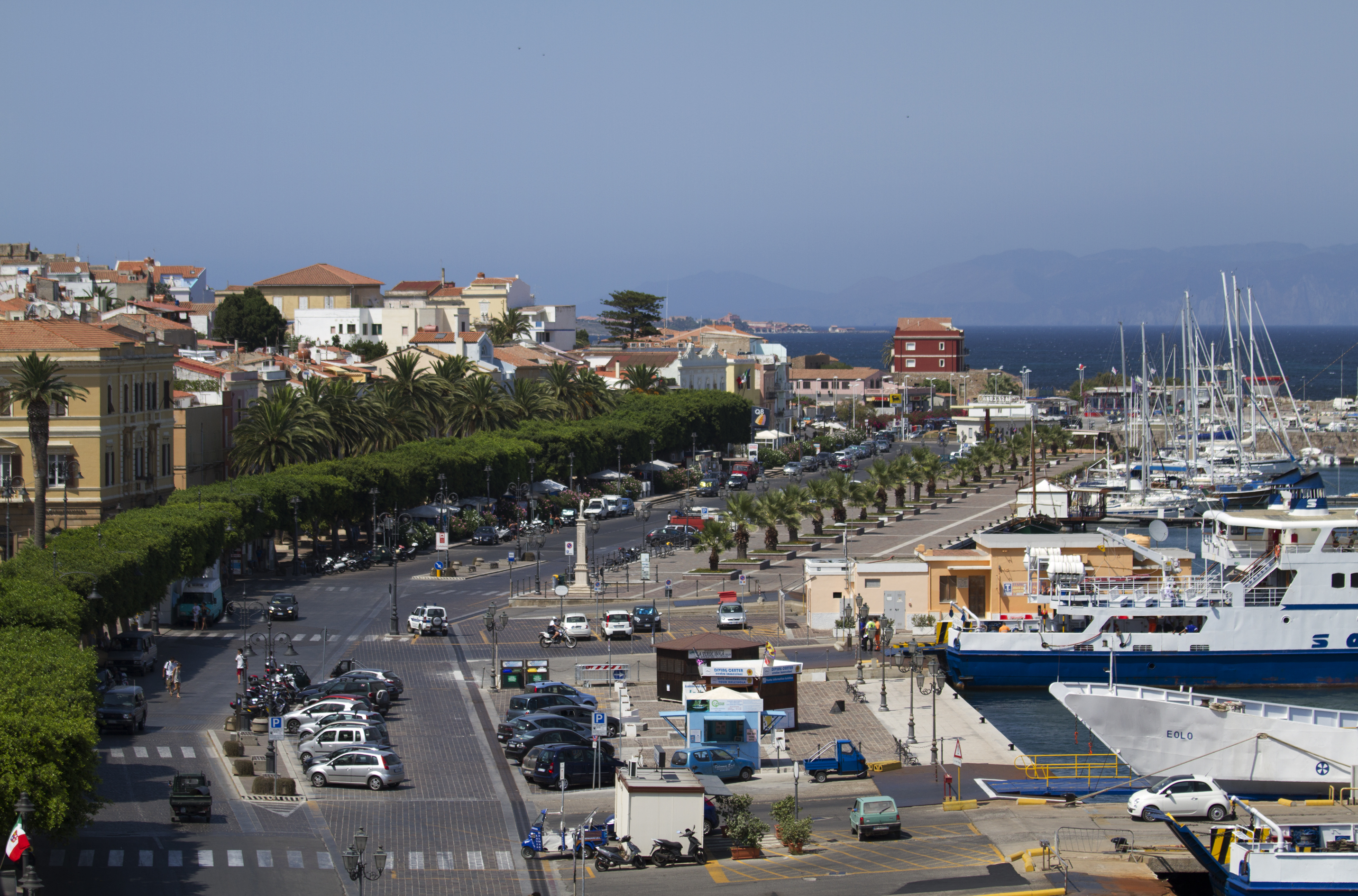
Clockwise from top:
- Monument to Charles Emmanuel III, founder of the fort and settlement on San Pietro Island
- Street in Carloforte
- Harbor of Carloforte
- Fort Santa Catarina

Modern-day Carloforte's principal sources of revenue are fishing, tourism, and remittances from the many merchant mariners around the world who hail from Carloforte. Boasting several beaches, both rocky and sandy, the town is a summer tourist destination. On the other side of the island from Carloforte is Capo Sandalo Lighthouse (functioning, now automated). Locally, it is known simply as Il Faro. The structure dates back to the 1880s.

Carloforte has a long-standing tradition of wooden boatbuilding. Locally built traditional lateen sail fishing boats (luggers) can be spotted in the harbour.

To the north of the town (at the La Punta locale) is a collection of buildings that housed the former communally owned tuna-processing plant linked to the once-vibrant tuna fishing tonnare industry on the island. Some of the buildings have undergone renovation to some extent and now contain a wind-surfing school and a privately owned tuna processing business. Some of the buildings are still in ruins, but they remain of great architectural interest.

== Education ==
The town hosts a maritime high school.

== Transport ==
Ferry services operated by Delcomar connect the port of Carloforte with the Sardinian mainland at Portovesme as well as Calasetta, a similar fishing port on Sant'Antioco Island hosting another community of Tabarchini.

== Twin towns – sister cities ==
- Alicante, Spain
- Tabarca, Spain
- Metropolitan City of Genoa, Italy
- Pegli, Italy
- Camogli, Italy
- Montecchio Maggiore, Italy from 2009
