= Maritime republics =

Sea-based city-states on the Italian peninsula and Dalmatia during the Middle Ages

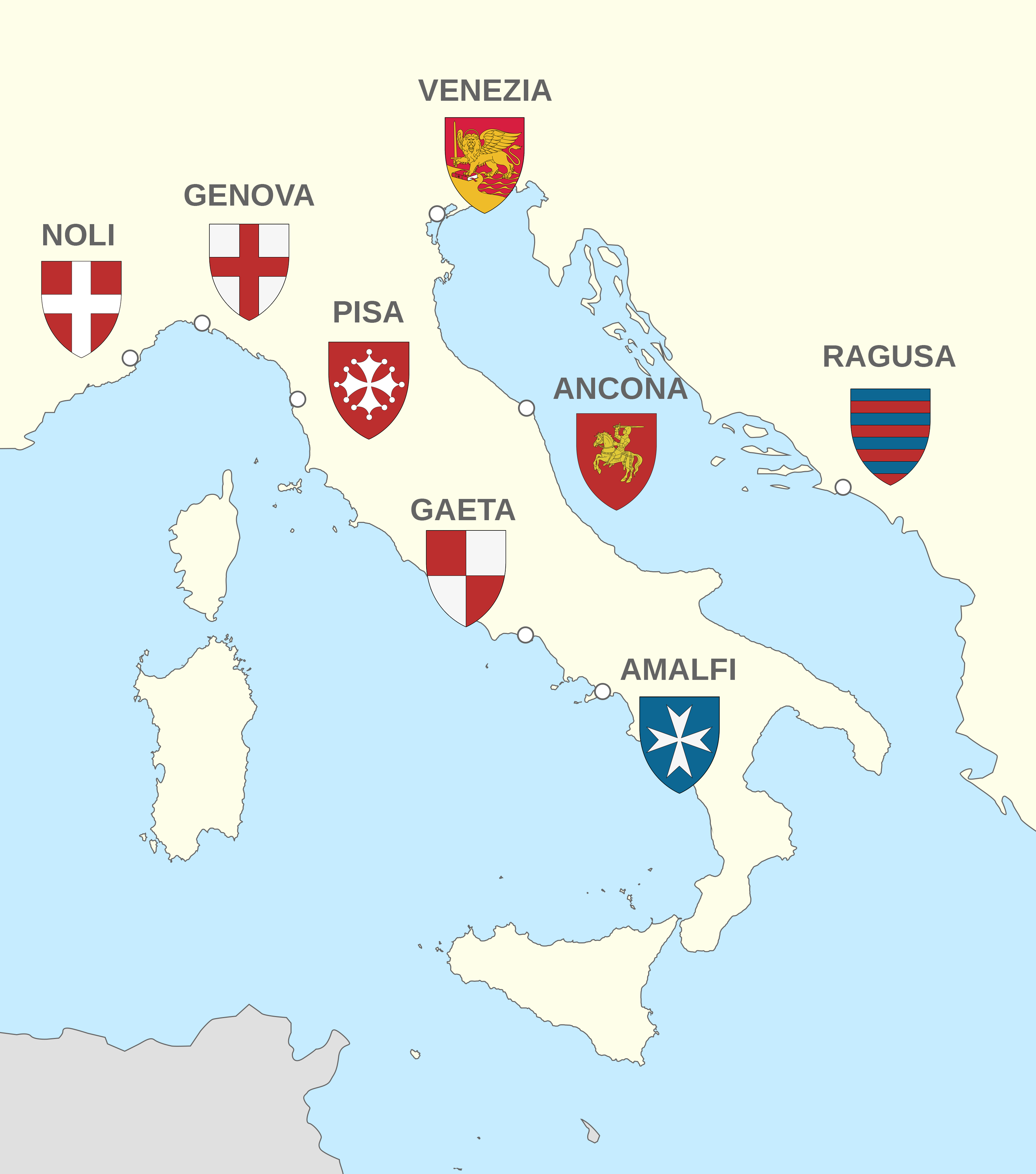
A map with the locations and coats of arms of the maritime republics of medieval Italy and Croatia: Venice, Genoa, Amalfi, Pisa, Noli, Ancona, Ragusa, Gaeta.

The maritime republics (Italian: repubbliche marinare), also called merchant republics (Italian: repubbliche mercantili), were Italian thalassocratic states which, starting from the Middle Ages, enjoyed political autonomy and economic prosperity brought about by their maritime activities. The term, coined during the 19th century, generally refers to four Italian cities, whose coats of arms have been shown since 1947 on the flags of the Italian Navy and the Italian Merchant Navy: Amalfi, Genoa, Pisa, and Venice. In addition to the four best known cities, Ancona, Gaeta, Noli, and, in Dalmatia, Ragusa, are also considered maritime republics; in certain historical periods, they had no secondary importance compared to some of the better known cities.

Uniformly scattered across the Italian peninsula, the maritime republics were important not only for the history of navigation and commerce: in addition to precious goods otherwise unobtainable in Europe, new artistic ideas and news concerning distant countries also spread. From the 10th century, they built fleets of ships both for their own protection and to support extensive trade networks across the Mediterranean, giving them an essential role in reestablishing contacts between Europe, Asia, and Africa, which had been interrupted during the early Middle Ages. They also had an essential role in the Crusades and produced renowned explorers and navigators such as Marco Polo and Christopher Columbus.

Over the centuries, the maritime republics — both the best known and the lesser known but not always less important — experienced fluctuating fortunes. In the 9th and 10th centuries, this phenomenon began with Amalfi and Gaeta, which soon reached their heyday. Meanwhile, Venice began its gradual ascent, while the other cities were still experiencing the long gestation that would lead them to their autonomy and to follow up on their seafaring vocation. After the 11th century, Amalfi and Gaeta declined rapidly, while Genoa and Venice became the most powerful republics.

Pisa followed and experienced its most flourishing period in the 13th century, and Ancona and Ragusa allied to resist Venetian power. Following the 14th century, while Pisa declined to the point of losing its autonomy, Venice and Genoa continued to dominate navigation, followed by Ragusa and Ancona, which experienced their golden age in the 15th century. In the 16th century, with Ancona's loss of autonomy, only the republics of Venice, Genoa, and Ragusa remained, which still experienced great moments of splendor until the mid-17th century, followed by over a century of slow decline that ended with the Napoleonic invasion.

== Conceptualization of maritime republics ==
=== Pre-unification ===
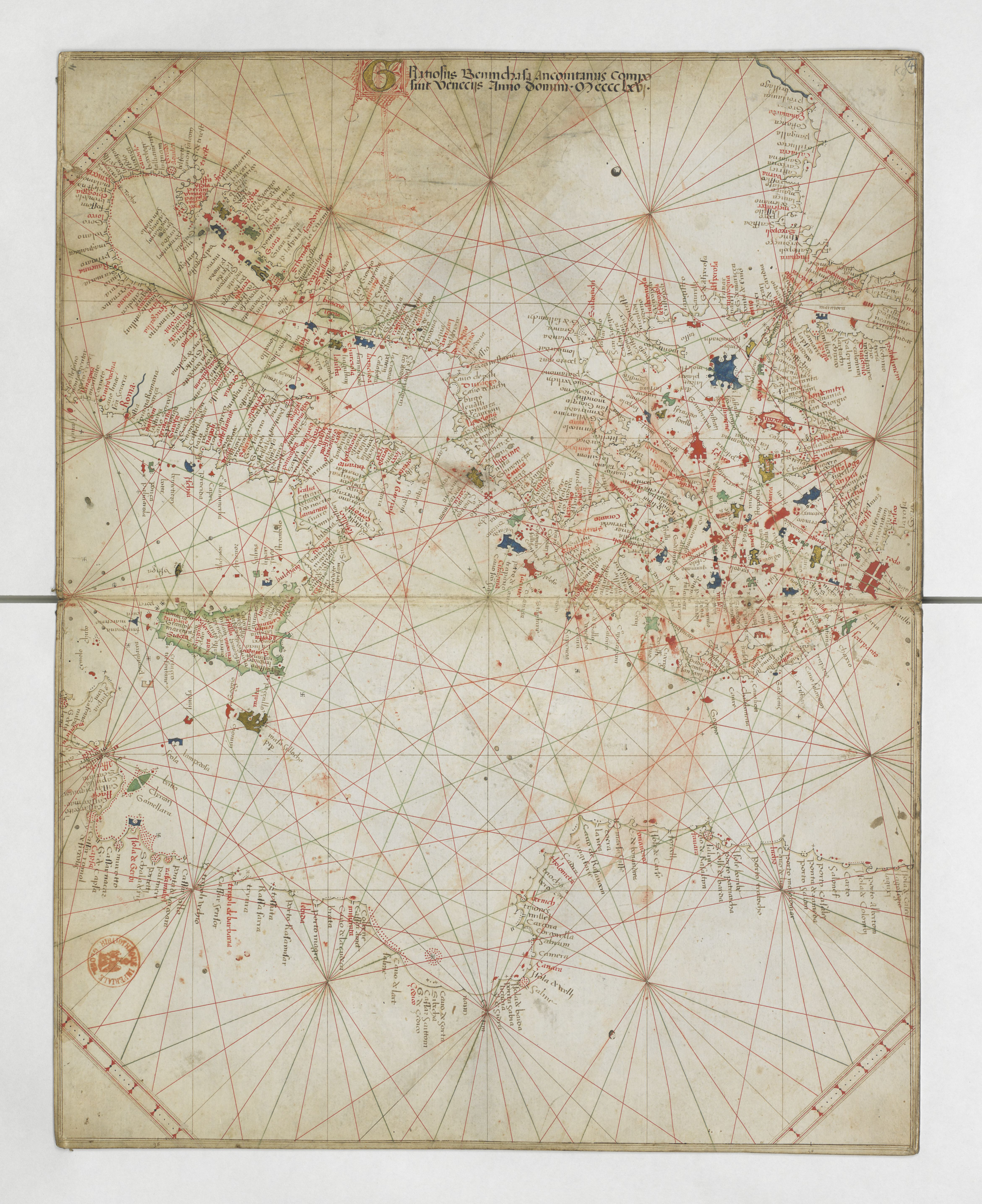
A nautical chart of the Eastern Mediterranean, by Grazioso Benincasa (1466), of Ancona's cartographic school

The expression maritime republics was coined by nineteenth-century historiography, almost coinciding with the end of the last of them: none of these states had ever defined itself as a maritime republic. Swiss historian Jean Charles Léonard de Sismondi introduced the expression and focused on the corresponding concept in his 1807 work History of the Italian Republics of the Middle Centuries. In Sismondi's text, the maritime republics were seen as cities dedicated above all to fighting each other over issues related to their commercial expansion, unlike the medieval communes, which instead fought together against the Empire courageously defending their freedom.

In Italy, up until the unification, this determined a negative judgment on the maritime cities, because their history of mutual struggles appeared in stark contrast to the spirit of the Risorgimento. The only exception was considered the very difficult and finally victorious resistance of Ancona in the siege of 1173, which the city obtained against the imperial troops of Federico Barbarossa; that victory entered the national imagination as an anticipation of the struggles of Italian patriots against foreign rulers. The episode, however, was included in the municipal epic and not in the seafaring one.

=== Post-unification ===
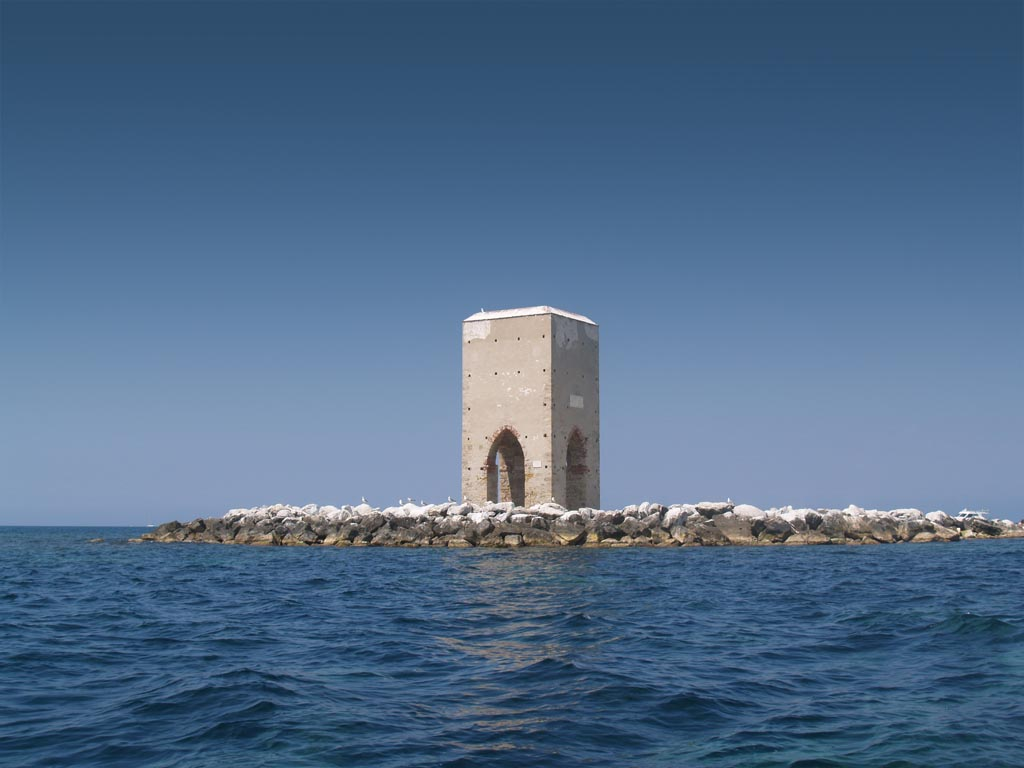
Meloria, the theatre of the 1284 battle which saw Genoa's victory over Pisa

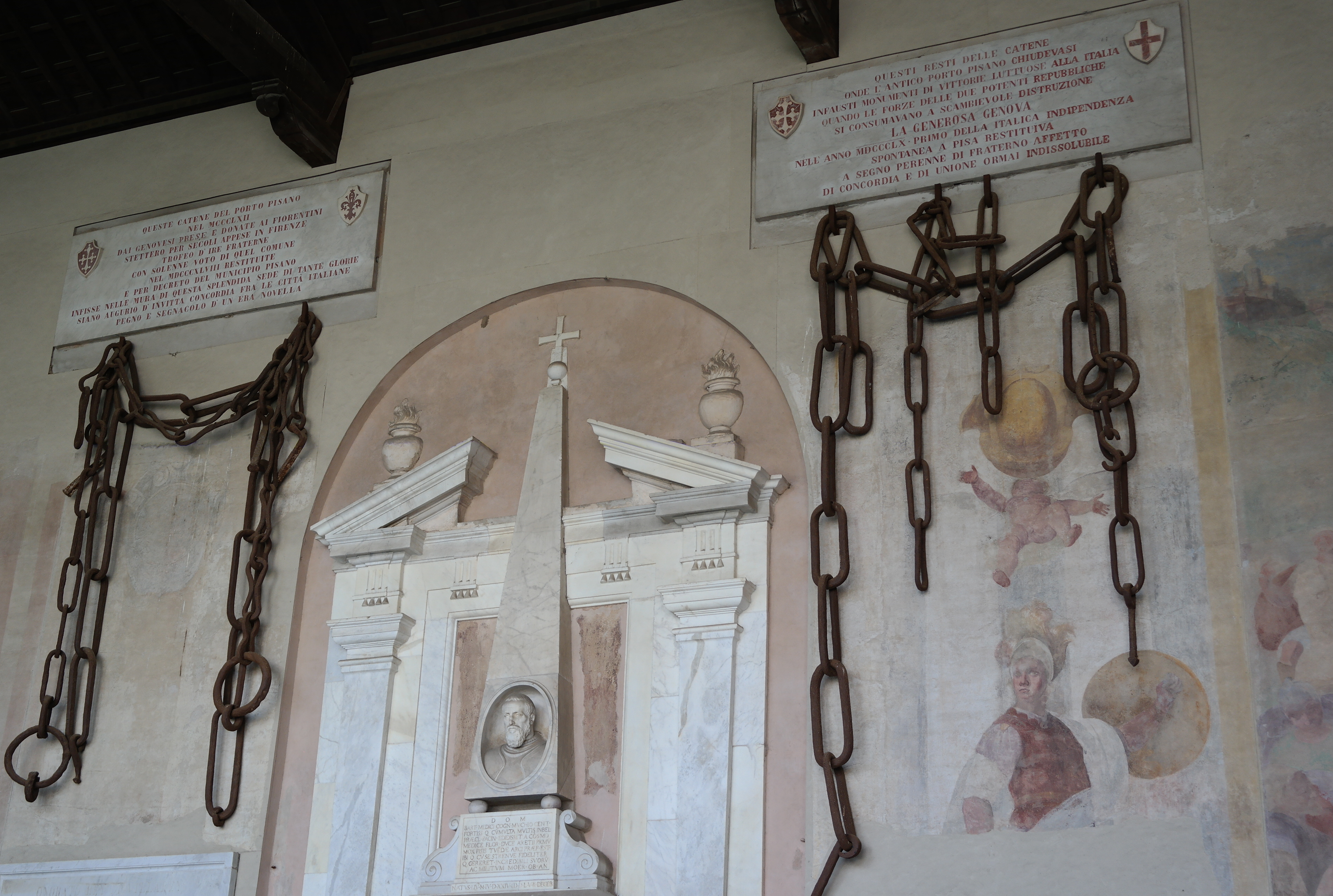
The chains of the port of Pisa, removed by the Genoese after the battle of Meloria and returned as a sign of Italian brotherhood in two different moments of the Risorgimento: in 1848 and in 1860

In the first decades after Italian unification, post-Risorgimento patriotism fueled a rediscovery of the Middle Ages linked to a romantic nationalism, in particular to those aspects that seemed to prefigure national glory and the struggle for independence. The phenomenon of the "maritime republics" was then reinterpreted, freed from negative prejudice and placed side by side with the glorious history of the medieval communes; thus it also established itself on a popular level.

Celebrating history, the Italian maritime cities did not consider their mutual struggles so much as their common seafaring enterprise. In the post-unification cultural climate, it was considered essential for the formation of the modern Italian people to remember that within the maritime republics and municipalities arose the industriousness that inaugurated the new civilization.

In the Regia Marina, established immediately after the achievement of national unity and therefore only in 1861, there were heated contrasts between the various pre-unification navies: Sardinian, Tuscan, papal and Neapolitan. The exaltation of the seafaring spirit that united the maritime republics made it possible to highlight a common historical basis and overcome divisions. This necessitated the removal of ancient rivalries; in this regard, of great significance was the return of chains that had closed Pisa's port, which had been stolen by Genoa during the medieval fights. Their return in 1860 was a sign of fraternal affection and of the now indissoluble union between the two cities, as can be read on the plaque affixed after the return.

In 1860, the study of the maritime republics as a unitary phenomenon was introduced in the school curriculum, further popularizing the concept. From that year forward, the high school program required students to address the "causes of the rapid resurgence of Italian maritime trade - Amalfi, Venice, Genoa, Ancona, Pisa" and the "Settlement of the great Italian Navy". For the second class, at the beginning of the year, the teacher was arranged to recall the period in which the maritime republics grew and flourished. Every time the school programs were renewed, the study of the phenomenon of the maritime republics was always confirmed.

In 1875, the ministerial indication was followed up in the history program for technical institutes. That year, Carlo O. Galli claimed in a scholastic textbook that "among all the peoples of Europe, the one who in the Middle Ages rose first to great power" in navigation was the Italian people, and he attributed this to the independence enjoyed by "the maritime republics of Italy, among which Amalfi, Pisa, Genoa, Ancona, Venice, Naples and Gaeta deserve more mention".

In 1895, the sailor Augusto Vittorio Vecchi, founder of the Italian Naval League and better known as a writer under the pseudonym Jack la Bolina, wrote General History of the Navy, which was widely circulated and described the military exploits of the maritime cities in chronological order of origin and decay, from Amalfi to Pisa, Genoa and Ancona to Venice. In 1899, historian Camillo Manfroni wrote on Italy's maritime history, identifying the period of the maritime republics as that history's most glorious phase. At the end of the 19th century, the history of the maritime republics was thus consolidated and consigned to the 20th century.

=== 20th century ===
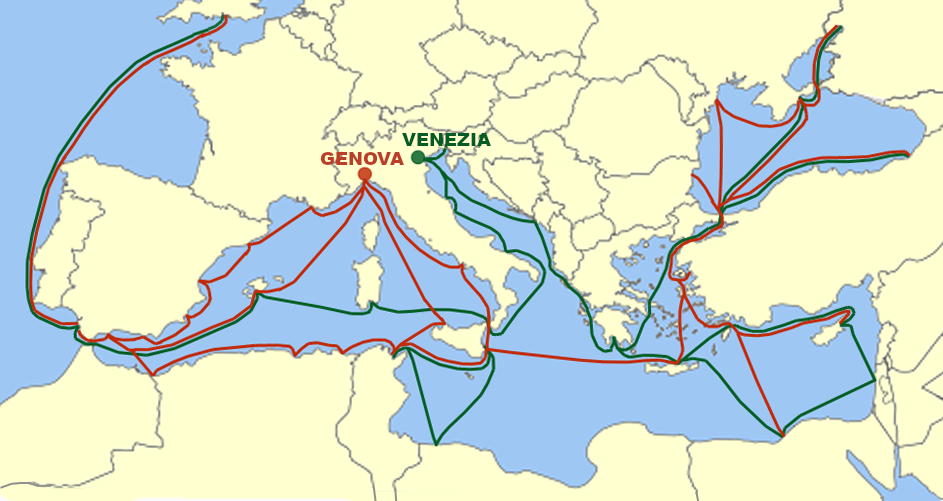
Left: the flag of the Italian Navy. Clockwise, from upper left: the coat of arms of Venice, Genoa, Pisa and Amalfi.
Right: trade routes, colonies of Genoa and Venice.

The number "four", which still often occurs today associated with maritime republics, is, as can be seen, not original: the short list of maritime republics was limited to two (Genoa and Venice) or three cities (Genoa, Venice and Pisa); the long list included Genoa, Venice, Pisa, Ancona, Amalfi and Gaeta.

Crucial for the diffusion of the list of four maritime republics was a publication by Captain Umberto Moretti, who was tasked by the Royal Navy in 1904 with documenting the maritime history of Amalfi. The volume was released under the significant title The First Maritime Republic of Italy. From that moment on, the name of Amalfi definitively joined that of the other republics in the short list, shifting the imbalance towards the centre-north of the country with its presence.

In the 1930s, a list made up of four names was consolidated: Amalfi, Pisa, Genoa and Venice. This finally led to the inclusion of the symbols of the four cities in the Italian Navy's flag. The flag, approved in 1941, would not be adopted until 1947 due to World War II. In 1955, the four cities represented in the navy flag inspired the Regatta of the Historical Marine Republics.

Armando Lodolini's 1967 book The Republics of the Sea resumed the previous long list of maritime republics: Venice, Genoa, Pisa, Ancona, Gaeta, and the Dalmatian Ragusa. Noli's status as a small maritime republic would only come into focus in later decades after previously being affirmed only at an academic level.

In 2000, Italian president Carlo Azeglio Ciampi summed up the maritime republics' historic role with these words:

... The Italy of the maritime republics ... reopened the ways of the world to Europe.

— Carlo Azeglio Ciampi

== Description ==
=== Characteristics ===
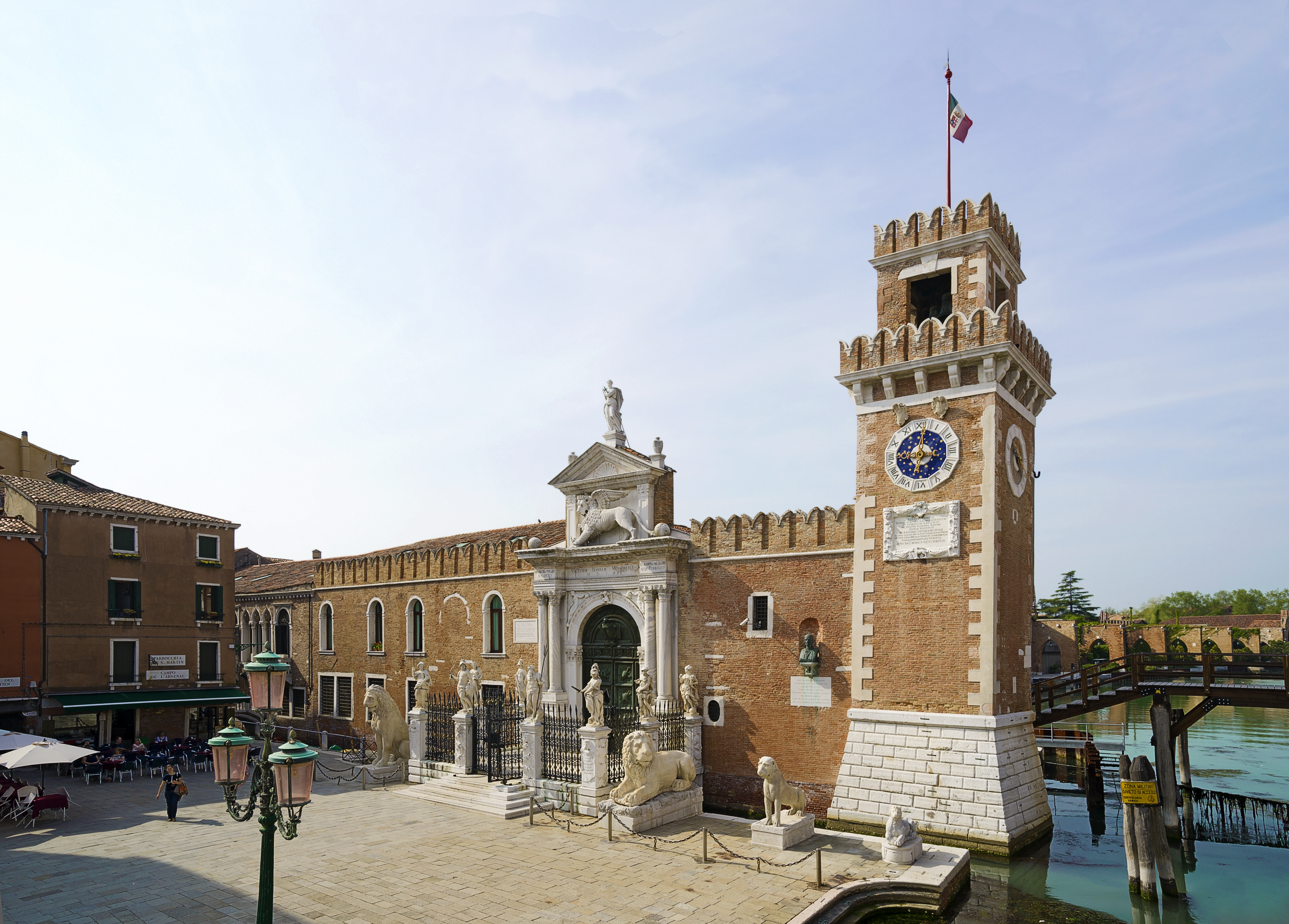
The maritime republics built the ships they needed in their own arsenals. Pictured is the Venetian Arsenal.

Elements that characterized a maritime republic were:

- Independence (de jure or de facto)
- Autonomy, economics, politics, and culture essentially based on navigation and maritime trade
- Possession of a fleet of ships, built in its own arsenal
- Establishment of a city-state that would eventually expand further
- Presence of warehouses and consuls in Mediterranean ports
- Presence of foreign warehouses and consuls in its own port
- Use of its own currency accepted throughout the Mediterranean and its own maritime laws
- Republican government
- Participation in the Crusades and/or the crackdown on piracy

=== Origins, affirmation and duration ===
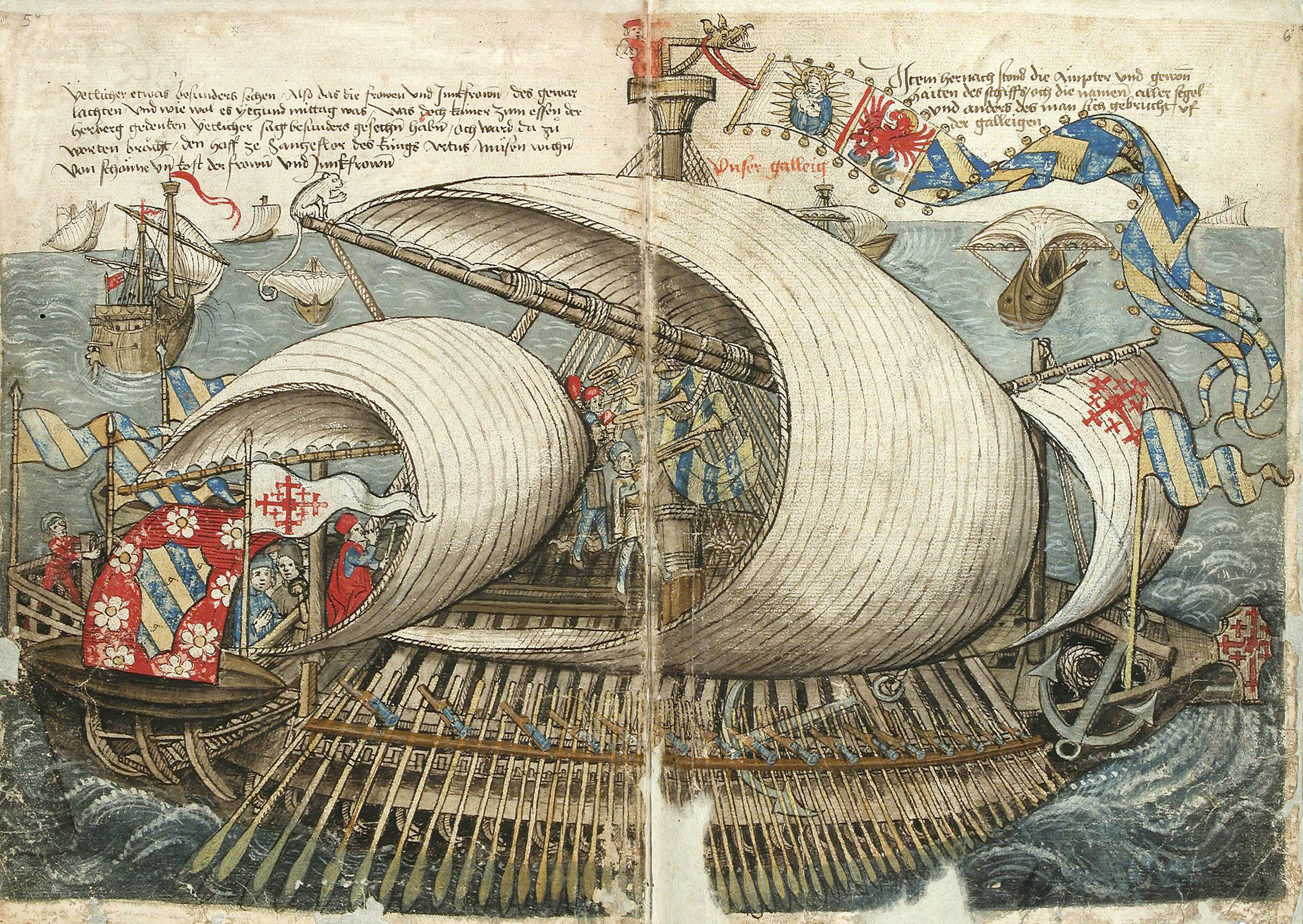
A galley carrying pilgrims to the Holy Land - from the travelogue of Conrad Grünenberg

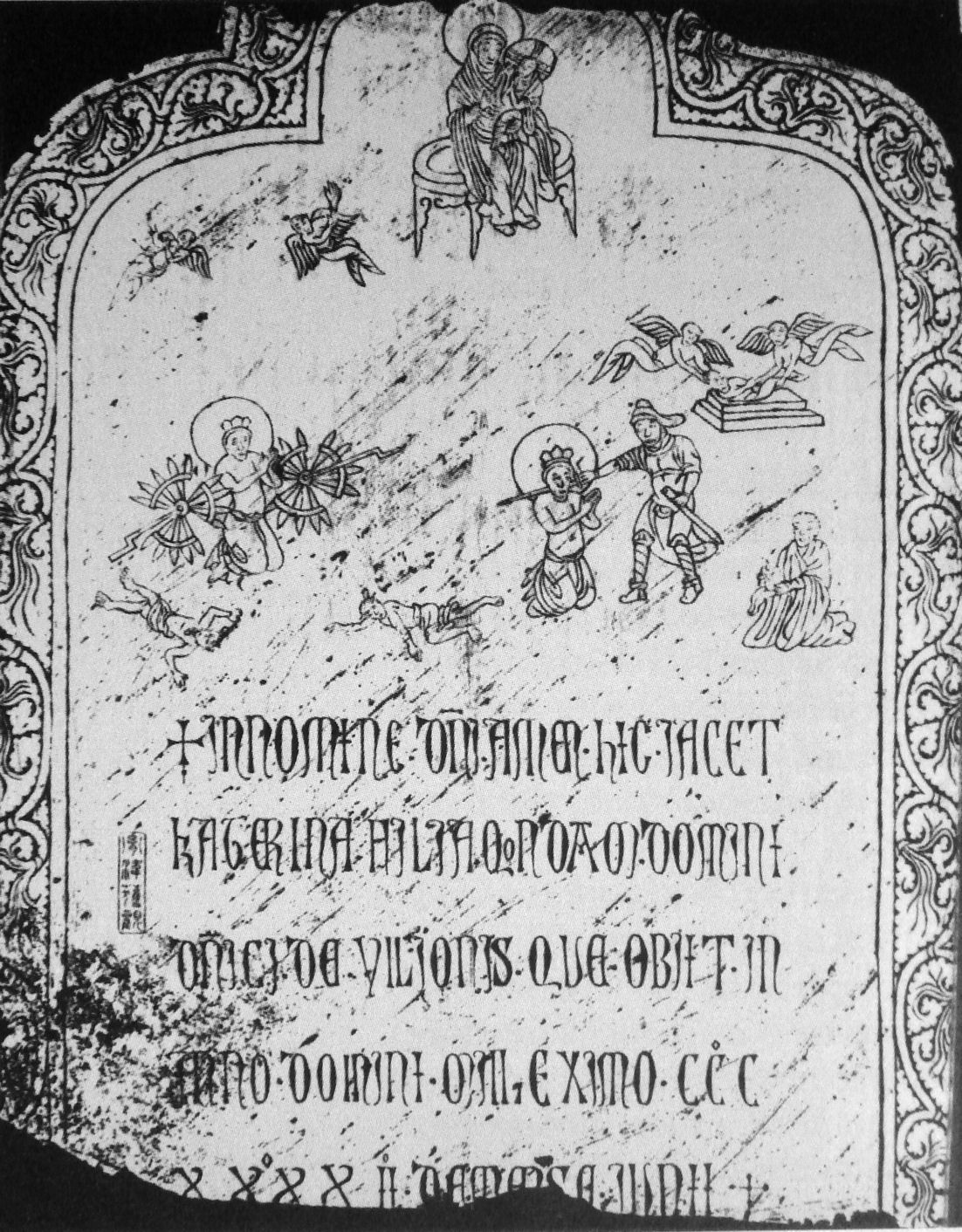
Illustration of the 1342 tombstone of Caterina Vilioni (lat:Vilionis), member of a Venetian or Genoese trading family in Yangzhou

The economic recovery that took place in Europe starting with the 9th century, combined with hazardous mainland trading routes, enabled the development of major commercial routes along the Mediterranean coast. The growing autonomy acquired by some coastal cities gave them a leading role in this development. As many as six of these cities — Amalfi, Venice, Gaeta, Genoa, Ancona, and Ragusa — began their own history of autonomy and trade after being almost destroyed by terrible looting, or were founded by refugees from devastated lands.

These cities, exposed to pirate raids and neglected by central powers, organized their own defence autonomously, coupling the exercise of maritime trade with that of their armed protection. Thus, in the 9th, 10th, and 11th centuries, they were able to go on the offensive, obtaining numerous victories over the Saracens, starting with the historic Battle of Ostia in 849. The traffic of these cities reached Africa and Asia, effectively inserting itself between the Byzantine and Islamic maritime powers, with which a complex relationship of competition and collaboration was established for the control of the Mediterranean routes.

Each of the cities was favored by its geographical position, far from the main routes of passage of the armies and protected by mountains or lagoons, which isolated it and allowed it to devote itself undisturbed to maritime traffic. This led to a gradual administrative autonomy and, in some cases, to total independence from the central powers, which for some time were no longer able to control the peripheral provinces: the Byzantine Empire, the Holy Roman Empire, and the Papal States.

The forms of independence that were created in these cities were varied, and the modern approach to considering political relations, which clearly distinguishes between administrative autonomy and political freedom, makes it difficult to orient itself among them. For this reason, in the table below there are two dates relating to independence: one refers to the de facto freedom acquired, the other to that of law.

City	Coat of arms	Flag	Motto, currency and maritime code	Start of independence	Preceding state	End of independence	Duration of independence	Succeeding state
Amalfi			motto: Descendit ex patribus romanorum currency: tarì code: Amalfian Laws (11th century)	de facto: 839 (acquisition of liberty)	Byzantine Empire	1131 (following the war between Pope Innocent II and Roger II of Sicily)	de facto: 3 centuries	Kingdom of Sicily
Genoa			mottos: Respublica superiorem non recognoscens; Pe Zena e pe San Zòrzo; Griphus ut has angit, sic hostes Ianua frangit. currency: genovino code: Regulae et ordinamenta officii gazariae (1441)	de facto: 958 (with the concession of Berengar II of Italy); de jure: 1096 (with the Compagna Communis)	Kingdom of Italy	1797 (with the Italian Campaign)	de facto: 8 centuries de jure: 7 centuries	Ligurian Republic
Pisa			motto: Urbis me dignum pisane noscite signum currency: aquilino or grosso pisano codes: Constitutum usus (1160) and Breve curia maris (1297)	de facto: 11th century (gradual acquisition of freedom)	Kingdom of Italy	1406 (military occupation of Florence)	de facto: 4 centuries de jure: 3 centuries	Republic of Florence
Venice		centro	mottos: Pax tibi, Marce, evangelista meus; Viva San Marco! currency: sequin or ducat code: Capitolare nauticum (1225)	de facto: acquired gradually after the Exarchate of Ravenna's collapse in 751, 840 (Pactum Lotharii), 1122-1126 (Venetian-Byzantine War) de jure: 1141-1143 (Commune of Venice)	Byzantine Empire	1797 (Treaty of Campo Formio)	de facto: circa 9 centuries de jure: 6.5 centuries	Archduchy of Austria
Ancona			motti: Ancon dorica civitas fidei currency: agontano code: Statutes of the Sea (1387)	de facto: 11th century (gradual acquisition of liberty)	Kingdom of Italy; Papal States	1532 (papal military occupation)	de facto: 5 centuries	Papal States
Gaeta			currency: follaro code: part of the Statutes of Gaeta (1356)	de facto: 839 (acquisition of liberty)	Byzantine Empire	1140 (annexation to the Norman Kingdom)	de facto: 3 centuries	Kingdom of Sicily
Noli			code: Statutes of Noli (12th century)	de facto: 1192 (birth of the free commune); de jure: 1196 (confirmation of rights by Henry VI)	Kingdom of Italy	15th century (end of maritime activities); 1797 (end of the republic, with the Italian Campaign)	maritime republic: 2 centuries republic: 6 centuries	Ligurian Republic
Ragusa	senza_cornice		motto: Non bene pro toto libertas venditur auro currency: various denominations code: two volumes of the Liber Statutorum (1272)	de facto: 11th century (gradual acquisition of freedom)	Byzantine Empire	1808 (with the Peace of Pressburg)	de facto: 8 centuries	Illyrian Provinces of the First French Empire

From an institutional point of view, in line with their municipal origins, the maritime cities were oligarchic republics, generally governed, in a more or less declared manner, by the main merchant families. The governments were therefore an expression of the merchant class, which constituted the backbone of their power. For this reason, these cities are sometimes referred to with the more generic term of "merchant republic".

They were endowed with an articulated system of magistracies, with sometimes complementary, sometimes overlapping competences, which over the centuries showed a decided tendency to change - not without a certain degree of instability - and to centralize power. Thus the government became the privilege of the merchant nobility in Venice (from 1297) and the duke in Amalfi (from 945). Even Gaeta, which never had a republican order, and Amalfi, which became a duchy in 945, are also called maritime republics, as the term republic should not be understood in its modern meaning: until Machiavelli and Kant, "republic" was synonymous with "State", and was not opposed to monarchy.

The Crusades offered the opportunity to expand trade. Amalfi, Genoa, Venice, Pisa, Ancona and Ragusa were already engaged in trade with the Levant, but with the Crusades thousands of inhabitants of the seaside cities poured into the East, creating warehouses, colonies and commercial establishments. They exercised great political influence at the local level: Italian merchants set up trade associations in their business centers with the aim of obtaining jurisdictional, fiscal and customs privileges from foreign governments.

Only Venice, Genoa and Pisa had territorial expansion overseas, i.e. they possessed large regions and numerous islands along the Mediterranean coasts. Genoa and Venice also came to dominate their entire region and part of the neighboring ones, becoming capitals of regional states. Venice was then the only one to dominate territories very far from the coast, up to occupying eastern Lombardy. Amalfi, Gaeta, Ancona, Ragusa and Noli, on the other hand, extended their dominion only to a part of the territory of their region, configuring themselves as city-states; however, all the republics had their own colonies and warehouses in the main Mediterranean ports, except Noli, which used those of the Genoese.

If the absence of a strong central authority had been the premise for the birth of the merchant republics, their end was vice versa due to the affirmation of a powerful centralized state. Usually independence could last as long as trade was able to ensure prosperity and wealth, but when these ceased, an economic decline was triggered, ending with the annexation, not necessarily violent, to a strong and organized state.

The longevity of the maritime republics was quite varied: Venice had the longest life, from the High Middle Ages to the Napoleonic era. Genoa and Ragusa had a very long history, from the 1000s to the Napoleonic Age. Noli lasted as long, but stopped trading as early as the 15th century. Pisa and Ancona had a long life, remaining independent until the Renaissance. Amalfi and Gaeta were the first to fall, being conquered by the Normans in the 12th century.

==== Number of maritime republics over the centuries ====
As highlighted in the following chronological table, the number of maritime republics has changed over the centuries, as follows:

- 9th–10th century: There are only three maritime republics, namely Amalfi, Gaeta and Venice.
- 11th century: By adding Ancona, Genoa, Pisa and Ragusa in the first decades, there are seven maritime republics; however, the century also saw the end of Amalfi's independence (1031) and the beginning of Noli's maritime history.
- 12th–14th century: With the end of Gaeta's independence (1137), there are six active maritime republics.
- 15th century: With Pisa's loss of independence and the end of Noli's maritime activity, four maritime republics remain, namely Ancona, Genoa, Ragusa, and Venice.
- 16th–18th century: With Ancona's loss of autonomy, the three longest-lived maritime republics remain active: Genoa, Ragusa and Venice.

==== Rises, golden periods, and declines ====
The following table compares the different duration of the maritime republics, their golden periods (indicated with more intense colours), and the periods of rise and decline (more or less light colours), determined by the wars won or lost, the commercial colonies in the Mediterranean, economic power, territorial possessions, and periods of temporary subjection to foreign powers. A different colour has been used for Noli to indicate the period of its incomplete independence.

The dates placed at the beginning and at the end of each time line respectively indicate the year in which autonomy began and ended. Any intermediate date indicates the year in which de facto independence passed to de jure independence. The notes refer to periods of temporary loss of freedom.

	0733	0766	0800	0833	0866	0900	0933	0966	1000	1033	1066	1100	1133	1166	1200	1233	1266	1300	1333	1366	1400	1433	1466	1500	1533	1566	1600	1633	1666	1700	1733	1766	1800
Amalfi				839	Wiki wiki					(Note: To the Principality of Salerno from 1039 to 1052)		1135																					
Genoa							958	Wiki wiki			1096								(Note: To the Visconti from 1353 to 1356)		(Note: To France from 1396 to 1409. To the Visconti from 1421 to 1436)	(Note: To France in 1460)	(Note: To Milan from 1466 to 1499)	(Note: To France from 1499 to 1506. After a period of extreme political weakness, Andrea Doria re-established autonomy in 1528.)						(Note: Austrian occupation in 1746, which ended following a popular revolt.)		1797	
Pisa									1000			1081								(Note: To the Visconti from 1399 to 1402)	1406			(Note: Briefly reconstituted from 1494 to 1509)									
Venice	(Note: With 751, the year of the Exarchate of Ravenna's collapse, the gradual process that led to Venice's independence began; in 840, the year of the Pactum Lotharii, Venice was already capable of autonomously signing agreements with the Empire.)			840									1143																			1797	
Ancona									1000										(Note: To the Malatestas from 1348 to 1353)	(Note: Under the direct rule of the Church from 1353 to 1383)				1532									
Gaeta				839	Wiki wiki					(Note: To the Principality of Capua from 1032 to 1039. To Salerno from 1040 to 1045. To Capua from 1058 to 1061.)	(Note: To Capua from 1068 to 1092)	1135																					
Noli														1192 1196	(Note: Protectorate of Genoa since 1202)						(Note: From the 15th century onward, the Republic of Noli ceased its maritime activities.)											1797	
Ragusa									1000						(Note: To Venice from 1205 to 1207, from 1211 to 1215, and from 1217 to 1230. To the Despotate of Epirus from 1230 to 1232.)	(Note: To Venice)			(Note: To Venice until 1358)														1808

=== Importance of the maritime republics ===
The Fra Mauro Map of the world in 1450, based extensively on the accounts of the Venetian merchant traveler Niccolò de' Conti

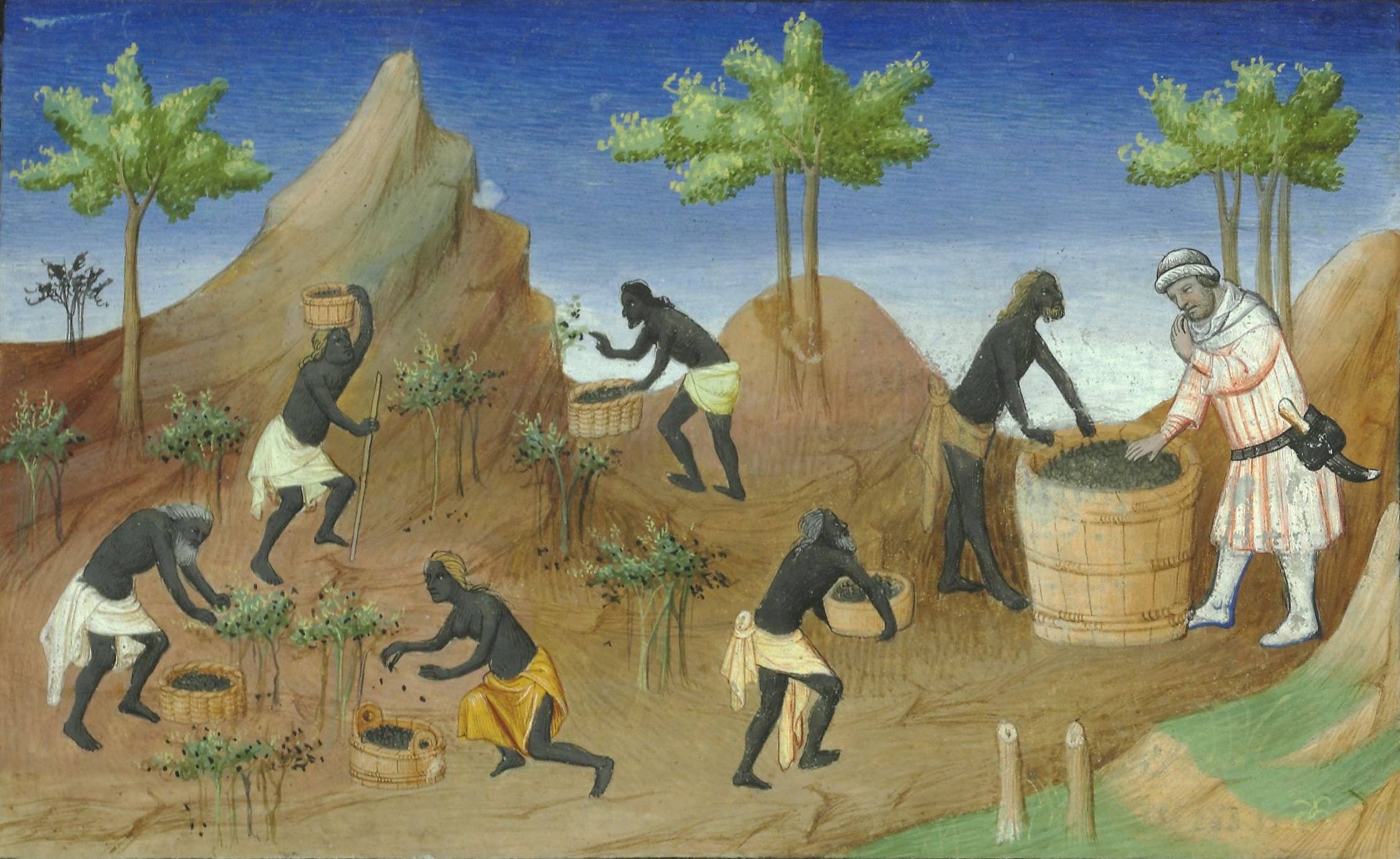
The harvesting of pepper, from the 15th century French edition of Marco Polo's The Travels of Marco Polo

The maritime republics reestablished contacts between Europe, Asia and Africa, which were almost interrupted after the fall of the Western Roman Empire; their history is intertwined both with the launch of European expansion towards the East and with the origins of modern capitalism as a mercantile and financial system. In these cities, gold coins, which had not been used for centuries, were minted, new exchange and accounting practices were developed, and thus international finance and commercial law were born.

Technological advances in navigation were also encouraged; important in this regard was the improvement and diffusion of the compass by the Amalfi people and the Venetian invention of the great galley. Navigation owes much to the maritime republics as regards nautical cartography: the maps of the 14th and 15th centuries that are still in use today all belong to the schools of Genoa, Venice, and Ancona.

From the East, the maritime republics imported a vast range of goods unobtainable in Europe, which they then resold in other cities of Italy and central and northern Europe, creating a commercial triangle between the Arab East, the Byzantine Empire, and Italy. Until the discovery of America they were therefore essential nodes of trade between Europe and the other continents.

Among the most important products were:

- Medicines: aloe vera, balsam, ginger, camphor, laudanum, cardamom, rhubarb, astragalus
- Spices: black pepper, cloves, nutmeg, cinnamon, white sugar
- Perfumes and odorous substances to burn: musk, mastic, sandalwood, incense, ambergris
- Dyes: indigo, alum, carmine, varnish
- Textiles: silk, Egyptian linen, sambe, brocade, velvet, damask, carpets
- Luxury products: gemstones, precious coral, pearls, ivory, porcelain, gold and silver threads

The maritime republics' great prosperity deriving from trade had a significant impact on the history of art, to the point that five of them (Amalfi, Genoa, Venice, Pisa and Ragusa) are today included in UNESCO's list of World Heritage Sites. Although an artistic current common to all of them and exclusive to them cannot be described, a characterizing trait was the mixture of elements of the various Mediterranean artistic traditions, mainly Byzantine, Islamic and Romanesque elements.

The modern Italian communities living in Greece, Turkey, Lebanon, Gibraltar, and Crimea descend, at least in part, from the colonies of the maritime republics, as well as the language island of the Tabarchino dialect in Sardinia and the extinct Italian community of Odesa.

== History of individual republics ==
=== Amalfi ===
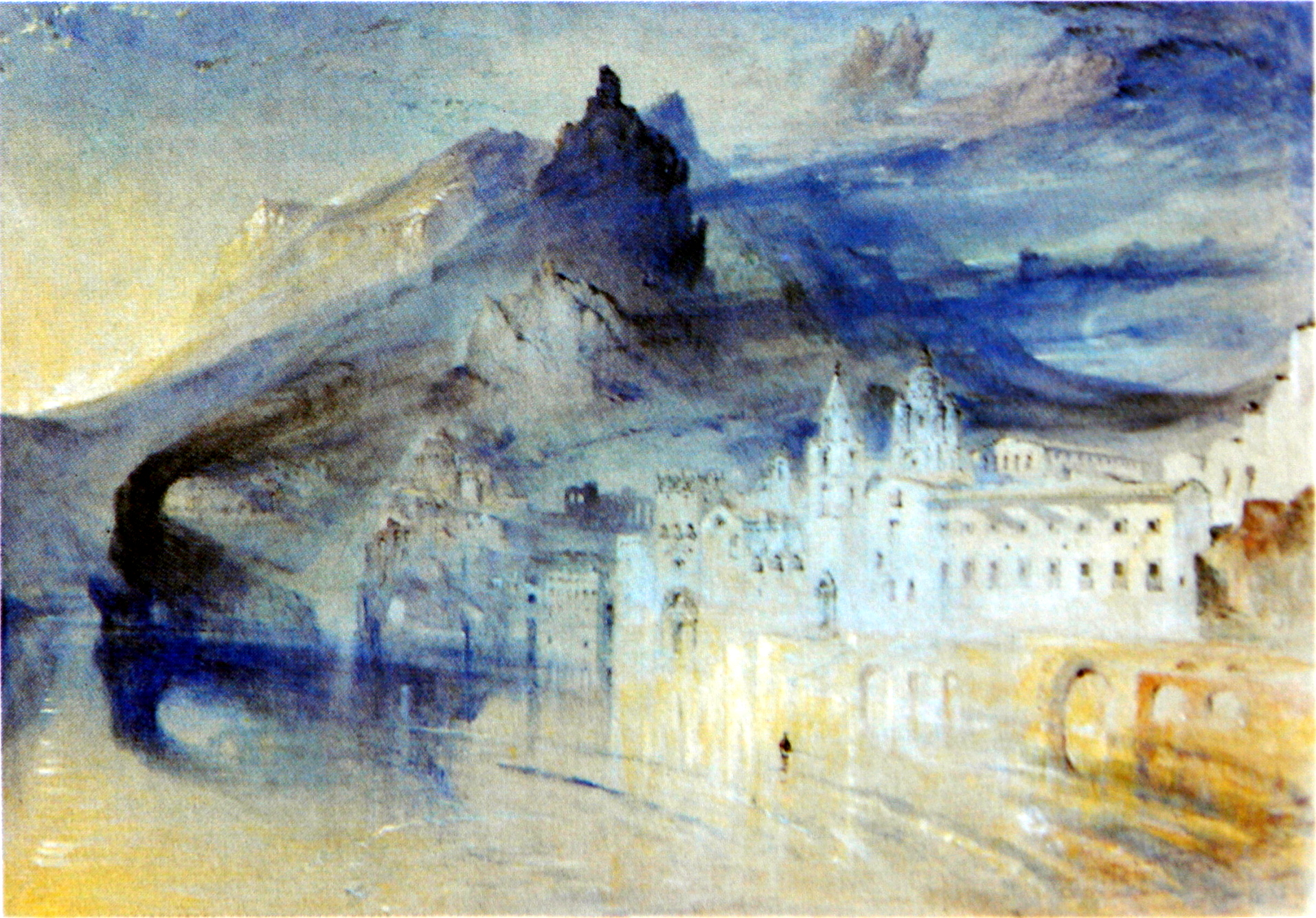
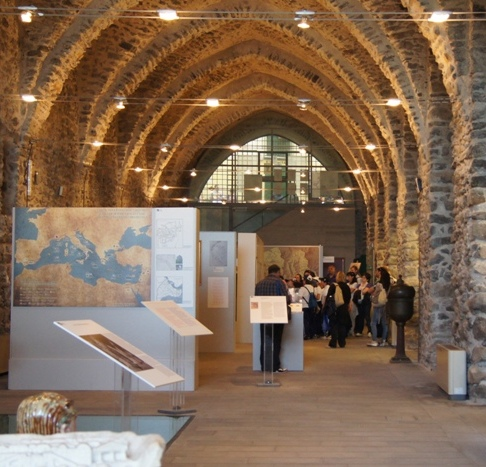
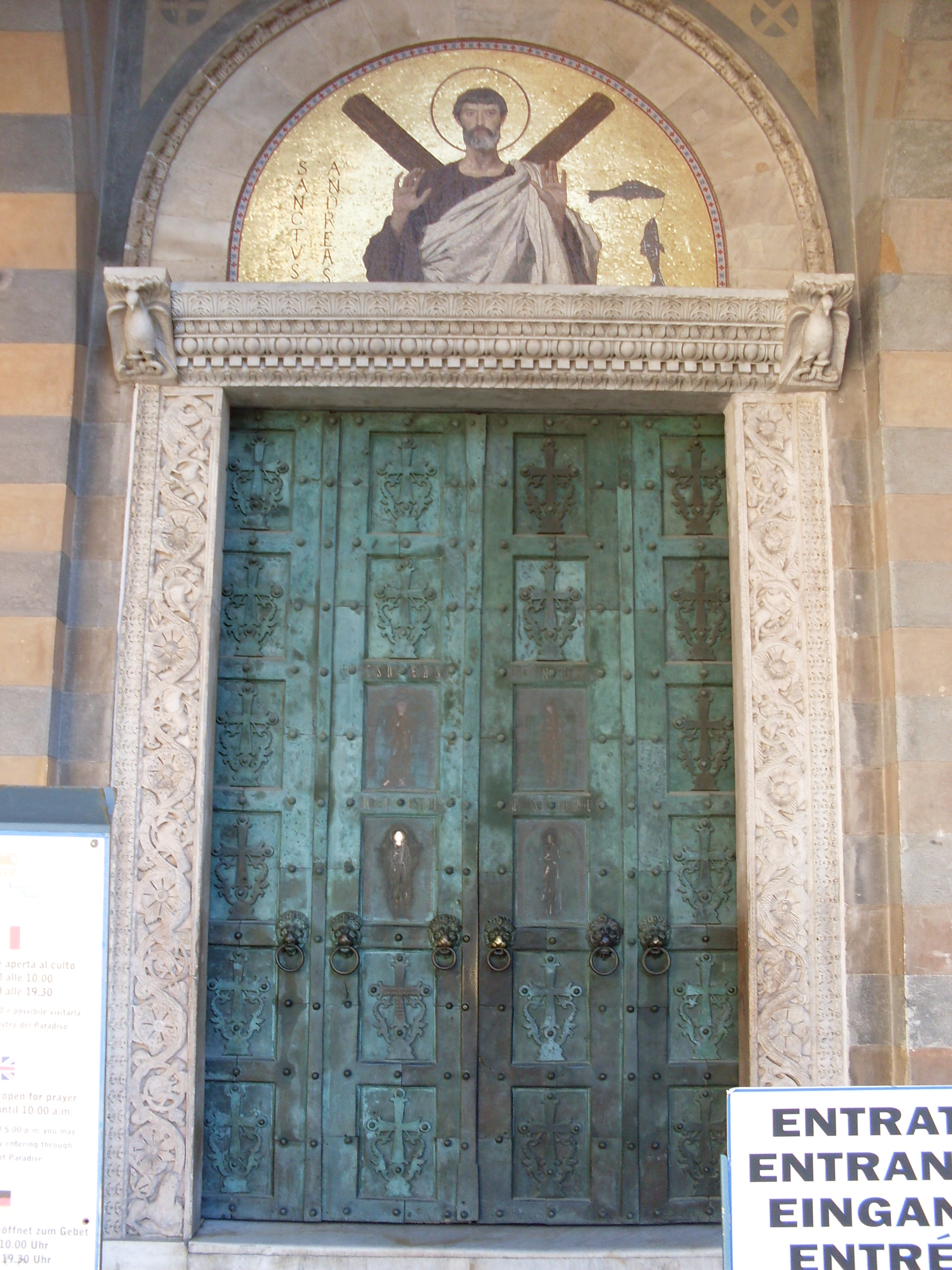
Clockwise from top:
- Amalfi's flag bears the Maltese cross
- Amalfi in a painting by John Ruskin
- Interior of the Amalfi Arsenal, built in the 11th century
- The bronze portal of the Amalfi Cathedral, constructed in the 11th century

Amalfi, the first maritime republic to reach a leading importance, acquired de facto independence from the Duchy of Naples in 839. That year, Sicard of Benevento, during a war against the Byzantines, conquered the city, and deported the population. When he died in a palace conspiracy, the Amalfi people rebelled, drove out the Lombard garrison and formed the free republic of Amalfi. The people of Amalfi were governed by a republican order governed by comites, under which the praefecturii were in charge until 945, when Mastalus II assumed power and proclaimed himself duke.

As early as the end of the 9th century, the duchy developed extensive trade with the Byzantine Empire and Egypt. Amalfitan merchants wrested the Mediterranean trade monopoly from the Arabs and founded mercantile bases in Southern Italy, North Africa and the Middle East in the 10th century. In the 11th century, Amalfi reached the height of its maritime power and had warehouses in Constantinople, Laodicea, Beirut, Jaffa, Tripoli of Syria, Cyprus, Alexandria, Ptolemais, Baghdad, and India.

Amalfi's land borders extended from the Sarno River to Vietri sul Mare, while to the west it bordered the Duchy of Sorrento; it also owned Capri, donated by the Byzantines as a reward for having defeated the Saracens at San Salvatore in 872. Furthermore, for only three years (from 831 to 833), the dukes Manso I and John I also had control of the Principality of Salerno, including the whole of Lucania. The Amalfi fleet helped to free the Tyrrhenian Sea from Saracen pirates, defeating them at Licosa (846), at Ostia (849), and on the Garigliano (915).

At the dawn of AD 1000, Amalfi was the most prosperous city of Longobardia, and in terms of population (probably 80,000 inhabitants) and prosperity, the only one able to compete with the great Arab metropolises: it minted its own gold coin, the tarì, which was current in all the main Mediterranean ports; the Amalfian Laws, a code of maritime law which remained in force throughout the Middle Ages, date back to that time; in Jerusalem, the noble merchant Mauro Pantaleone built the hospital from which the Knights Hospitaller would originate.

The far-sighted dukes of Amalfi were able to safeguard their power over the centuries, allying themselves, depending on the circumstances, with the Byzantines, the Pope, or the Muslims.

On the basis of an erroneous reading of a passage by the humanist Flavio Biondo, the invention of the compass was long attributed to Flavio Gioja from Amalfi. Despite the tenacious tradition that originated, a correct reading of Biondo's passage reveals that Flavio Gioia never existed, and that the glory of the Amalfi people was not that of inventing the compass (actually imported from China), but of having been the first to spread its use in Europe.

The close bond that tied the city of Amalfi to the East is also testified by the art that flourished in the centuries of independence and in which Byzantine and Arab-Norman influences harmoniously merged.

Towards the middle of the 11th century, the power of the duchy began to fade: in 1039, due to internal strife, it was conquered by Guaimar IV of Salerno, who would be expelled in 1052 by his brother John II. In 1073, Robert Guiscard, summoned by the Amalfi people against Salerno, conquered the duchy. Amalfi remained substantially autonomous and often rebelled against the regents until 1100, when the last duke Marinus Sebastus was deposed by the Normans. This left Amalfi only an administrative autonomy, later revoked in 1131 by Roger II of Sicily. After the Norman conquest, the decline was not immediate, becoming in the meantime a seaport of the Norman-Swabian state. However, the commercial basin of Amalfi was reduced to the western Mediterranean and gradually the city was supplanted, locally by Naples and Salerno, and at the Mediterranean level by Pisa, Venice and Genoa.

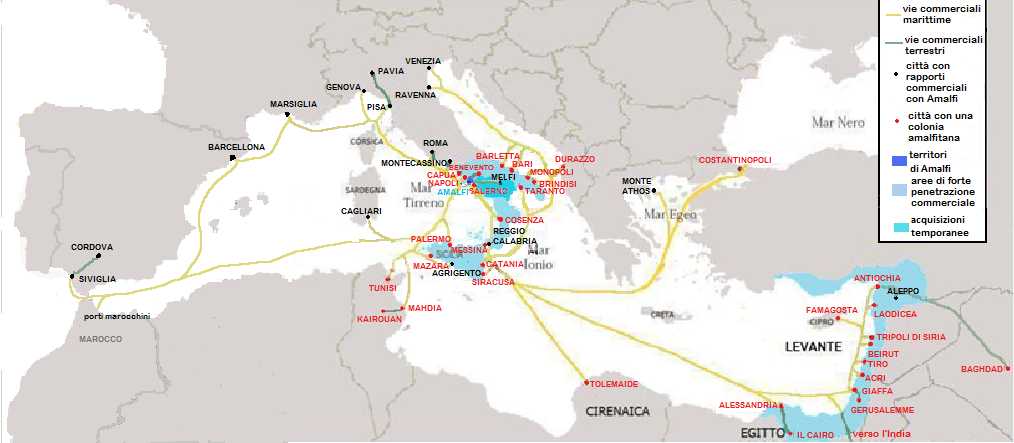
Expansion and trade of Amalfi

=== Genoa ===
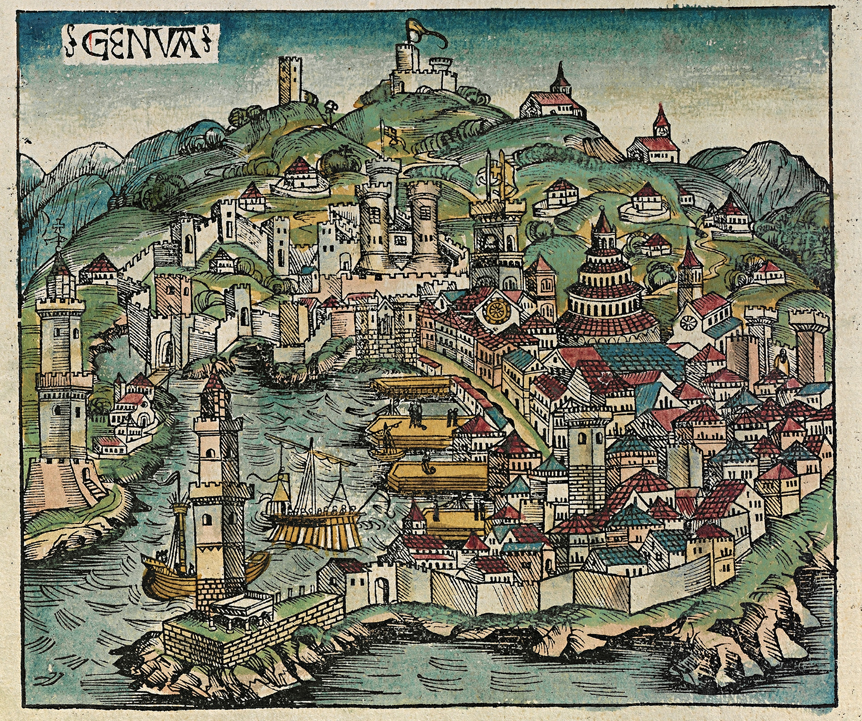
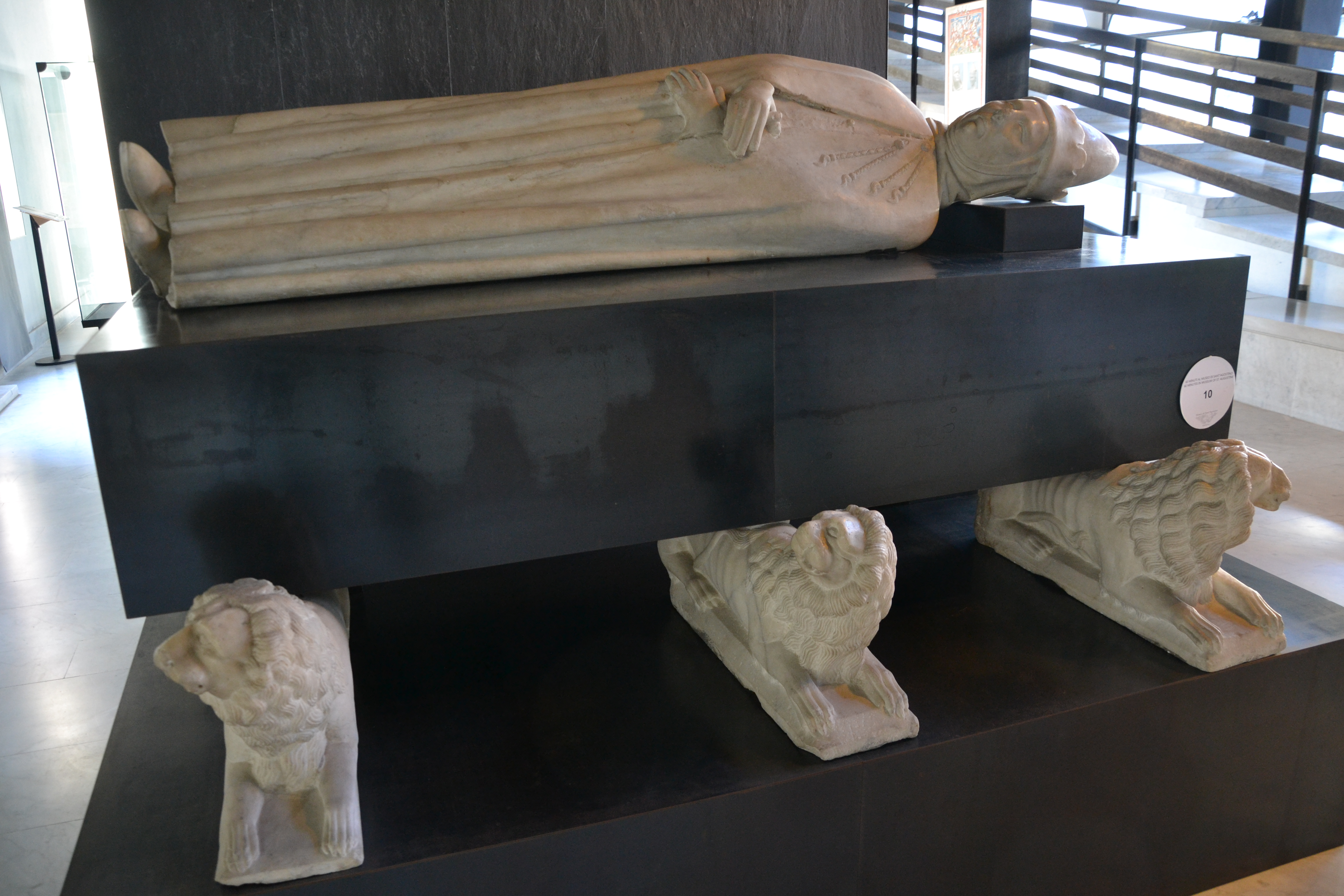
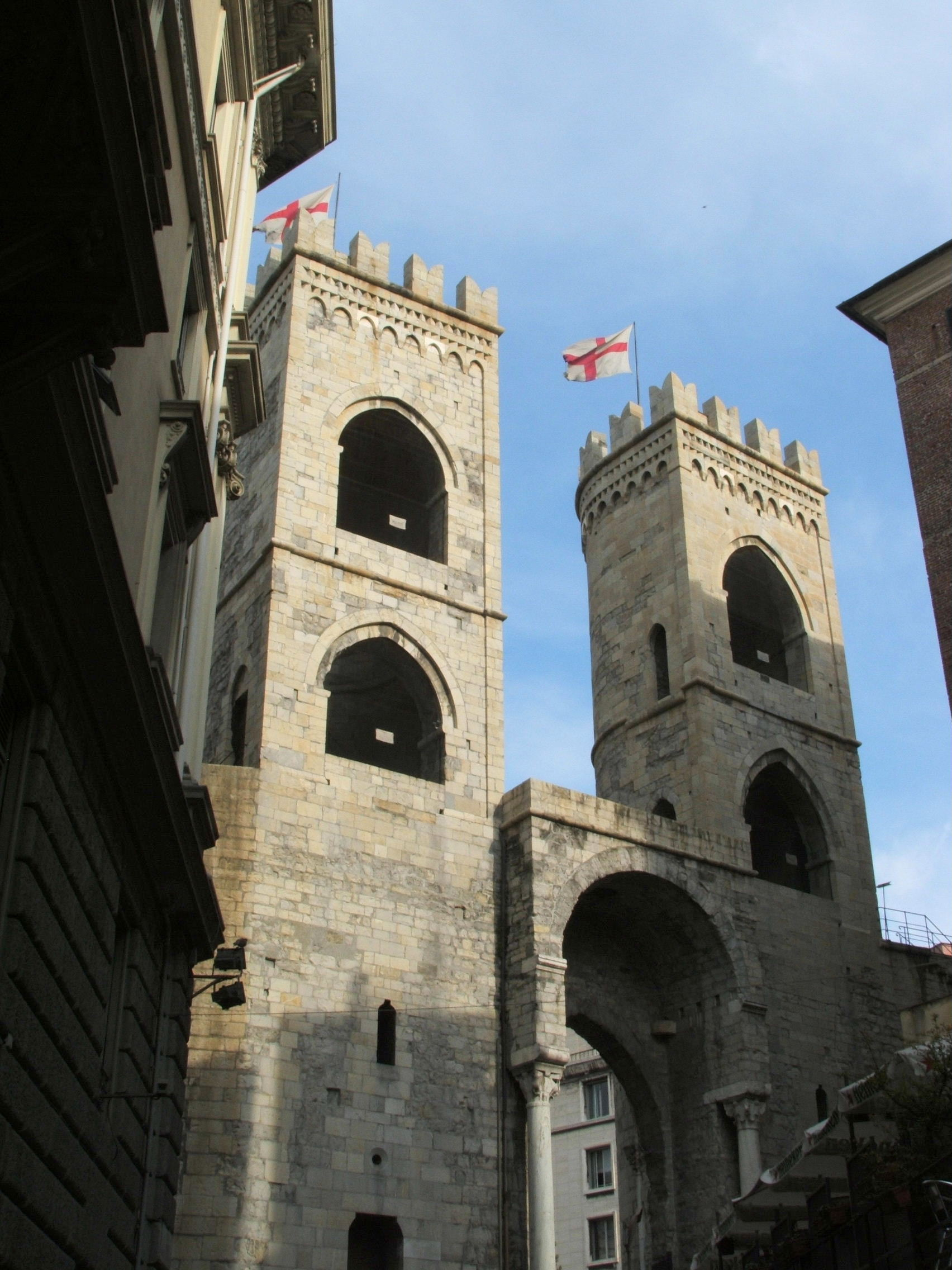
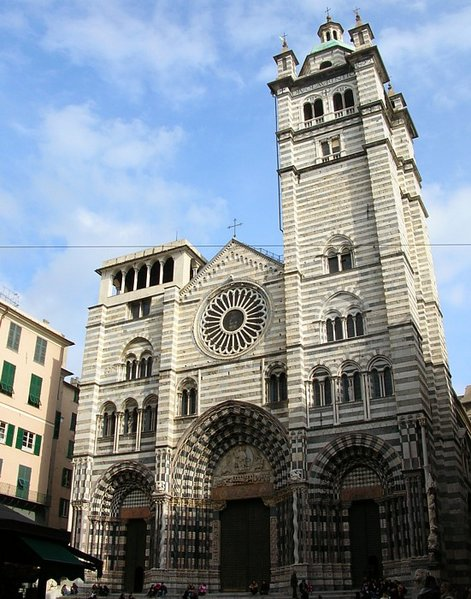
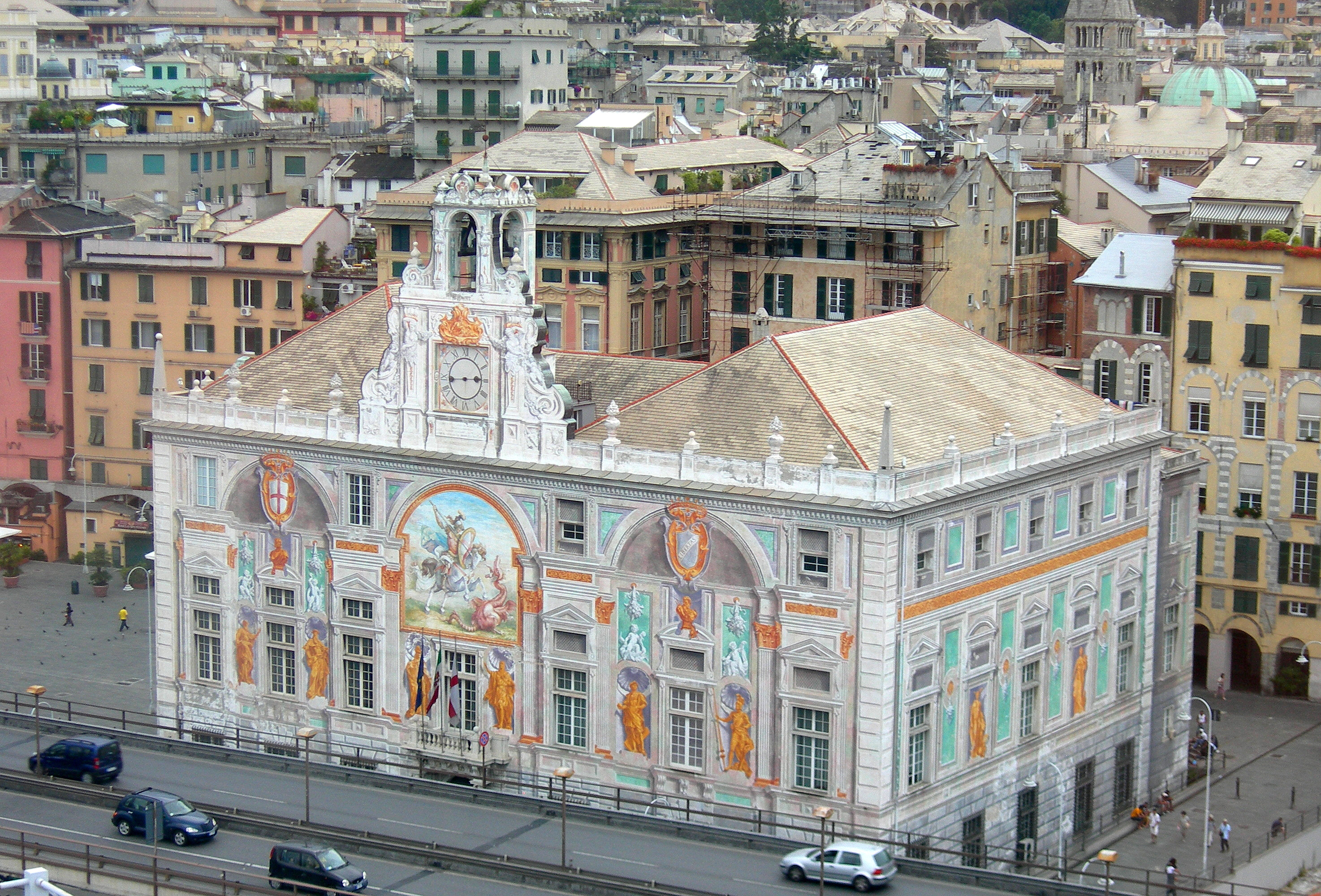
Clockwise from top:
- Genoa's flag bears Saint George's Cross
- Panorama of Genoa and its port in the Nuremberg Chronicle 1493
- The Porta Soprana, a remnant of the 12th century city walls
- Palazzo San Giorgio, once the seat of the homonymous bank
- The Genoa Cathedral, built between the 12th and 14th centuries
- Tomb sculpture of Doge Simone Boccanegra, 14th century

Genoa had revived at the dawn of the 10th century when, following the city's destruction by the Saracens, its inhabitants returned to the sea. In the mid-10th century, entering the dispute between Berengar II and Otto the Great, it obtained de facto independence in 958, which was then made official in 1096 with the creation of the Compagna Communis, a union of merchants and feudal lords of the area.

Meanwhile, its alliance with Pisa allowed the liberation of the western Mediterranean from Saracen pirates. The fortunes of the municipality increased considerably thanks to its participation in the First Crusade, which procured great privileges for the Genoese colonists in the Holy Land.

The apogee of Genoese fortunes came in the 13th century, following the Treaty of Nymphaeum (1261) and the double victory over Pisa (Battle of Meloria (1284)) and Venice (Battle of Curzola (1298)). "The Superb", a name for the city derived from Petrarch's work Itinerarium breve de Ianua ad Ierusalem (1358) in which he described it, dominated the Mediterranean Sea and the Black Sea and controlled a large part of Liguria, Corsica, the Sardinian Judicate of Logudoro, the North Aegean, and southern Crimea.

The 14th century marked a serious economic, political and social crisis for Genoa, which, weakened by internal strife, lost Sardinia to the Aragonese, was defeated by Venice at Alghero (1353) and Chioggia (1379) and subjected several times to France and to the Duchy of Milan. The republic was weakened by the state's own arrangement, which, based on private agreements between the main families, led to incredibly short and unstable governments and very frequent factional strife.

Following the plagues and foreign dominations of the 14th and 15th centuries, the city experienced a second apogee upon regaining self-government in 1528 through the efforts of Andrea Doria, to the point that the following century was called El siglo de los Genoveses. This definition was not due to maritime trade, but to the impressive banking penetration lent by the Bank of Saint George, which made it an authentic world economic power: several European monarchies, such as Spain, were tied to loans from Genoese bankers and its currency, the genovino, became one of the most important in the world.

However, the republic was then only independent de jure, because it found itself under the influence of the main neighboring powers, first the French and the Spanish, then the Austrians and the Savoys. The republic collapsed following Napoleon's first Italian campaign: becoming the Ligurian Republic in 1797, it was annexed to France in 1805 with the second Italian campaign. In 1815, the Congress of Vienna decreed Genoa's annexation to the Kingdom of Sardinia.

The artistic importance of Genoa has been recognized by UNESCO by listing the Strade Nuove and the complex of the Palazzi dei Rolli among the World Heritage Sites. The indissoluble link between Genoa and navigation is testified by Lancelotto Malocello, by Vandino and Ugolino Vivaldi, and most prominently by Christopher Columbus.

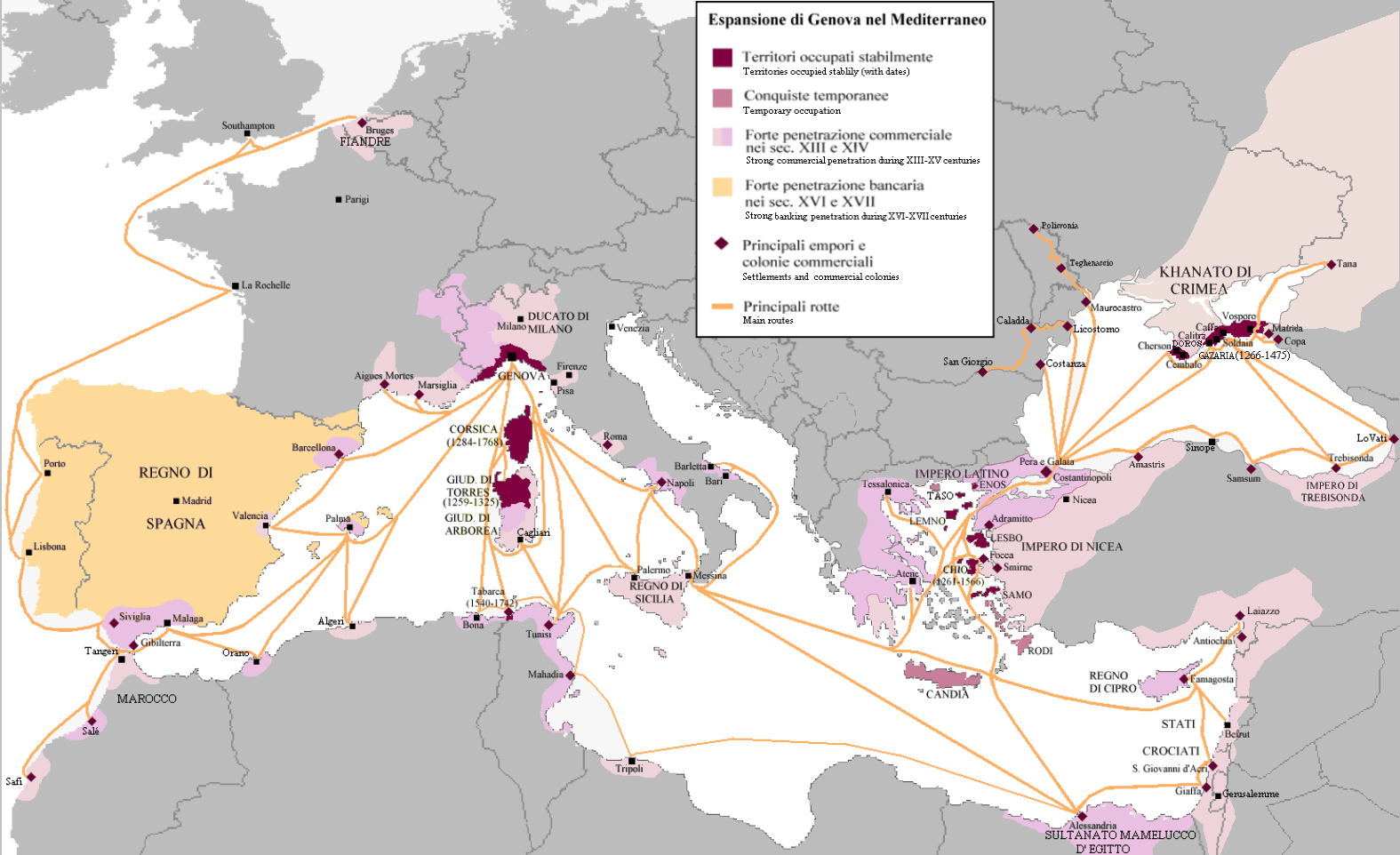
Expansion and trade of Genoa

=== Pisa ===
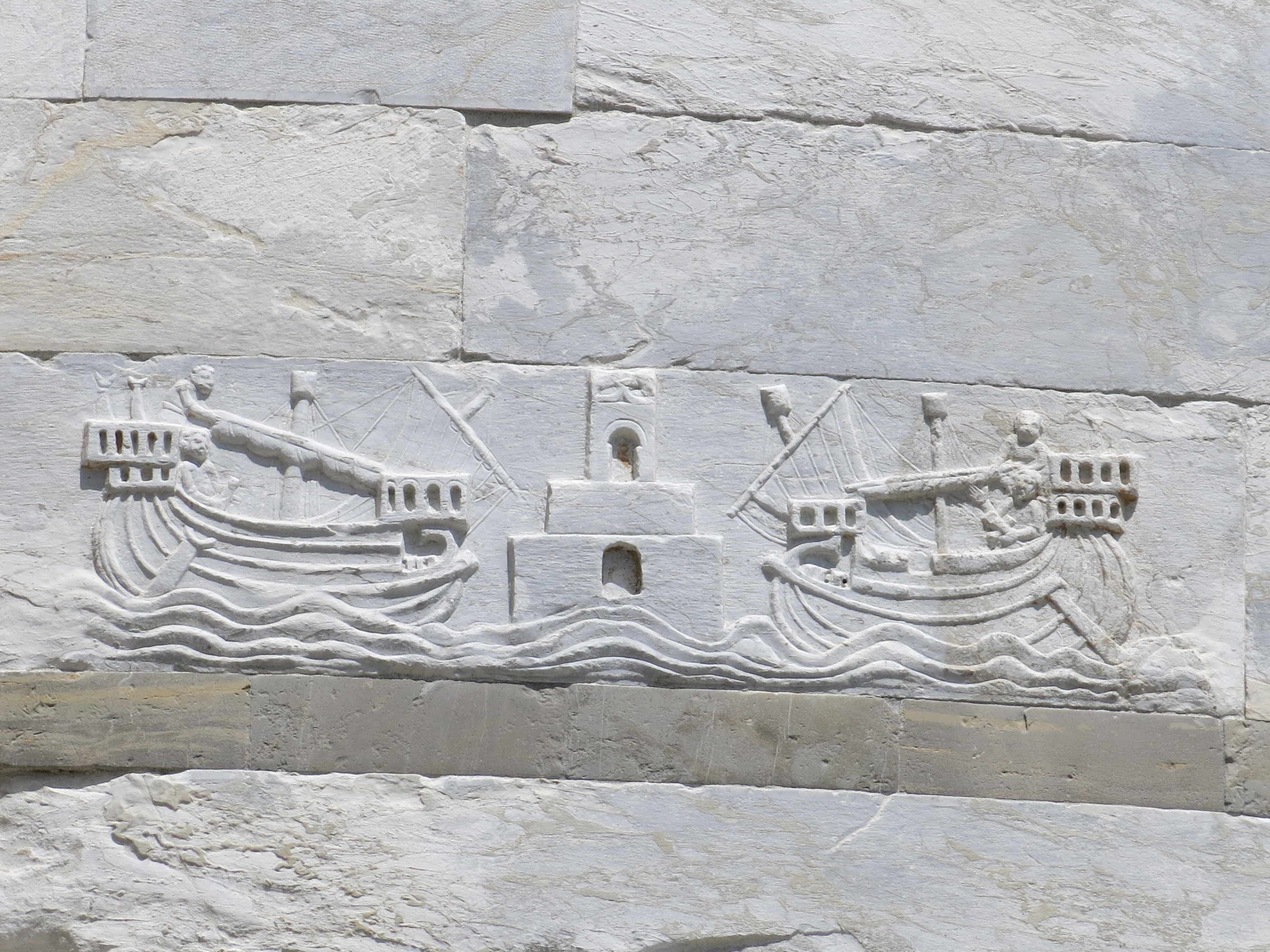
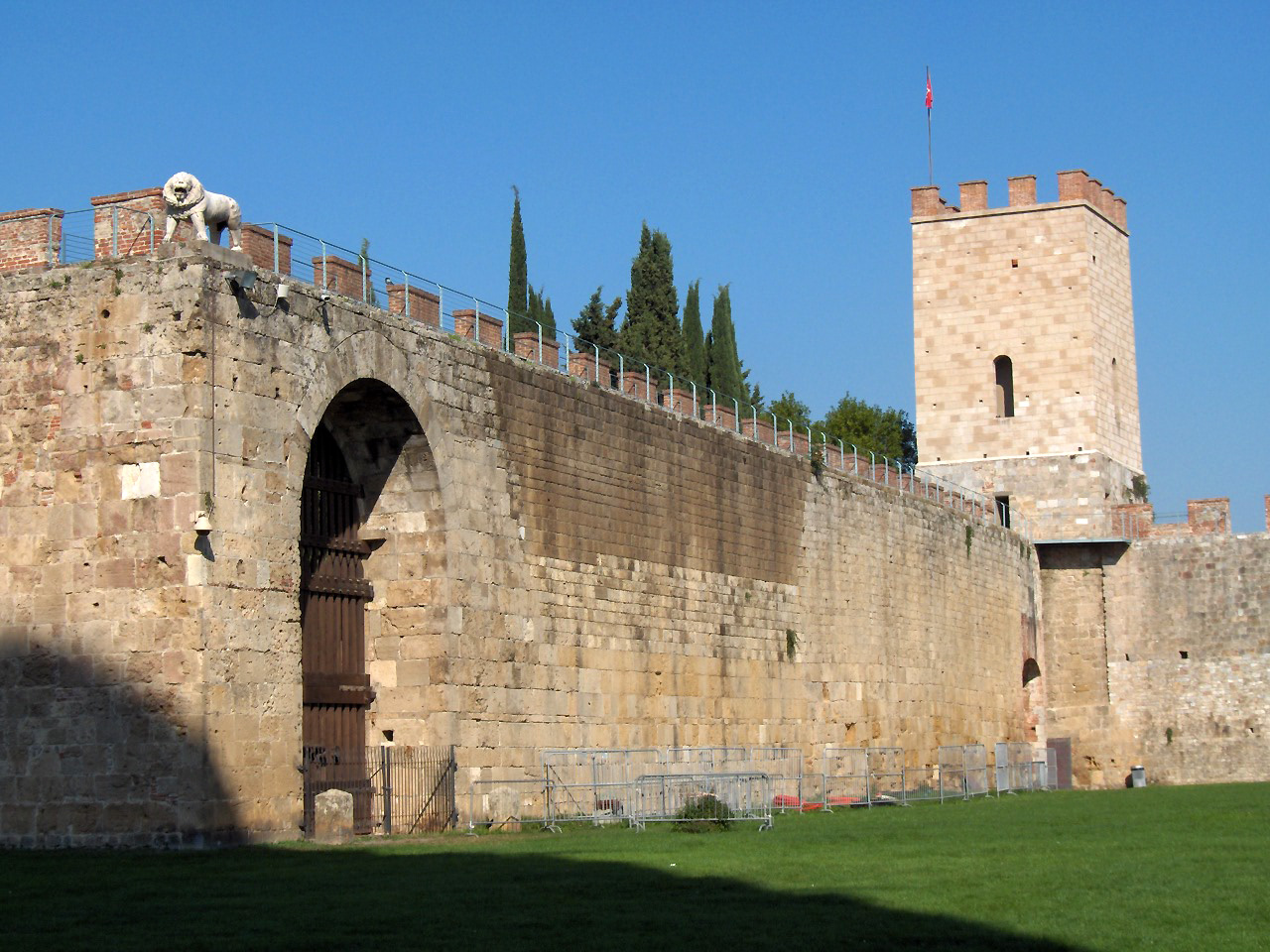
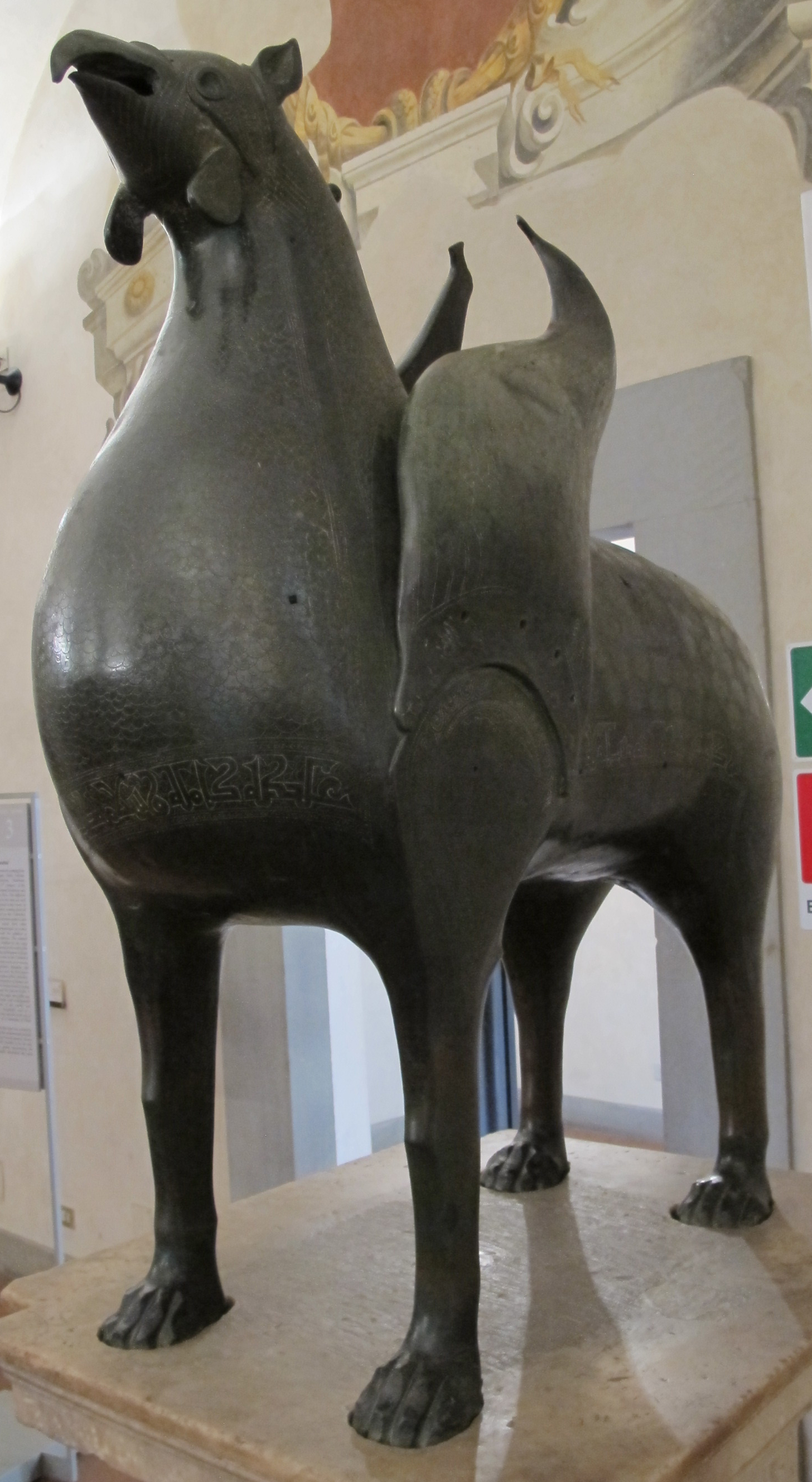
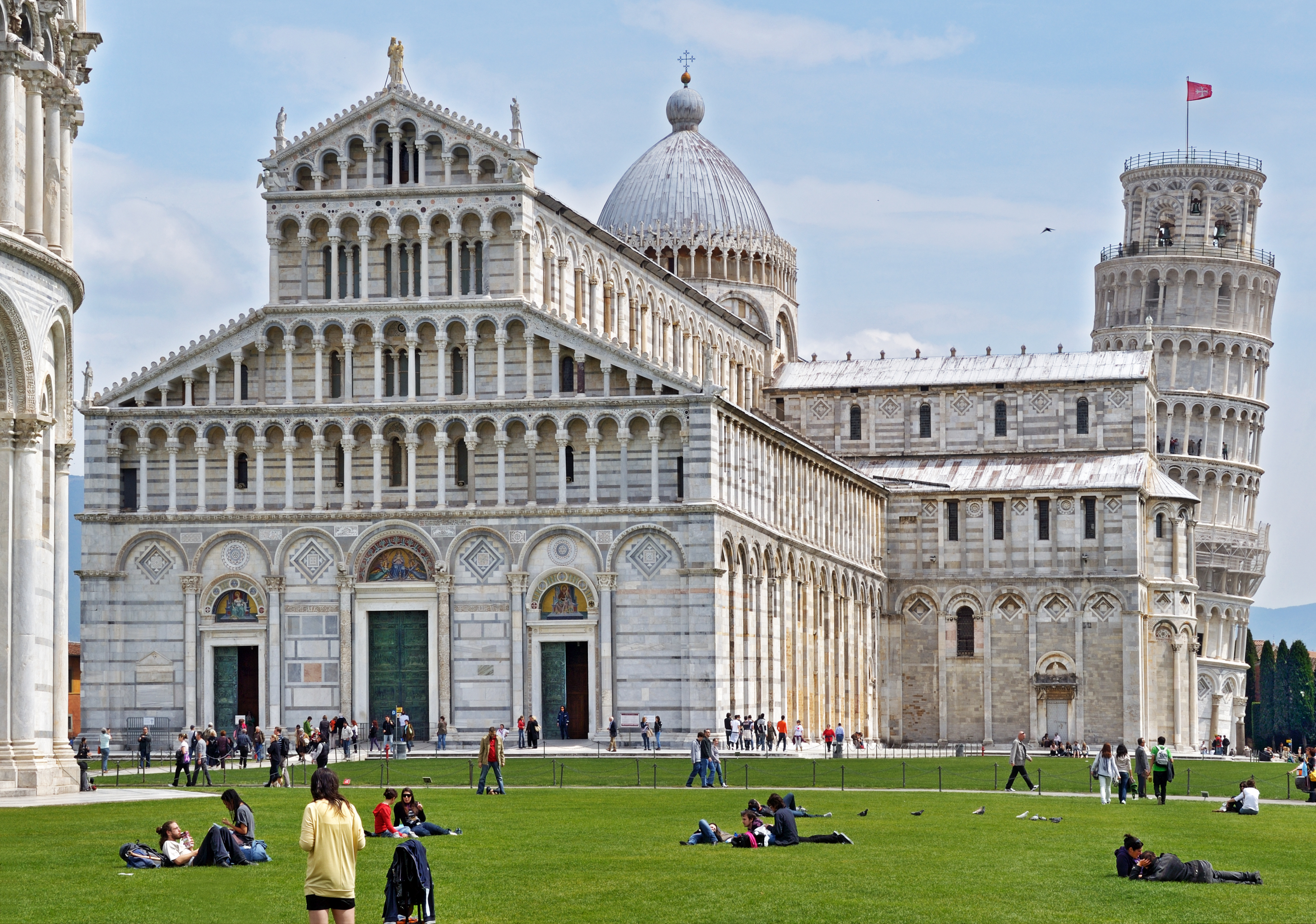
Clockwise from top:
- The Pisan cross
- Pisan ships on a relief on the Tower of Pisa, 12th century
- The City walls constructed in 1156
- The Pisa Cathedral and the Leaning Tower , built in the 12th century
- The Griffin – a spoil from one of Pisa's many campaigns against Islamic strongholds

The Republic of Pisa was born in the 11th century. In this historical period, Pisa intensified its trade in the Mediterranean Sea, allied itself with the Kingdom of Sicily's nascent power, and clashed several times with the Saracen ships, defeating them in Reggio Calabria (1005), in Bona (1034), in Palermo (1064), and in Mahdia (1087).

Originally, Pisa was governed by a Viscount, whose power was limited by the Bishop. In the 11th century, entering into the struggles between these two powers, the city, governed by a Council of Elders, acquired a de facto autonomy, which was then made official by Henry IV in 1081.

In 1016, an alliance of Pisa and Genoa defeated the Saracens, conquered Corsica and the Sardinian judicates of Cagliari and Gallura, and acquired control of the Tyrrhenian Sea; a century later they took the Balearic Islands. At the same time, Pisa's economic and political power increased considerably with the commercial rights acquired with the Crusades, examplary at Jaffa during the Third Crusade, thanks to which it was able to establish numerous warehouses in the Holy Land. Pisa was always the most fervent supporter of the Ghibelline cause, notably at the naval battle of Giglio in 1241, thus opposing the Guelphs Genoa, Noli, Lucca and Florence: its currency, the aquiline, always bore the name of the emperor.

Pisa reached the peak of its splendor between the 12th and 13th centuries, when its ships controlled the western Mediterranean and was able to express Pisan Romanesque in the field of art, a mixture of Western, Eastern, Islamic and classical elements.

Pisa's rivalry with Genoa sharpened in the 13th century and led to the naval Battle of Meloria (1284), which marked the beginning of Pisan decline; Pisa ceded Corsica to Genoa in 1299, and in 1324, the Battle of Lucocisterna saw Sardinia ceded to Aragon. Unlike Genoa, Pisa needed to control a hinterland, which saw the rival cities of Lucca and Florence nearby: this subtracted forces from their navy and brought the republic to ruin.

In the fourteenth century, Pisa passed from a municipality to a lordship, maintaining its independence and essentially the dominion of the Tuscan coast, and made peace with Genoa. However, in 1406, the city was besieged by the Milanese, Florentines, Genoese and French and annexed to the Republic of Florence. During Florence's crisis in the Italian Wars, Pisa revolted against Piero the Unfortunate and in 1494 reconstituted itself as an autonomous republic, restoring its own currency and magistracy. However, after 16 years of serious war, Florence managed to reconquer it definitively in 1509.

The ancient Porto Pisano, now filled in by the Arno floods, was located north of the current city of Livorno. The life of Fibonacci, a mathematician from Pisa, well expresses the profitable relationship between commerce, navigation and culture typical of the maritime republics; he reworked and disseminated Arab scientific knowledge in Europe, including ten-digit numbering, and the use of zero.

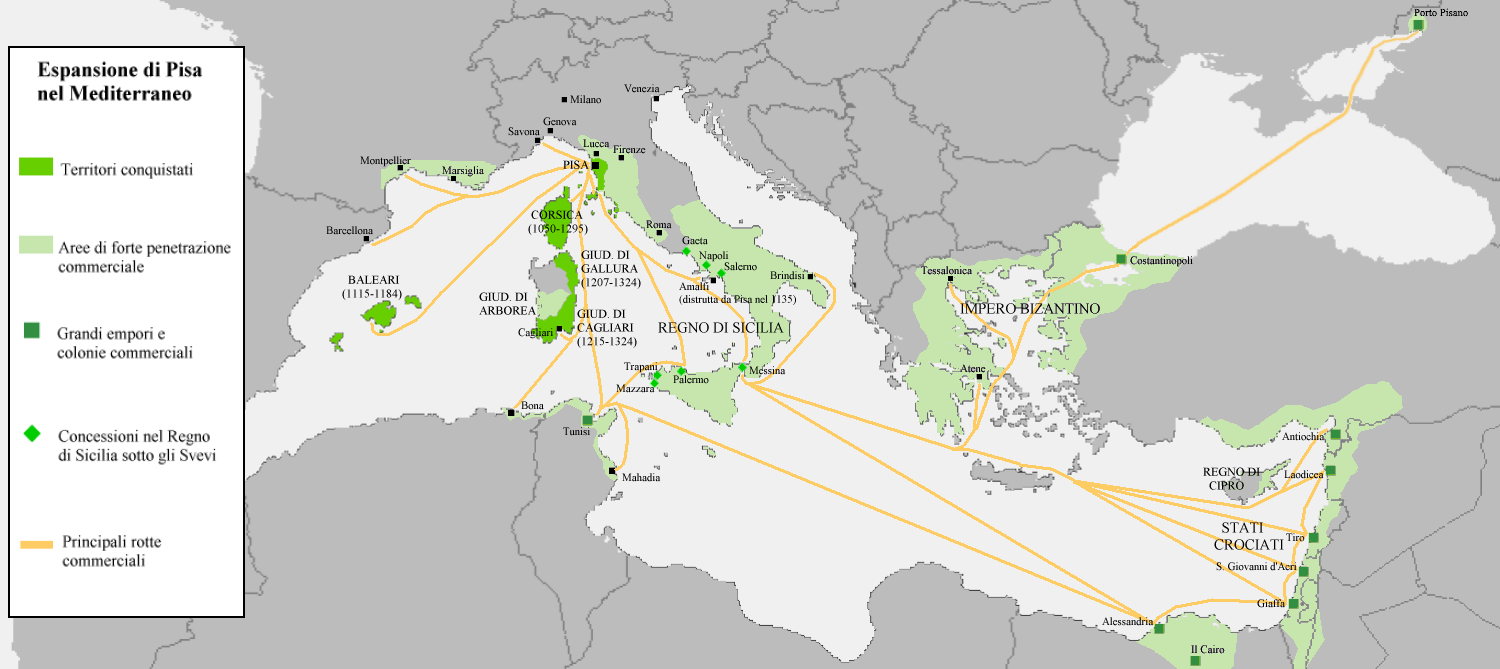
Maximum expansion of Pisa in the Mediterranean Sea

=== Venice ===
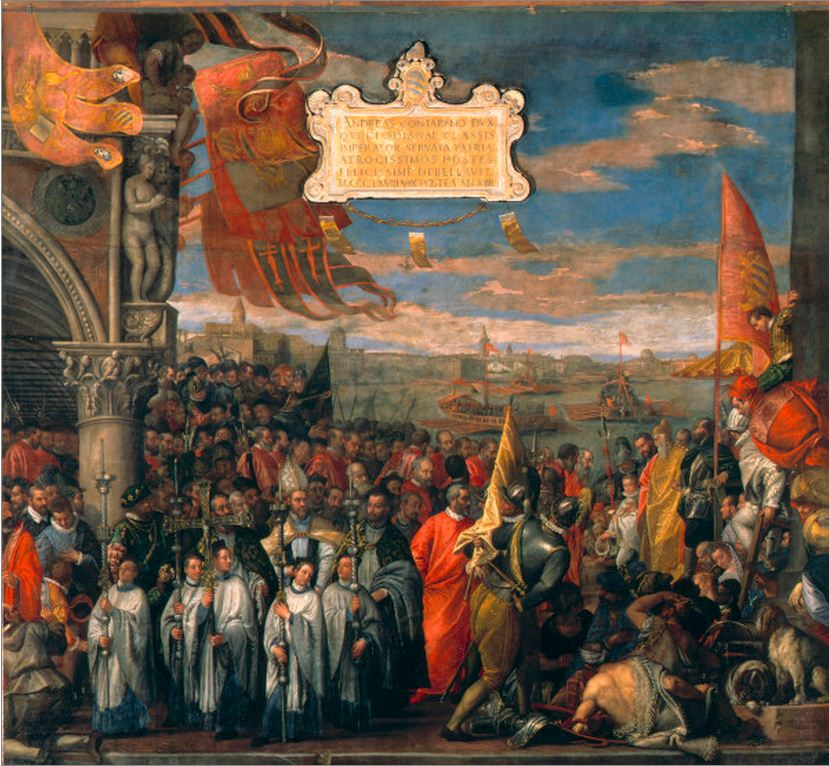
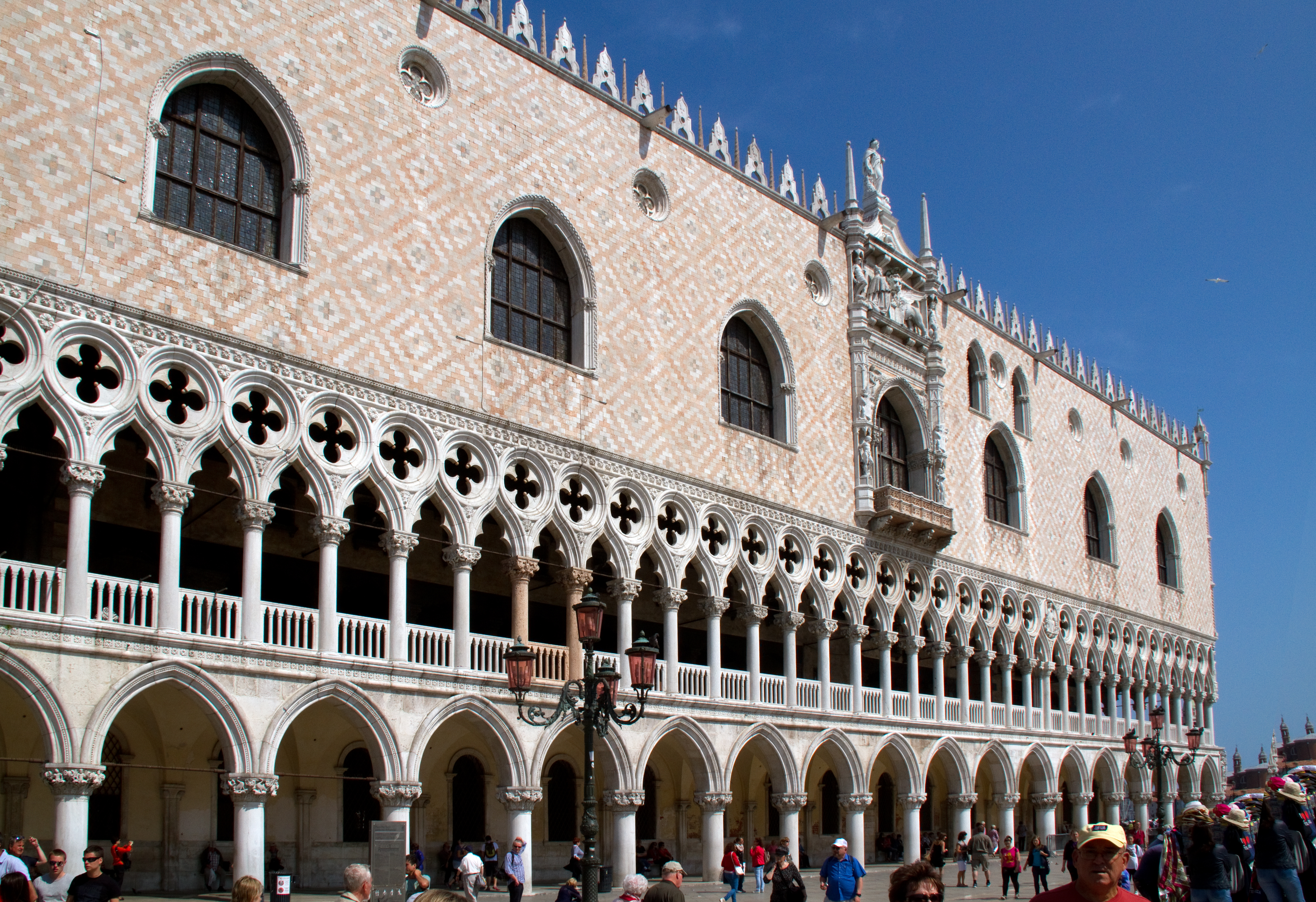
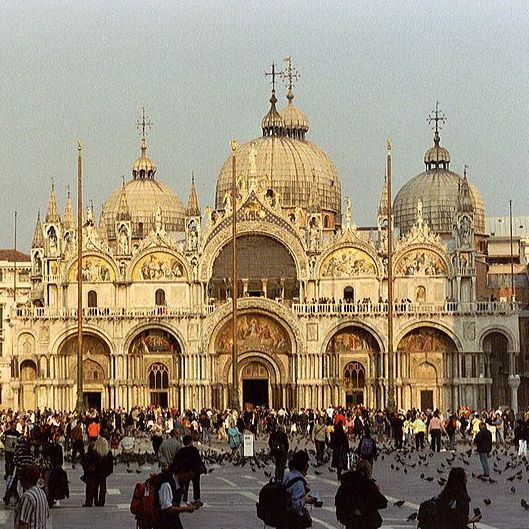
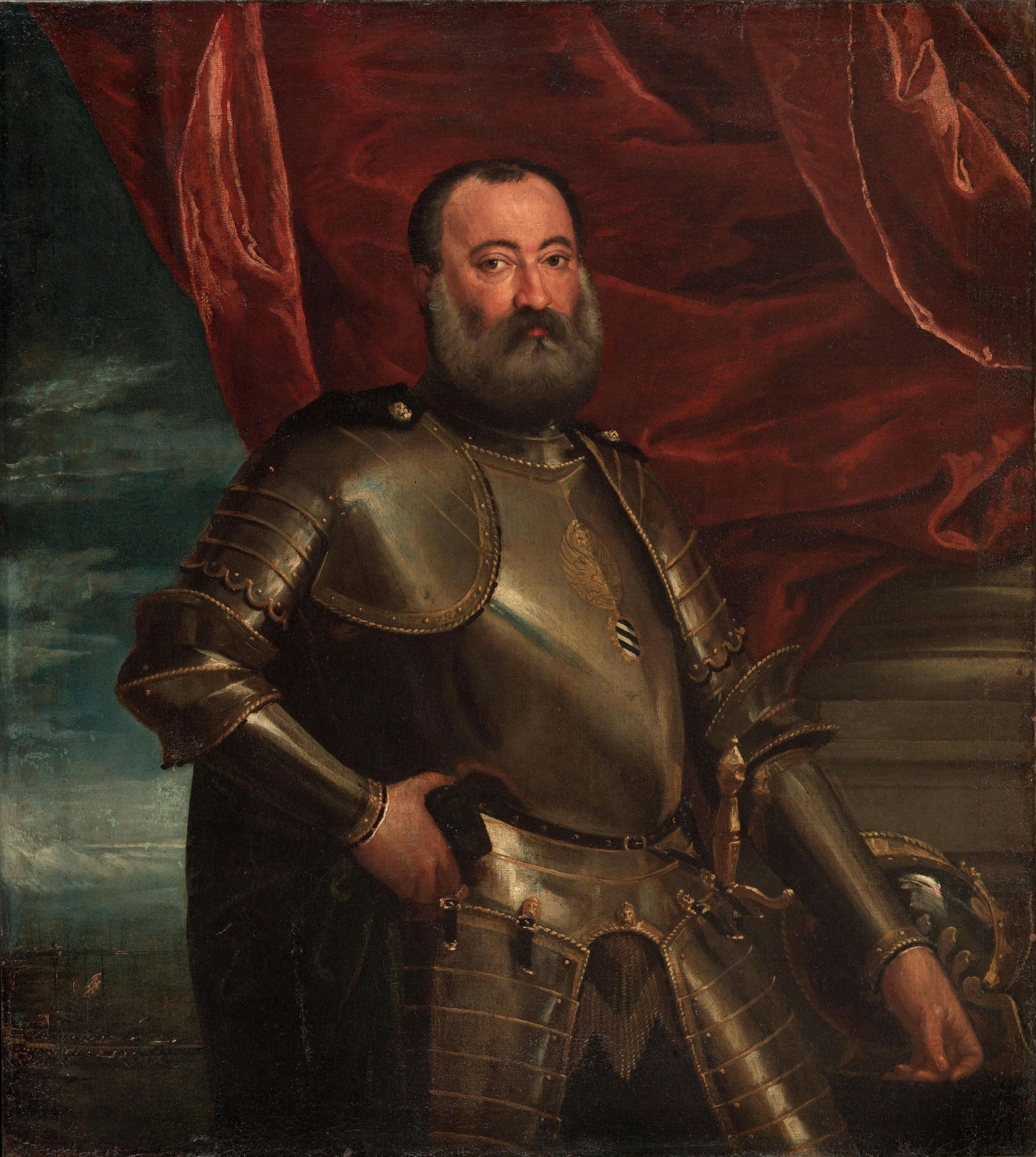
Clockwise from top:
- The Venetian flag bears the Lion of Saint Mark
- The Doge's Palace, built in the 14th century
- A Venetian Admiral at Lepanto, painting Paolo Veronese 1570s
- St Mark's Basilica, built in the 11th century
- The Doge Andrea Contarini Returning Victorious from Chioggia

Venice, founded by the Veneti fleeing the Huns in the 5th century, began a gradual process of independence from the Byzantine Empire starting with the Exarchate of Ravenna's collapse in 751. Progress was made in 840 with the stipulation of the Pactum Lotharii between the doge Pietro Tradonico and the Germanic emperor Lothair I, without the Byzantine sovereign being called into question. Venice acquired power from the development of commercial relations with the Byzantine Empire, of which it was formally still part, to remain even later on as an ally in the fight against the Arabs and Normans. The definitive break with Constantinople came only with the war of 1122-1126, when the doge Domenico Michiel declared war on the Eastern Empire following his refusal to renew the commercial privileges already guaranteed to his Venetian vassal as a reward for the help offered in the war against the Normans in 1082. This war led to complete independence, in law and in fact, institutionalized in 1143 with the Commune of Venice.

Around the year 1000, Venice began its expansion in the Adriatic Sea, defeating the pirates who occupied the coasts of Istria and Dalmatia and placing those regions and their principal townships under Venetian dominion.

Institutionally, Venice was governed by an oligarchy of the main merchant families, under the presidency of the doge and numerous articulated magistracies, including the Senate; notable was the Serrata del Maggior Consiglio (1297), with which those who did not belong to the most important merchant families were excluded from the government. In Venice, the Capitulare nauticum, one of the first navigation codes, was written in 1256.

The Fourth Crusade (1202-1204) allowed Venice to conquer the most commercially important seaside resorts of the Byzantine Empire, including Corfu (1207) and Crete (1209), and to reach Syria and Egypt. Venice thus reached the peak of its power, dominating commercial traffic between Europe and the East: it had warehouses throughout the eastern Mediterranean and was called La Serenissima (The Most Serene). By the end of the 14th century, Venice had become one of the richest states on the continent: its currency, the sequin, was minted in gold and was one of the most influential in Europe.

Between the 14th and 18th centuries, Venice, in response to the Duchy of Milan's aggressive policy, conquered a vast dominion of the mainland, including Veneto, Friuli, the Julian March, and Lombardy up to Brescia; this was joined by the Stato da Màr, a colonial empire made up of overseas possessions, including Istria, Dalmatia (except Ragusa), almost all the Greek islands and Cyprus. Venice was therefore the largest of the maritime republics, as well as the most powerful state on the Italian peninsula.

Venice's dominance in the eastern Mediterranean in the following centuries, despite the victory of Lepanto, was threatened and compromised by the expansion of the Ottoman Empire and by the shifting of trade to the Atlantic. Thus began a slow decline, culminating with the Napoleonic conquest of 1797, which reduced it to a city-state dependent on the Habsburgs, until the union with the Kingdom of Lombardy–Venetia in 1848.

Artistically, Venice had European resonance for centuries: in the Middle Ages by fusing Romanesque, Gothic and Byzantine styles in its architecture; in the Renaissance with the painters Titian, Giorgione, Tintoretto, Bellini and Lotto; in the Baroque period with the composers Antonio Vivaldi, Giuseppe Tartini and Tomaso Albinoni; in the eighteenth century with vedutisti Giambattista Tiepolo and Canaletto, playwright Carlo Goldoni, sculptor Antonio Canova, and writer and adventurer Giacomo Casanova.

Among the most important Venetian navigators and travelers are Alvise Cadamosto, cartographer Sebastian Cabot, and Marco Polo, famous for his account of his trip to China, The Travels of Marco Polo. John Cabot, whose place of birth is uncertain (Gaeta, Castiglione Chiavarese or Savona), but who acquired Venetian citizenship, was the first European to reach Canada.

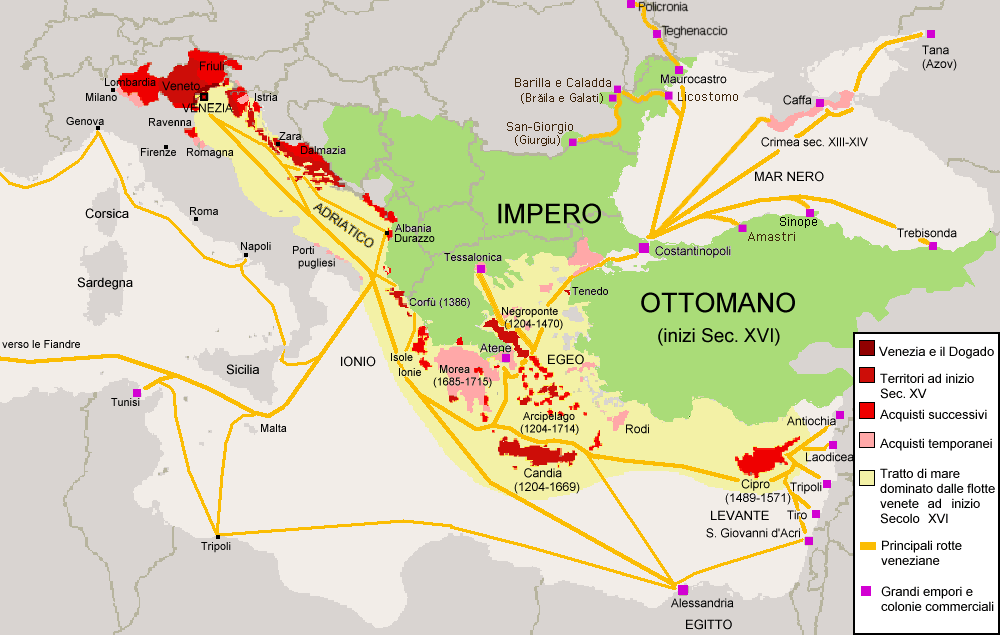
Expansion and trade of Venice

=== Ancona ===
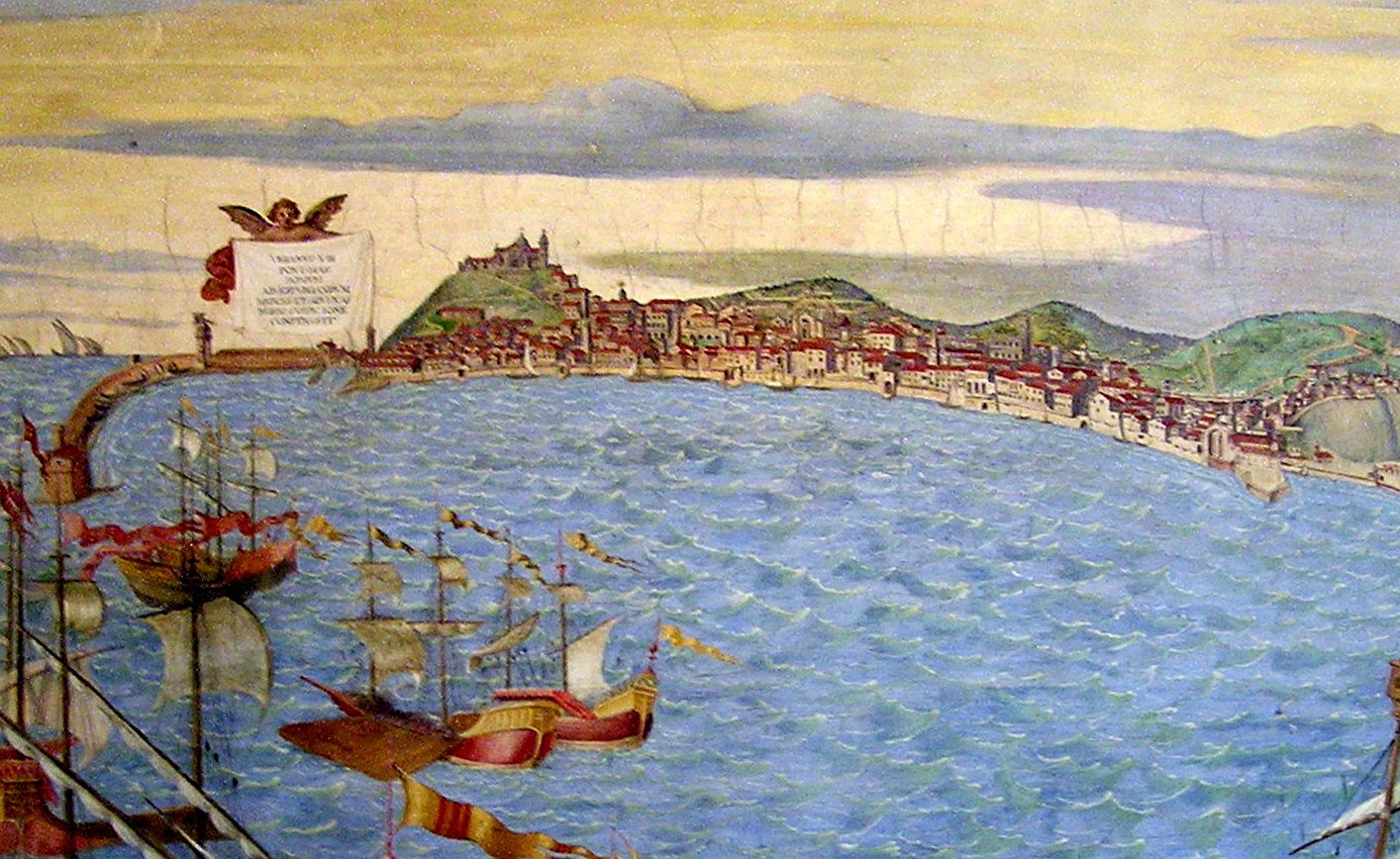
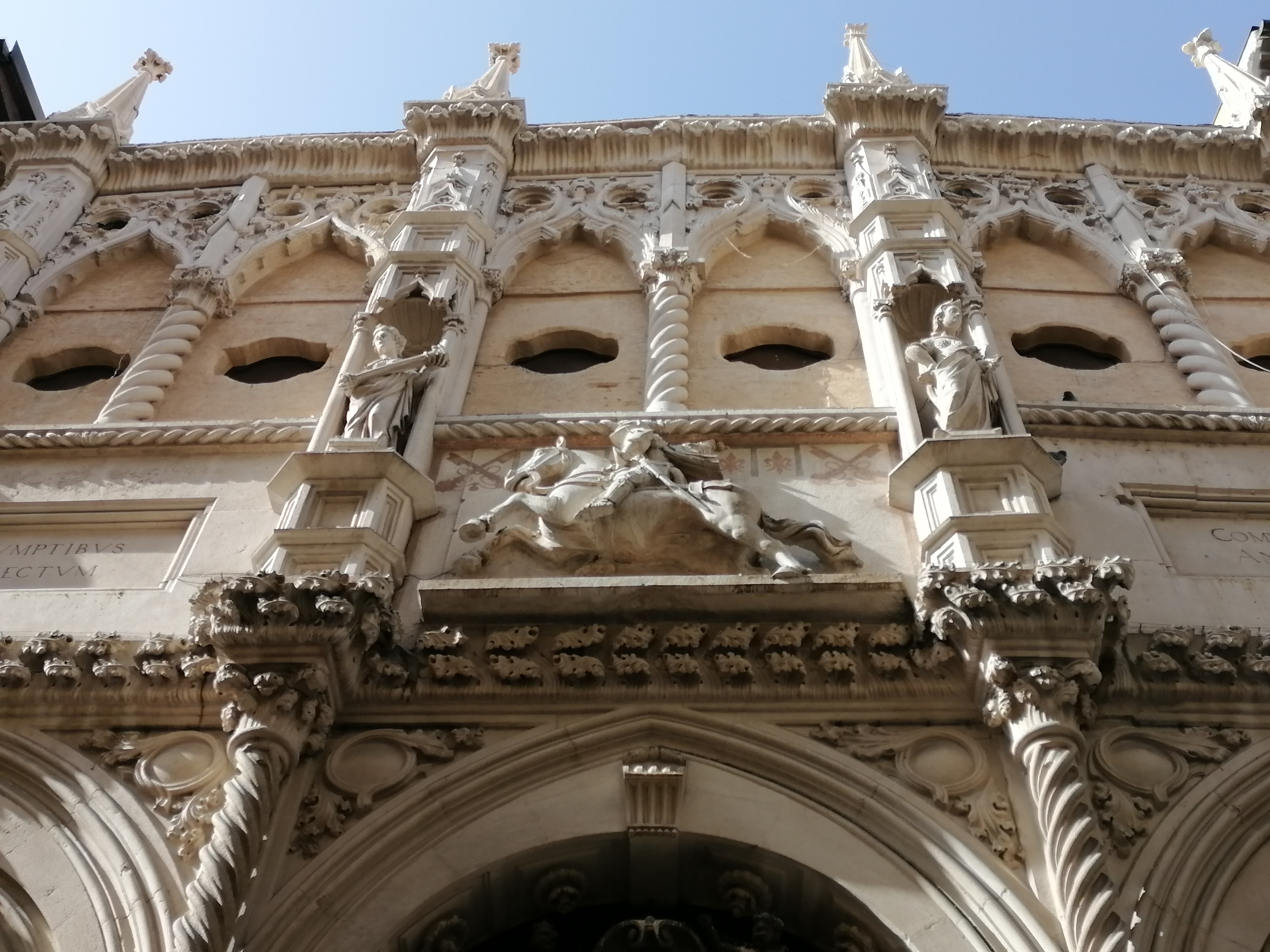
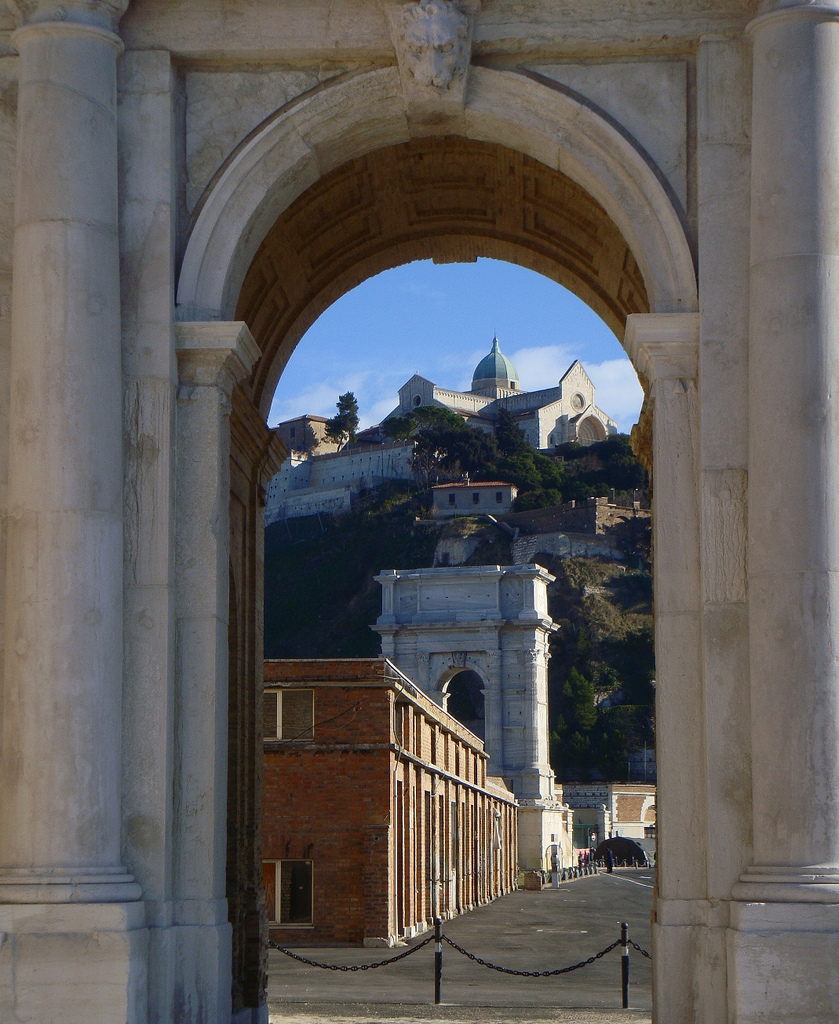
Clockwise from top:
- The Anconan Cross
- Panorama of Ancona from the sea, painted in the 16th century
- The Loggia dei Mercanti (built in the 15th century), seat of merchant meetings and negotiations
- The Ancona Cathedral (expanded in the 13th century) and the Arch of Trajan (built in the 2nd century)

Included in the Papal States since 774, Ancona was devastated by the Saracens in 839; slowly recovering, around 1000 it became part of the Holy Roman Empire, but gradually acquired autonomy until it became fully independent in the 11th century. Although hampered by Venice, which intended to monopolize the Adriatic, Ancona maintained its independence and economic prosperity thanks to its alliances with the Byzantine Empire, the Kingdom of Hungary, and especially with the Republic of Ragusa.

The Republic of Ancona is distinct in that it never attacked another maritime city, continuously needed to defend itself, was totally devoted to navigation, and was completely uninterested in territorial expansion. Above all, it had to beware of the aims of the Holy Roman Empire (from which it suffered three sieges), of Venice (in the course of five wars), and of the Papacy.

Ancona had its period of greatest splendor in the 15th century, when Pope Eugene IV officially defined it as a republic in 1447. The currency of Ancona, accepted in all Mediterranean commercial squares, was the agontano. The maritime laws of Ancona were the Statutes of the Sea, gradually formed during the 12th century and keeping in mind the main medieval maritime codes. Its territory was between the Adriatic, the rivers Esino, Musone and Aspio, and defended by the twenty castles of Ancona.

In the defense of its freedom, Ancona emerged victorious several times, such as in the siege of 1173, in which Germanic imperial troops surrounded the city from the sea while Venetian ships occupied the port. There was an eclipse of freedom in the period from 1348 to 1383; the city was conquered by the House of Malatesta in 1348, when it was weakened by the plague and by serious fires. It then passed under the control of the Church in 1353 through the work of the warrior cardinal Gil de Albornoz. In 1383, the papal rocca that kept Ancona submissive was destroyed by a popular furor, and the ancient regime of autonomy was re-established.

Ancona's decline began with the fall of Constantinople, which weakened trade. In 1532, Pope Clement VII placed Ancona under the direct administration of the Church with an astute manoeuvre, and attempts to regain a de facto freedom were bloodily repressed. However, economic prosperity lasted until the end of the century.

Ancona preserves monuments in which Romanesque blends with Byzantine influences and was one of the cradles of the Adriatic Renaissance, in which the rediscovery of classical art was accompanied by formal continuity with Gothic art.

Ancona's contribution to maritime exploration and trade is well represented by Cyriacus of Ancona, who sailed in search of evidence of the past and is therefore considered the father of archeology, by Benvenuto Stracca, founder of commercial law, and finally by navigator and maritime cartographer Grazioso Benincasa, key figure of the nautical cartographic school of Ancona, one of the most important of the fifteenth century.

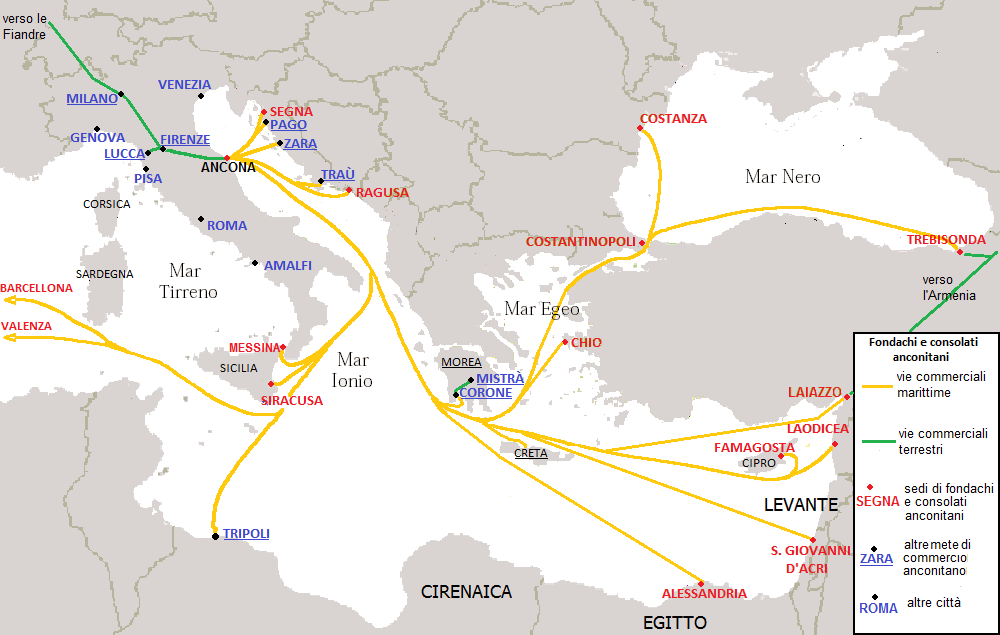
Expansion and trade of Ancona

=== Ragusa ===
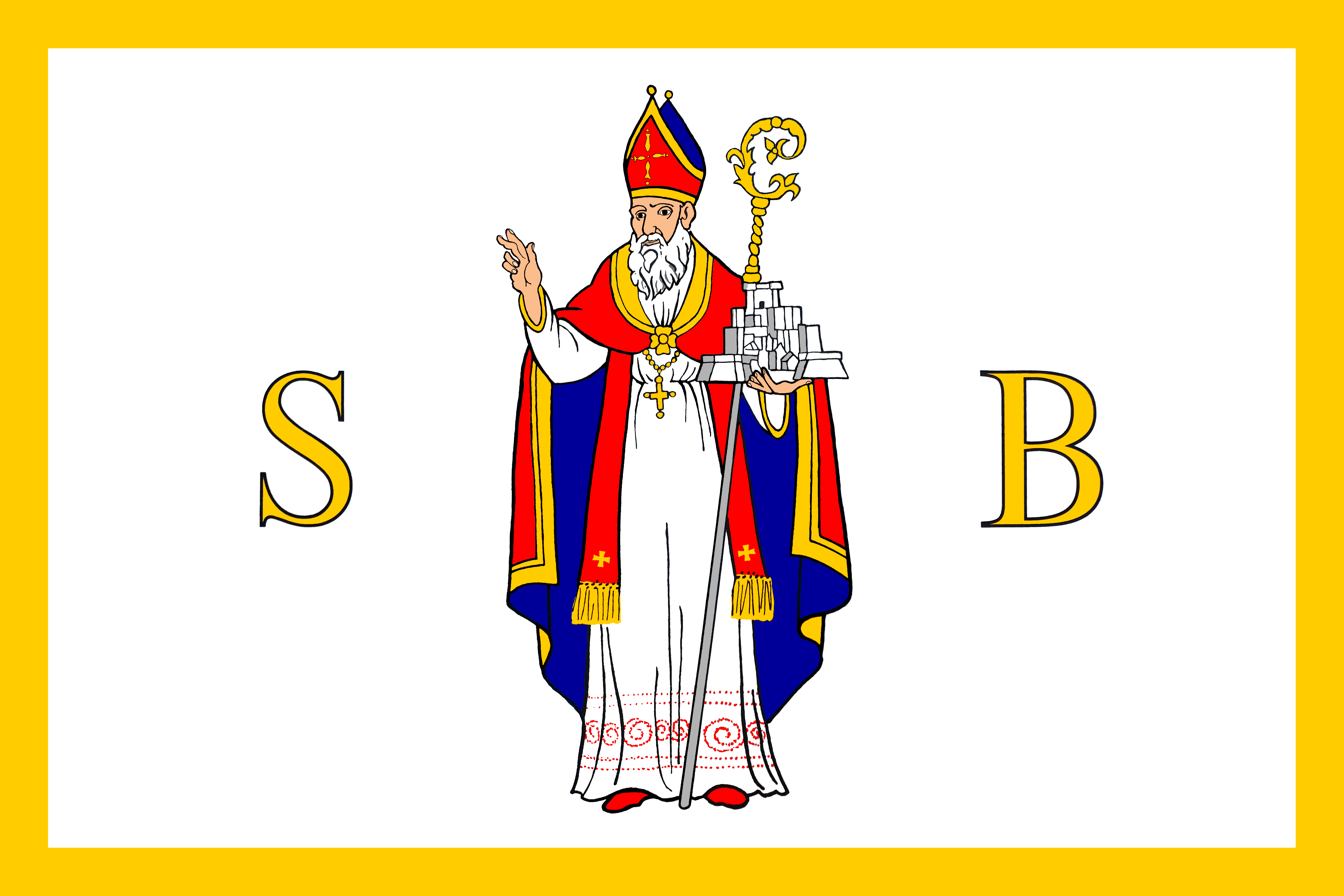
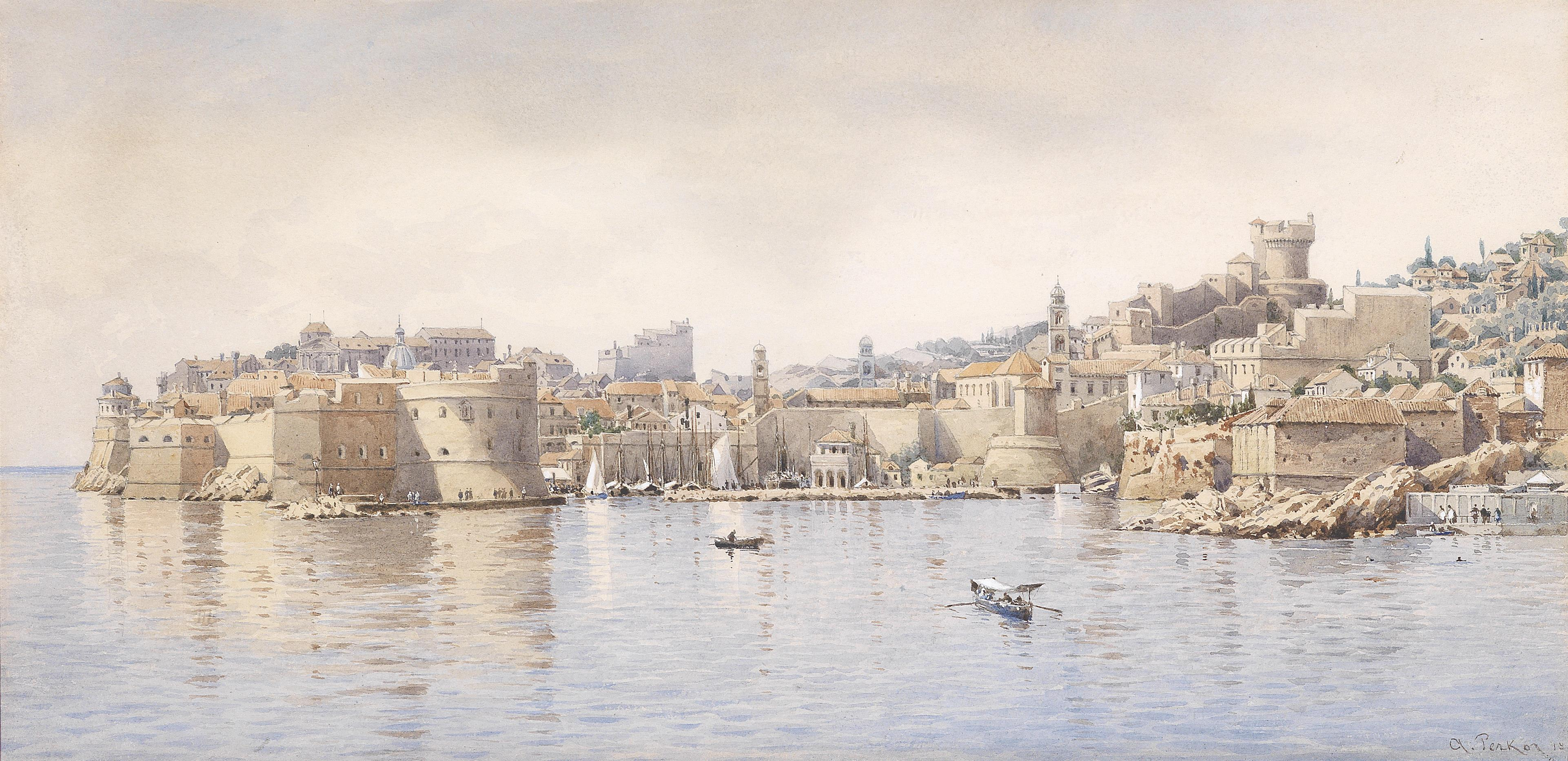
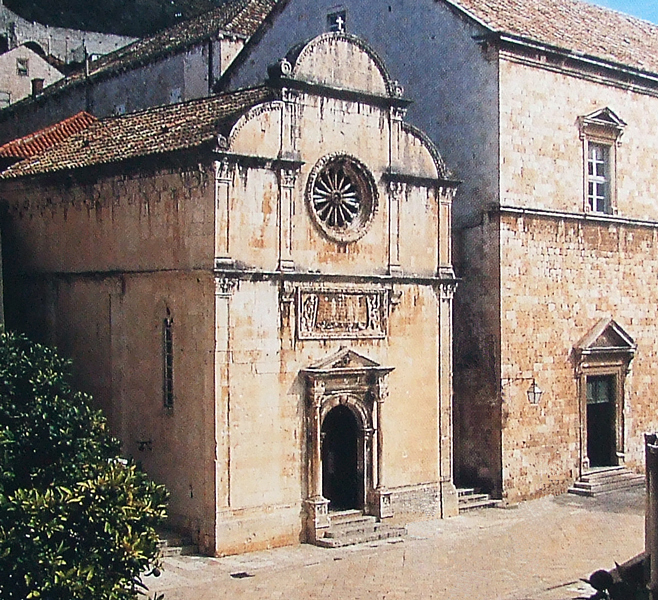
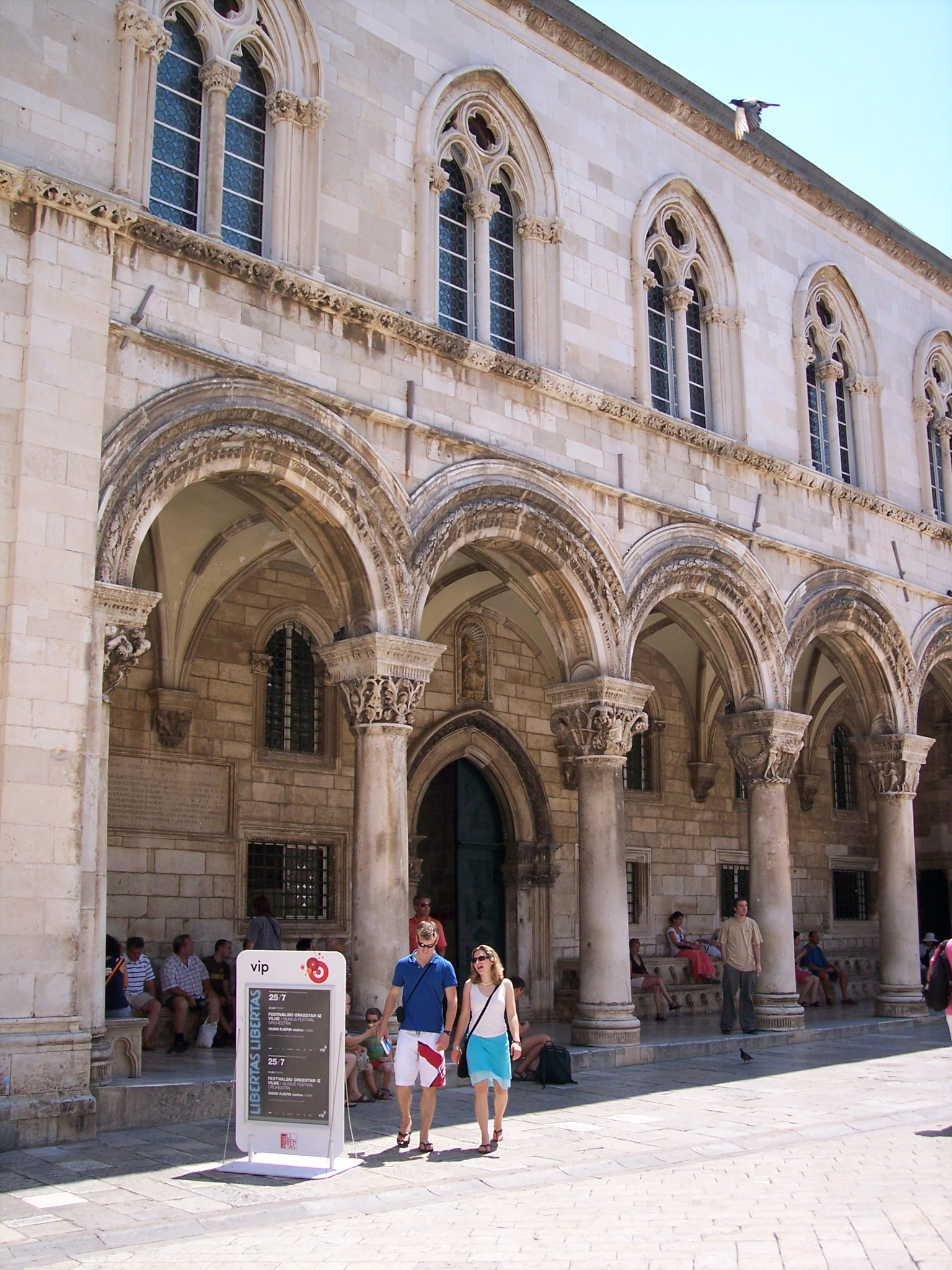
Clockwise from top:
- The Ragusan flag bears the image and initials of Saint Blaise
- Prospectus of Ragusa
- Church of San Salvatore, built in the 16th century
- The Rector's Palace

According to the De Administrando Imperio of the Byzantine emperor Constantine VII Porphyrogennetos, Ragusa (now called Dubrovnik) was founded, probably in the 7th century, by the inhabitants of the Roman city of Epidaurum (modern Cavtat) after its destruction by the Avars and Slavs c. 615. Some of the survivors moved 25 kilometres (16 miles) north to a small island near the coast where they founded a new settlement, Lausa. It has been claimed that a second raid by the Slavs in 656 resulted in the total destruction of Epidaurum. Slavs settled along the coast in the 7th century. The city remained under Byzantine domination until 1204, with the exception of periods of Venetian (1000–1030) and later Norman (1081–1085, 1172, 1189–1190) rule.

In the 7th century, Ragusa began to develop active trade in the eastern Mediterranean. Starting from the 11th century, it established itself as a mercantile city, especially in the Adriatic, and began its alliance with Ancona, necessary to resist the Venetian tendency to consider the Adriatic as its exclusive domain. The republic's territory consisted of a very thin coastal strip between Neum and Oštra, also including the islands of Mljet, Lastovo, the Elaphiti archipelago, and the Pelješac peninsula. Ragusa was one of the few Dalmatian city-states that rivalled Venice in the eastern Adriatic.

In 1358, the Treaty of Zadar forced Venice to yield all claims to Dalmatia. The city accepted the mild hegemony of King Louis I of Hungary. On 27 May 1358, the final agreement was reached at Visegrád between Louis and the Archbishop Ivan Saraka. The city recognized Hungarian sovereignty, but the local nobility continued to rule with little interference from the Hungarian court at Buda. The Republic profited from the suzerainty of Louis of Hungary, whose kingdom was not a naval power, and with whom they would have little conflict of interest. The last Venetian conte left, apparently in a hurry. Although under the Visegrád agreement Dubrovnik was formally under the jurisdiction of the ban of Croatia, the city successfully resisted both the royal and ban authority.

Ragusa, basing its prosperity on maritime trade, became the major power in the southern Adriatic. It reached its apogee in the 16th century, thanks to convenient tax exemptions for goods and an extensive network of warehouses. The mint of Ragusa, active from 1088 to 1803, issued coins with various denominations, which followed the ups and downs of the republic's formal dominion.

In the face of Hungary's defeat in the Battle of Mohács to the Ottoman Empire in 1526, Ragusa passed under the formal supremacy of the sultan, obliging itself to pay him a symbolic annual tribute, a move which allowed it to safeguard its independence.

With the 17th century, a slow decline began for the Republic of Ragusa, mainly due to a 1667 earthquake which almost completely destroyed it, and to the increase in the tribute to be paid to the Sublime Porta, set at 12,500 ducats. Ragusa survived its Venetian rival, which was conquered by Napoleon in 1797. The Peace of Pressburg of 1805 assigned the city to France: the city was occupied by French troops in 1806, and entered the Illyrian Provinces of the French Empire.

Originally, Latin was used in official documents of the Republic. Italian came into use in the 1420s. Both languages were used in official correspondence by the Republic. The Republic was influenced by the Venetian language and the Tuscan dialect. The population spoke the local variant of the Shtokavian dialect, the same dialect upon which modern Croatian, Bosnian, Montenegrin and Serbian, are all based. Old Ragusan, a variant of Dalmatian that was spoken on the Dalmatian coast following the end of the Roman Empire, with elements of old Slavic vernacular, commonly referred to as ilirski (Illyrian), and Italian, were among the common languages. Since it was mainly used in speech, it is poorly documented. Its use started declining in the 15th century.

The wealth of artistic testimonies of the Republic of Ragusa is recognized by UNESCO, which has declared its historical center a World Heritage Site. Ragusa is the only former maritime republic city not to be part of the Italian state: its modern-day territory is in Croatia.

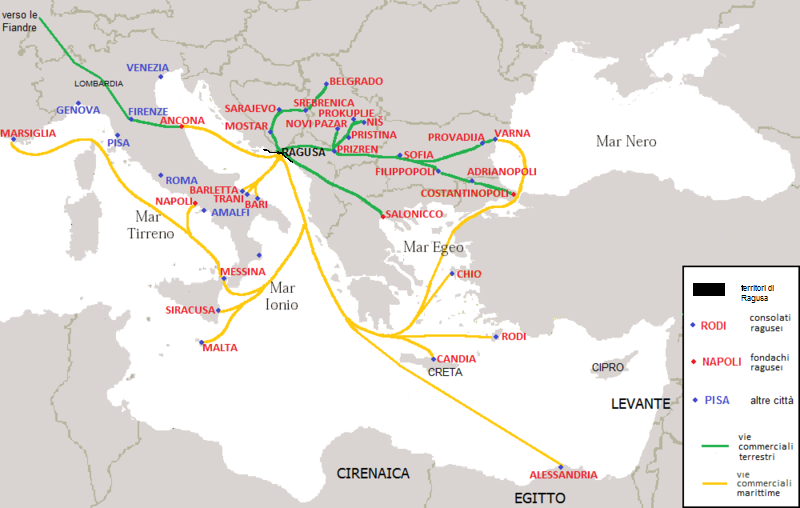
Expansion and trade of Ragusa

=== Gaeta ===
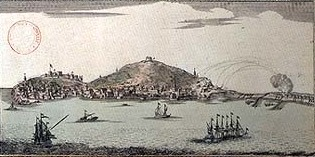
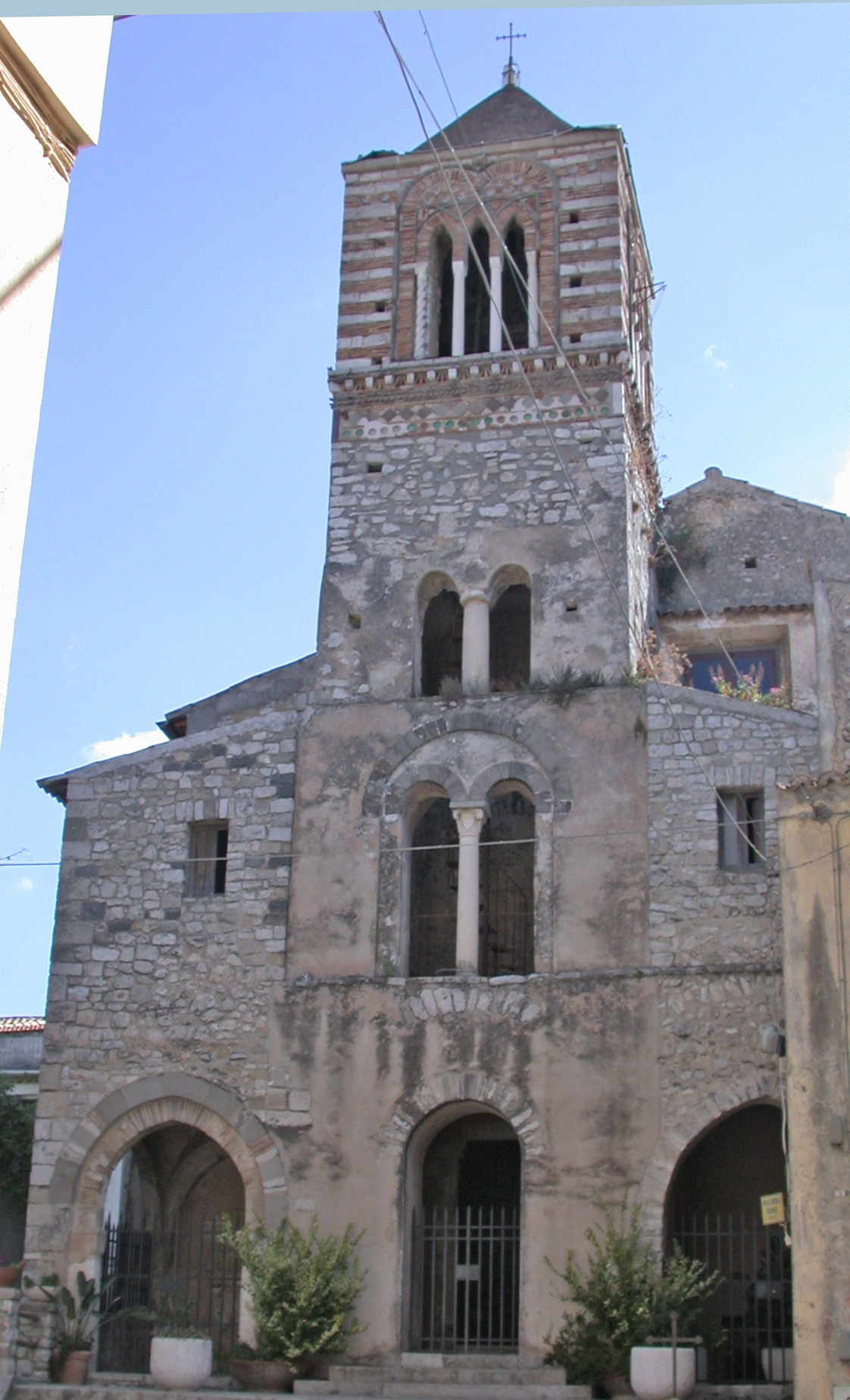
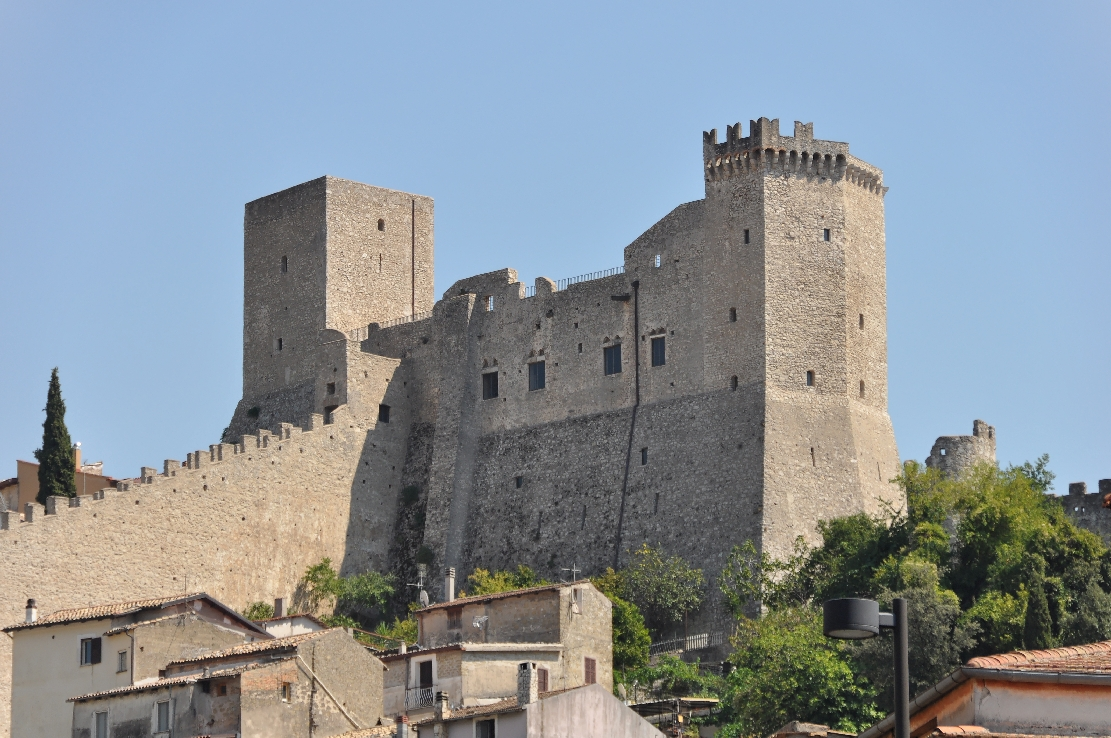
Clockwise from top:
- The Gaetan flag consists of quartered gules and argent
- Prospectus of Gaeta
- The Church of San Michele Arcangelo in Itri
- The Castle of Itri, built by Duke Docibilis I

The Duchy of Gaeta acquired administrative autonomy from the Byzantine Empire in 839, under the co-hypati Constantine and Marinus I of Gaeta. They were supposedly deposed towards 875 by Docibilus I, who inaugurated the Docibile dynasty. By the 10th century, the city would reach the acme of economic, political and artistic power, to the point of being called The Little Venice of the Tyrrhenian. Gaeta traded with the most important Italian cities, had consulates in Barberia, had its own laws and its own currency, the follaro, which was widely diffused in the Italian markets. Gaeta controlled an area roughly corresponding to the western part of the current Province of Latina and for some years had dominion over the Pontine Islands.

Due to the importance of maritime traffic, the duchy adopted a peculiar organization, in which the power of the duke was limited by the weight of the aristocracy and of a people that was becoming ever stronger, more conscious and more prosperous. Freed from a Saracen siege in 846 with the help of Naples and Amalfi, Gaeta defeated the Muslims at Ostia in 849 and on the Garigliano in 915; it also availed itself of their help against Pope John VIII.

In 1032, following a dynastic crisis, the Docibiles, who had reigned up to that moment, had to cede Gaeta to the Principality of Capua. For the following sixty years, independent dukes alternated with Capuan vassals. In 1100, new Norman dukes freed the city and kept it independent until 1135, when the last duke, Richard III, bequeathed it to Roger II of Sicily.

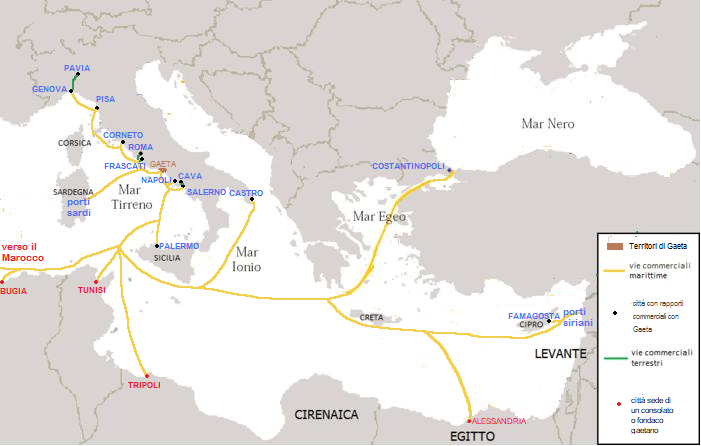
Expansion and trade of Gaeta

=== Noli ===
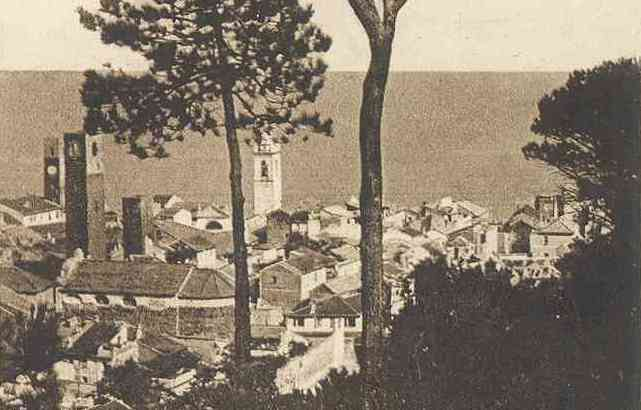
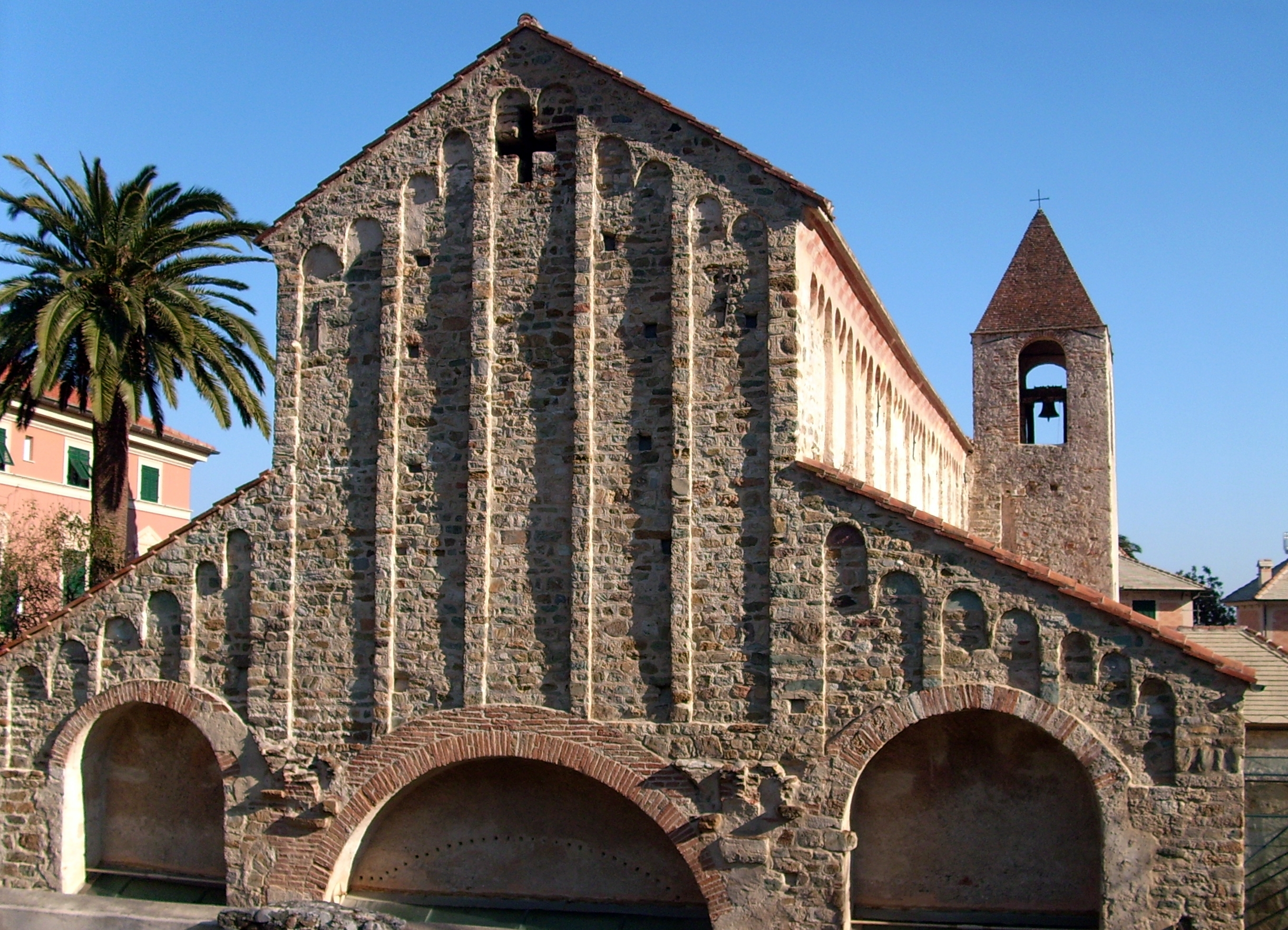
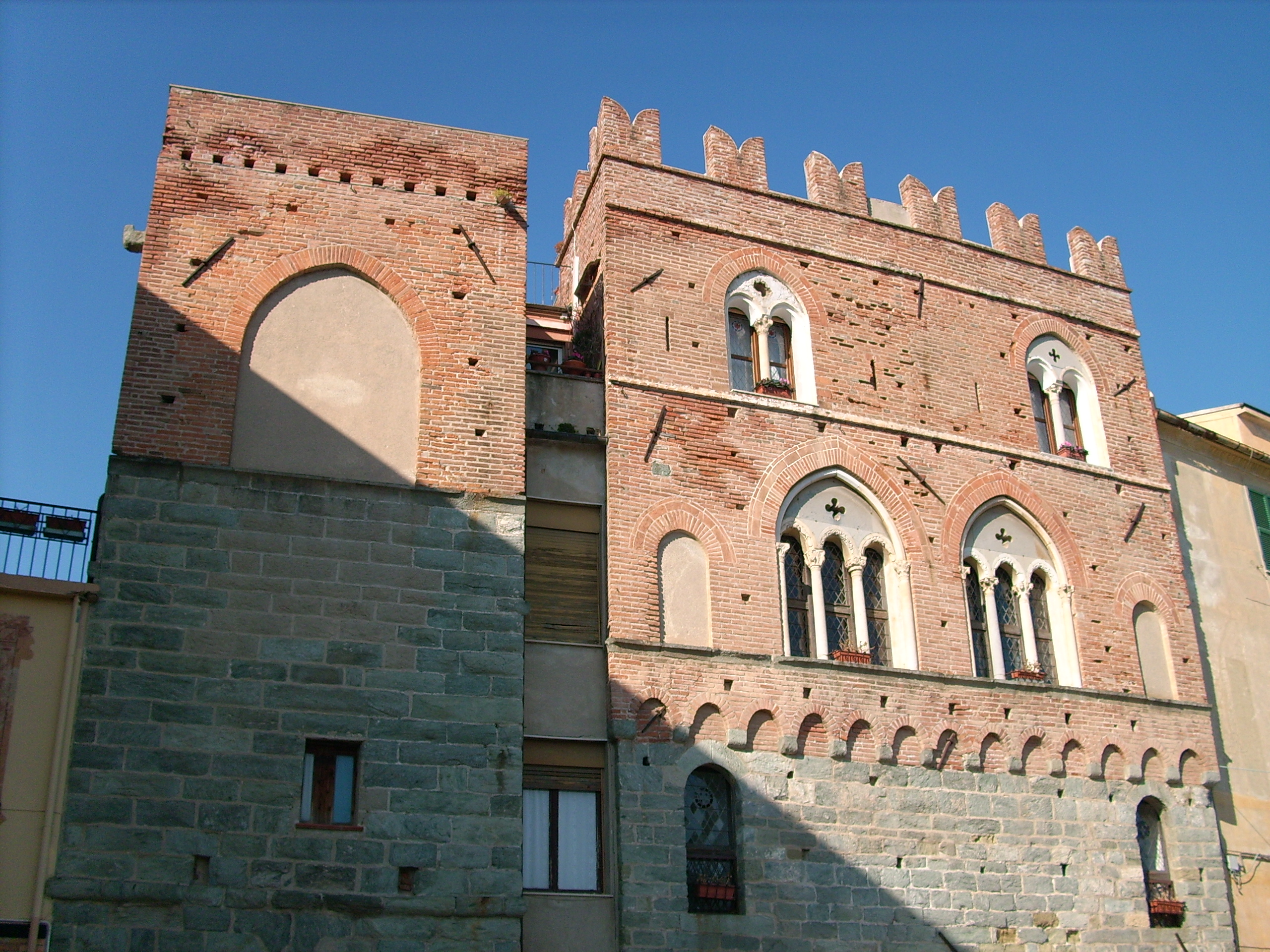
Clockwise from top:
- The Noli flag bears the Cross of San Giovanni Battista
- Panorama di Noli
- San Paragorio
- Palazzo della Loggia

Noli's fortune began with the Crusades: its particular geographical position in fact made it an important port for the construction of ships and the transport of men and provisions directed to the Holy Land. By participating in the Crusades, Noli obtained numerous privileges from the Christian sovereigns of Antioch and Jerusalem and above all enormous wealth, with which it was able to gradually buy the various marquis rights from the Marquises of the Carretto House, on whom it depended. Noli gained complete independence in 1192, made official four years later by Henry VI.

Just ten years after its founding, the consuls of the newborn municipality decided to ally themselves with the nearby and much more powerful Republic of Genoa: in 1202 Noli became its protectorate, a condition that would last for its entire existence. This made Noli an anomalous maritime republic compared to the others: it never minted its own money nor had independent warehouses, relying on the Genoese for these assets, while maintaining total internal independence.

The small republic experienced a period of flourishing expansion throughout the 13th and 14th centuries, in which it built many new towers, built a wall and extended its borders to the neighboring towns of Orco, Mallare, Segno and Vadocittà. A strongly Guelph city, it adhered to the Lombard League against Frederick II and was rewarded for this by Pope Gregory IX with the establishment of the Roman Catholic Diocese of Savona-Noli in 1239 and the donation of the island of Bergeggi.

But the prosperity of Noli was linked to the Crusades: when these ended, its geographical position, so useful in the 13th century, proved unsuitable for the traffic of greater cabotage of 15th-century ships. The people of Noli, cut off from maritime trade, ceased all mercantile activity and they became fishermen. This is another peculiarity of the history of Noli: from 1400 onward, it ceased to be a seafaring state, while retaining its independence for another four centuries.

Commercial isolation was added to continuous wars with the neighboring towns of Savona and Finale Ligure, which condemned Noli to a long decline destined to last until the end of independence, which took place in 1797 with the annexation to the Ligurian Republic.

According to some scholars, the navigator António de Noli, an explorer of the African coasts, was born in Noli, but this is debatable.

== Relations between the maritime republics ==
Relationships between the maritime republics arose from their nature as states dedicated to navigation and maritime commerce. These relationships were often expressed as political or economic agreements aimed at shared profit from a trade route or mutual non-interference. In the first centuries, when they had not yet become strong enough to oppose each other, the maritime republics were often allied in order to free their routes from Saracen corsairs: such allegiances include Genoa and Pisa, Venice and Ancona, and Amalfi and Pisa. The Mahdia campaign of 1087 saw Genoa, Gaeta, Pisa and Amalfi aligned side by side. But this situation was short-lived: after a few decades, the competition for the control of the commercial routes with the East and in the Mediterranean unleashed bloody fratricidal wars and a real selection among the maritime republics. Amalfi would be sacked by Pisa, which would be destroyed by Genoa, which would be defeated by Venice.

=== Venice and Genoa ===
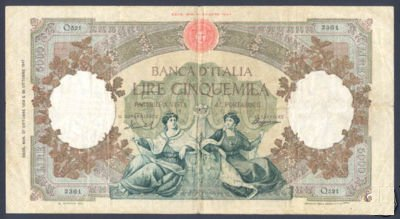
From 1947 to 1963, the 5,000 lira (as well as the 10,000 lira) bore the allegory of the two most powerful and rival maritime republics: Genoa and Venice.

The relationship between Genoa and Venice was almost continuously competitive and hostile, both economically and militarily. Until the beginning of the 13th century, hostilities were limited to rare acts of piracy and isolated skirmishes. In 1218 Venice and Genoa reached an agreement to end the piracy and to safeguard each other. Genoa was guaranteed the right to trade in the eastern imperial lands, a new and profitable market.

==== War of Saint Sabas and the conflict of 1293–99 ====
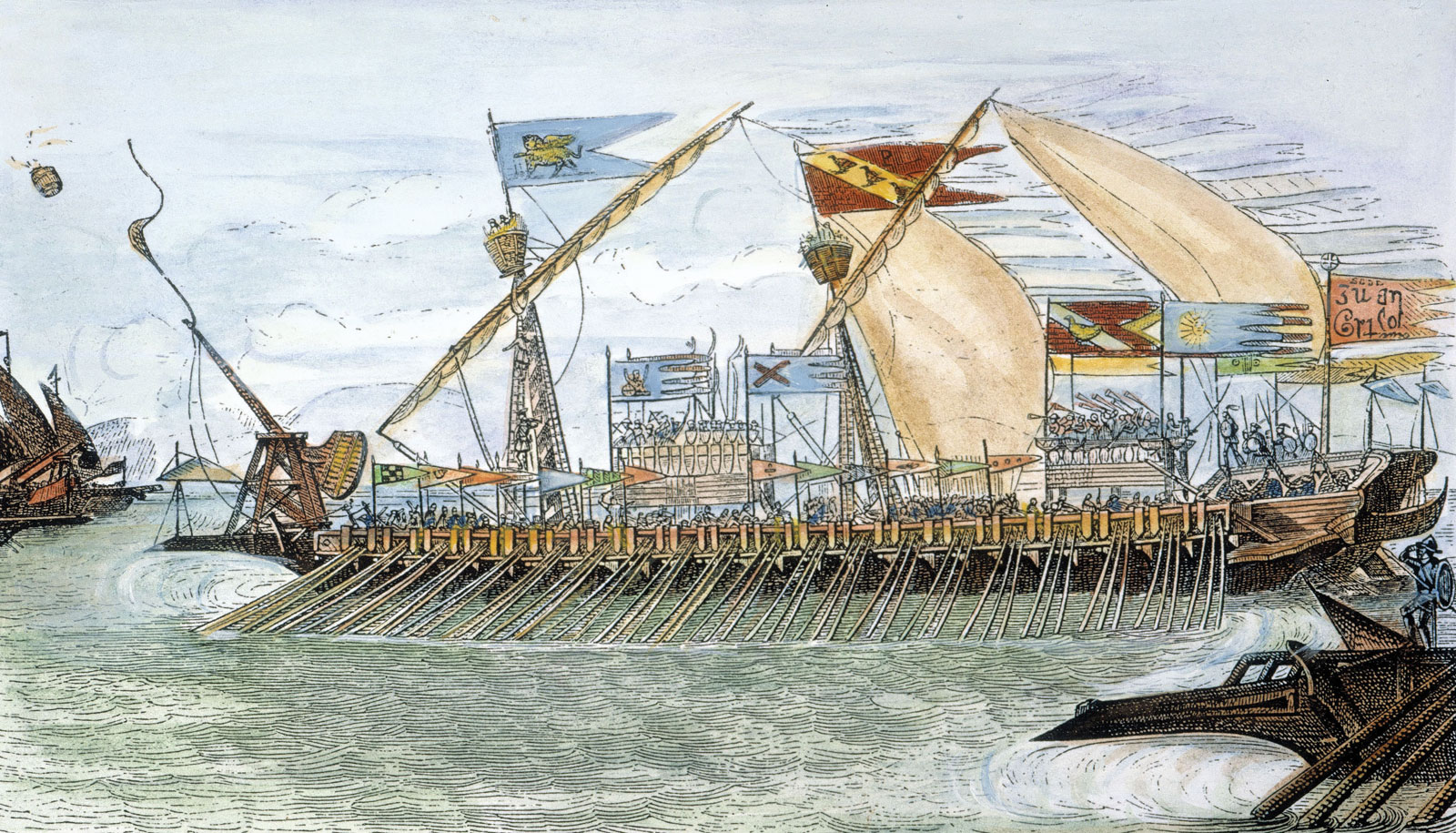
A Venetian galley during the Battle of Curzola (19th century engraving)

The first major conflict between the two republics broke out in the city of Saint-Jean d'Acre over ownership of the Saint Sabas monastery. The Genoese occupied it in 1255, sacked the Venetian neighbourhood and sank the ships docked there. Venice first agreed to an alliance with Pisa regarding their common interests in Syria and Palestine, but then counter-attacked, destroying the fortified monastery. The flight of the Genoese and of the baron Philip of Montfort, ruler of the Christian principality of Syria, concluded the first phase of the punitive expedition.

Just one year later, the three maritime powers clashed in an unequal struggle in the waters facing Saint-Jean d'Acre. Almost all the Genoese galleys were sunk and 1,700 fighters and sailors were killed. The Genoese responded by allying with the Empire of Nicaea, formed by the Byzantines who were driven out of Constantinople by the Venetians during the Fourth Crusade and aimed to take it back. In 1261, the Nicaeans overthrew the Latin Empire of Constantinople, a puppet state of the Venetians that ruled the city. Genoa therefore replaced Venice in the monopoly of commerce with the Black Sea territories. The Battle of Curzola in 1298 saw the capture of Admiral Andrea Dandolo and Marco Polo, and despite Genoa's victory, both rivals were left exhausted.

==== War of the Straits ====
The Genoese expansion in the Black Sea led to the outbreak of a new conflict with Venice, whose fleet, allied with the Eastern Empire and led by Niccolò Pisani, attempted to drive the Genoese from their colony of Galata, but was repelled by Paganino Doria. The two clashed again in the 1352 Battle of the Bosphorus, with an indecisive outcome. In 1353, the Venetians allied with the Aragonese to attack the Genoese city of Alghero in Sardinia: the battle of the Lojera was the greatest Genoese defeat at the time. The Genoese regrouped in 1354 at the islet of Sapientza in the Peloponnese, but were unable to take advantage of the victorious Battle of Sapienza. The following year, the two republics stipulated a not-too-onerous peace, undertaking not to send ships to the Tana for three years.

==== War of Chioggia ====
Towards the end of the 14th century, the Genoese occupied Cyprus and Tenedos, which triggered the Venetians' reaction. After an initial success, the Venetians were defeated in Pula by the Genoese, who occupied Chioggia and laid siege to Venice. But the Venetians managed to set up a new fleet and in turn besiege the Genoese in Chioggia, who were forced to surrender. The 1381 Treaty of Turin, which put an end to the war, caused opposing effects: Genoa, defeated once and for all, was able to keep Cyprus, but took the road of a decline which lasted until the 16th century; Venice, exhausted victor, had to come to terms with its rival's allies and cede Dalmatia to Hungary, but managed to recover in the 15th century.

==== Land battles and gathering in the Holy League ====
The Battle of Lepanto in a painting from the National Maritime Museum, Greenwich, London

Around the mid-15th century, Genoa stipulated an alliance with Florence and Milan, headed by Charles VII of France. Meanwhile, Venice sided with Alfonso V of Aragon, who occupied the throne of Naples. Due to the rivalry of the Italian States, two great coalitions were formed, and foreign intervention in the peninsula steadily increased.

The expansion of the Ottoman Empire after the fall of Constantinople jeopardized the eastern trade of the two republics. Therefore, they abandoned their rivalry to join the Holy League created by Pope Pius V. Most of the Christian fleet consisted of Venetian ships, around 100 galleys. Genoa sailed under the Spanish flag, as the Republic of Genoa lent all its ships to Philip II. The imposing Christian League fleet gathered in the Gulf of Lepanto under the command of the Spaniard John of Austria to clash with the Turkish fleet commanded by Kapudan Ali Pasha. The Battle of Lepanto was fought from midday on 7 October 1571 until the following dawn and ended in victory for the Christian League.

Nonetheless, the Ottoman Empire later made many Genoese and Venetian colonies capitulate and forced the two republics to seek a new destiny: Genoa found it in nascent international finance, and Venice in terrestrial expansion.

=== Genoa and Pisa ===
Genoa and Pisa had many exchanges given their proximity. Initially, relations were one of collaboration and alliance in dealing with the looming and increasingly threatening Muslim expansion. Later, however, rivalries flared up and dominated the western Mediterranean.

==== Allies against the Saracens ====
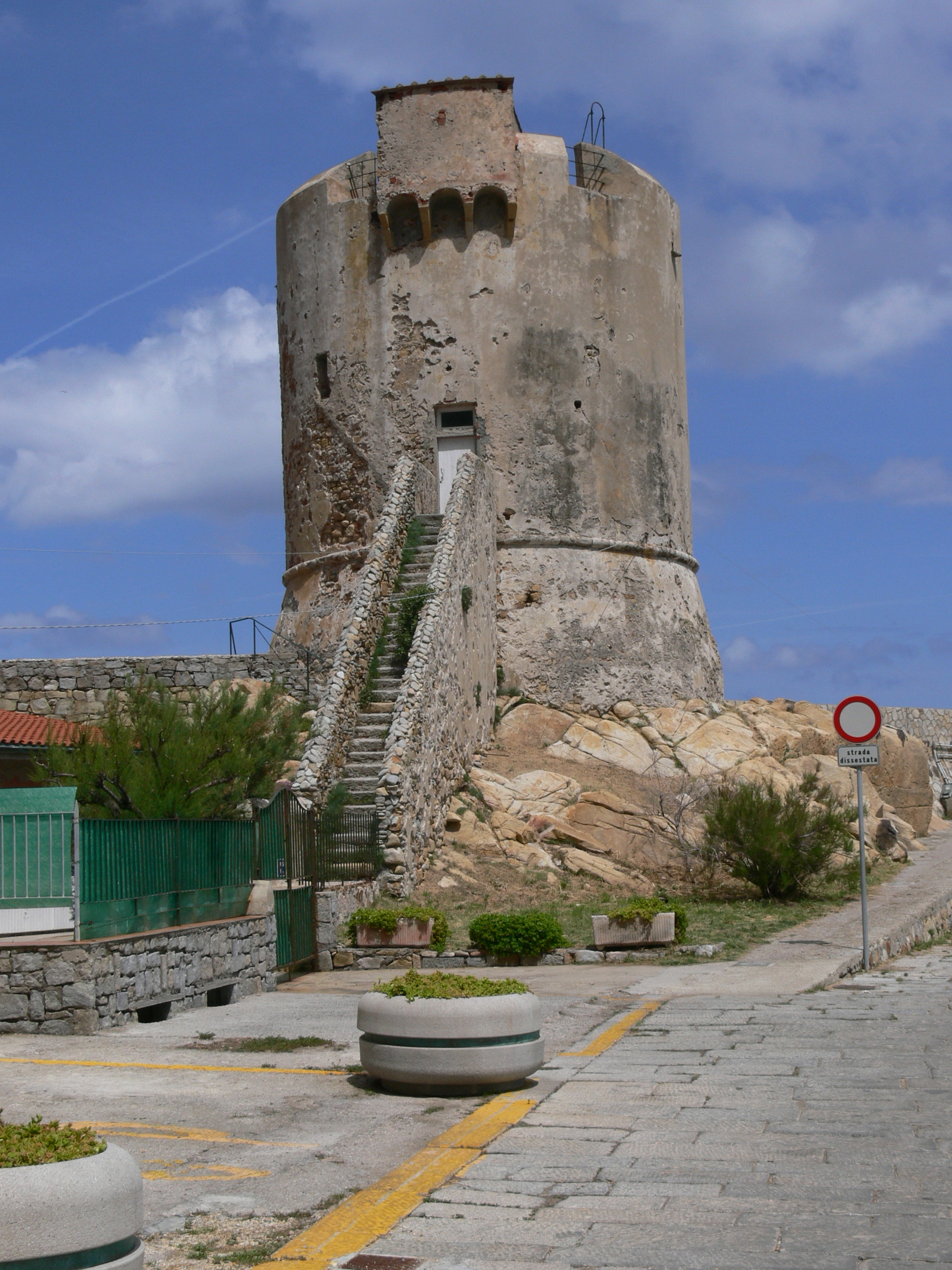
Watchtower in Marciana Marina, Elba, built by the Republic of Pisa as a defence against Saracene pirates

Saracen armies had advanced into Sicily, and were trying to conquer Calabria and Sardinia. To resist them, Genoa and Pisa joined forces to banish the fleet of Mujāhid al-‘Āmirī from the coasts of Sardinia, where it had settled temporarily between 1015 and 1016, threatening the survival of the Sardinian giudicati. Once that was achieved, disputes soon broke out over control of the conquered territories. Due to the limited forces available, the alliance was unable to occupy the large Tyrrhenian island for long.

The many disputes, even the armed ones, were set aside in 1087 when they reunited to fight their common enemy. In the summer of the same year, a massive fleet composed of two hundred galleys from Genoa and Pisa, with some from Gaeta, Salerno and Amalfi, set sail for the Mediterranean coast of Africa. The fleet mounted a successful offensive against Mahdia on 6 August 1087. On 21 April 1092, Pope Gregory VII elevated the archdiocese of Pisa to the rank of metropolitan archdiocese and placed the bishops of Corsica under its authority.

That same victorious expedition persuaded Pope Urban II that a large crusade to liberate the Holy Land would be possible. Around the 1110s, Pope Paschal II asked Pisans and Genoese to organize a crusade in the western Mediterranean. The expedition was very successful and freed the Balearic Islands from the Muslims. As a sign of gratitude, the pope granted many privileges to the two republics. The Pisan archbishop was granted primacy over Sardinia, in addition to Corsica.

==== First war between Pisa and Genoa ====
The papal concessions to the Pisan archbishop greatly increased the Tuscan republic's fame throughout the Mediterranean, but at the same time aroused Genoese envy, which soon developed into clashes for the control of Corsica. Genoa attacked Pisa twice in 1066 and 1070, but was defeated.

The war resumed in 1119 when the Genoese attacked some Pisan galleys, beginning a bloody war on sea and land. It lasted until 1133, interrupted by several truces that were sometimes observed and sometimes violated. The clashes were brought to an end by sharing authority over the Corsican dioceses between the two cities.

==== Second war ====
When Emperor Frederick I Barbarossa came to Italy to oppose the power of the Italian cities, Genoa gave its support to the imperial cause, although with slight reservations, while Pisa made its support conditional on the emperor taking part in the siege of Milan (1162). In 1162 and 1163, Frederick I granted Pisa great privileges, such as control of the Tyrrhenian coast as far as Civitavecchia.

This reignited Genoa's resentment and rivalry, which once again developed into open conflict with clashes of mixed fortunes. Genoa, weakened by factional clashes and wars for control of the Oltregiogo, suffered a series of naval defeats. To remedy this, it made an alliance with Lucca in the mid-1160s: in exchange for a land attack against Pisa in combination with a naval one, the Genoese would build the Motrone Tower for the Luccans along the via Regia, in the area where Viareggio now stands. The alliance between Lucca and Genoa would be renewed at other times, but the tower was then destroyed by the Pisans in 1170 during another series of clashes, in which Florence also intervened to help Pisa.

There was a pause in the conflict on Frederick's fourth descent into Italy, but it resumed soon after his departure. Peace was reached on 6 November 1175 with the return of the Holy Roman Emperor to Italy. The agreement favoured Genoa, expanding its overseas territories. Pisa and Genoa took part in the campaign commanded by Frederick's successor Henry VI against the Kingdom of Sicily.

==== Battle of Giglio ====
In 1241, Pope Gregory IX called a council in Rome to confirm the excommunication of Frederick II; Genoa, then in the hands of the Guelphs, offered to escort the French, Spanish and Lombard prelates to defend them from the Ghibellines, with the help of Venice and the papacy. But the imperial fleet, assisted by that of Pisa, destroyed them between the Isola del Giglio and the island of Montecristo. The Battle of Giglio marked the apex of Ghibelline power.

==== Battle of Meloria and the end of Pisa ====
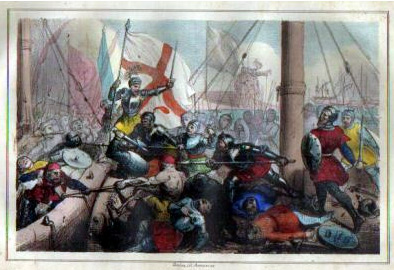
Lithograph of the Battle of Meloria by Armanino

From 1282 to 1284, Genoa and Pisa reverted to fighting each other. The decisive episode of these clashes was the long naval battle of Meloria on 6 August 1284. The Genoese emerged victorious, while the Pisan galleys, receiving no assistance from Count Ugolino, were forced to retreat to the port of Pisa. Prisoners taken by the Genoese were in the order of thousands. Among them was the poet Rustichello da Pisa, who met Marco Polo (captured during the Battle of Curzola) and wrote down the adventures of the Venetian explorer.

The Battle of Meloria greatly reduced the power of the Pisan Republic, which never regained its leading role in the western Mediterranean. Pisa had lost thousands of young men in the battle, causing a population collapse. About fifty years later, Pisan lord Fazio Novello della Gherardesca signed treaties with Genoa. In spite of these, the Genoese assisted the Florentines in the 1406 siege of Pisa, spelling the republic's end.

=== Venice and Pisa ===
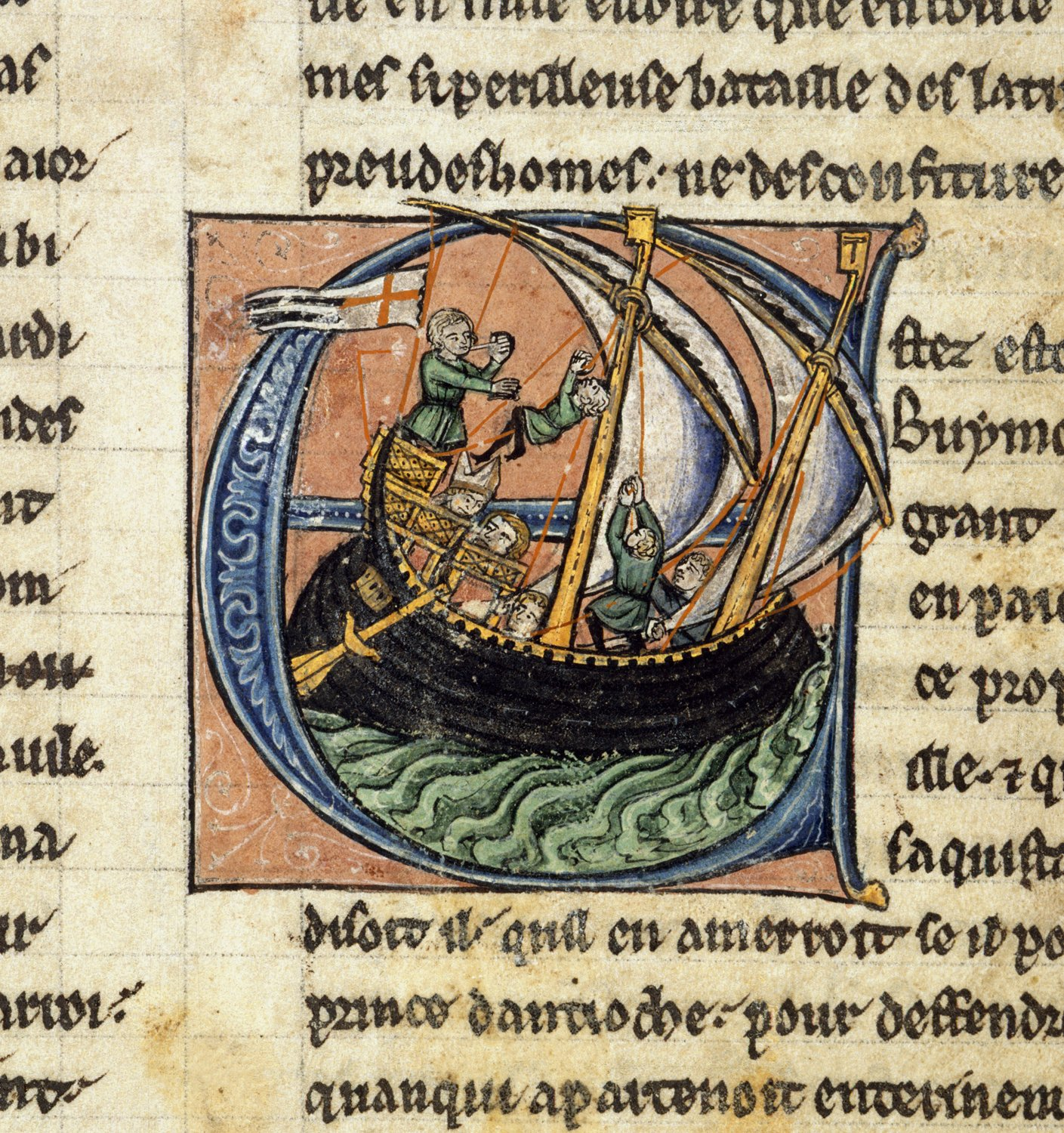
Dagobert sailing in a ship flying St George's cross

The first clash between Pisa and Venice was triggered by competition for participation in the First Crusade. The two republics had moved late: five months after the Crusader conquest of Jerusalem, they had not even reached the Holy Land, but were wintering in the waters of Rhodes, where they came to battle in December 1099. Dagobert of Pisa, commander of the Pisan fleet, was defeated by the Venetian bishop Eugenio Contarini, thus ensuring the Venetian monopoly of trade with Byzantium.

Subsequently, the Venetian fleet contributed to the capture of Haifa while Dagobert became the first Latin Patriarch of Jerusalem and crowned Godfrey as the first Christian King of Jerusalem. Relationships between Pisa and Venice were not always characterized by rivalry and antagonism. Over the centuries, the two republics signed several agreements concerning their zones of influence and action, to avoid hindering each other.

On 13 October 1180, the Doge of Venice and a representative of the Pisan consuls signed an agreement for the reciprocal non-interference in Adriatic and Tyrrhenian affairs, and in 1206 Pisa and Venice concluded a treaty in which they reaffirmed the respective zones of influence. Despite their friendship, Venice did not assist Pisa in its crisis, resulting in the loss of an ally and the strengthening of its rival Genoa.

Between 1494 and 1509, during the siege of Pisa by Florence, Venice went to rescue of the Pisans, following a policy of safeguarding Italian territory from foreign intervention.

=== Amalfi and Pisa ===
Amalfi had already lost complete autonomy beginning in the second half of the 11th century, although it continued running its commercial routes and enjoyed a large degree of administrative autonomy, at least in this period. Under the protection of the Norman William II, third Duke of Apulia, in October 1126 the administrators of Amalfi reached a profitable commercial agreement with neighbouring Pisa, to collaborate in the protection of their common interests in the Tyrrhenian. This agreement was the outcome of a decades-old friendship with the Tuscan republic.

However, Amalfi had no army of its own to protect its commercial interests. Therefore Amalfian ships are not often reported to have been engaged in military action against other maritime republics. In fact it was the Pisan army that broke the pact with Amalfi, by attacking the coastal city on 4 August 1135 during the war waged by Pope Innocent II and the new emperor Lothair II, Holy Roman Emperor, aided by the republics of Genoa and Pisa, against the Norman Roger II of Sicily, who controlled Amalfi. That war ended in favour of Roger II, who gained recognition of his rights over the territories of South Italy, but it was a severe blow for Amalfi, which lost both its fleet and its political autonomy.

=== Amalfi and Gaeta ===
Amalfi and Gaeta were often allied, along with other southern states, to counter the Saracen corsairs. In 846, together with the duchies of Naples and Sorrento, they defeated the Muslims for the first time in the Battle of Licosa. In 849, the two cities joined the Campania League (together with Pope Leo IV, Naples and Sorrento) to defend the port of Ostia and therefore Rome from the Saracen invasion. The Battle of Ostia is considered by some eminent historians to be the first real military league between Italian states and the greatest victory of a Christian fleet over the Muslims until the Battle of Lepanto.

But the definitive victory over the Muslims came in 915, when Amalfi and Gaeta formed the Roman League with Pope John X, Naples, Capua, Salerno, Benevento, the Kingdom of Italy and the Byzantine Empire and won the decisive Battle of Garigliano, in which they destroyed the large Arab-Berber colony of Garigliano and blocked Muslim expansion in Italy. Finally, in 1087, Amalfi and Gaeta combined their fleets with those of Pisa, Genoa and Salerno and successfully attacked the Tunisian port of Mahdia.

The two republics always maintained excellent relations with the Islamic countries despite the repression of privateering, as the Saracens were not subjects of emirs or caliphs. The Islamic countries were the main trading partners of the two duchies and they could, depending on the circumstances, be useful for preserving the duchies' independence against the Greek or the German emperor.

=== Venice, Ancona and Ragusa ===
Although Venice and Ancona had been allied against the Saracens in the 11th century, the commercial competition of Venice on one side and Ancona with Ragusa on the other soon prevailed, since all three cities overlooked the Adriatic Sea. On more than one occasion it came to open confrontation: Venice, aware of its greater economic and military power, disliked competition from other maritime cities in the Adriatic. To resist Venetian rule, Ancona and Ragusa made multiple and lasting alliances, almost a federation.

In 1173, Venice joined forces with Frederick I Barbarossa's imperial army to besiege Ancona. The Venetians blocked Ancona's port, while the imperial troops surrounded the city from the ground. After a few months of dramatic resistance, the Anconitans, supported by the Byzantines, managed to send a small squad to Emilia-Romagna. They enlisted the aid of troops from Ferrara and Bertinoro, who drove out the Venetian-imperial troops. The Treaty of Venice, among other measures, regulated the relations between the forces participating in the siege of Ancona. About twenty years later, in 1195, ships from Pisa and Ancona attempted to free navigation in the Adriatic from Venetian control, but were put to flight and chased as far as Constantinople.

In the 13th century, the tensions continued: Venice took possession of Ragusa in 1205 and therefore directed its destinies for more than a century, slowing down its maritime expansion. Ragusa reacted by developing a dense network of commercial relations with the interior of the Balkan peninsula. Some recent studies consider the Venetian period of Ragusa not a real subjection, but a sort of protectorate. Furthermore, in 1277 the Venetians attacked the port of Ancona, however suffering a resounding defeat: thus a new war began, which ended in 1281 with the Treaty of Ravenna. The 14th century saw the end of the Venetian domination of Ragusa in 1358, which was thus able to reconfirm its ancient alliance with Ancona.

=== Pisa and Ancona ===
Relations between the two maritime republics of central Italy varied greatly depending on the circumstances: they fought in the War of Saint Sabas, but allied themselves against Venice twice, in 1195 and in 1257.

=== Noli and Genoa ===
Noli was a Genoese protectorate from 1202 to the end of its independence, a choice that allowed it not to be crushed by the immense superiority of its neighbour, albeit with some conditioning in foreign policy. Noli reciprocated the protection by helping Genoa in its wars against Pisa and Venice.

== Regatta of the Historical Marine Republics ==
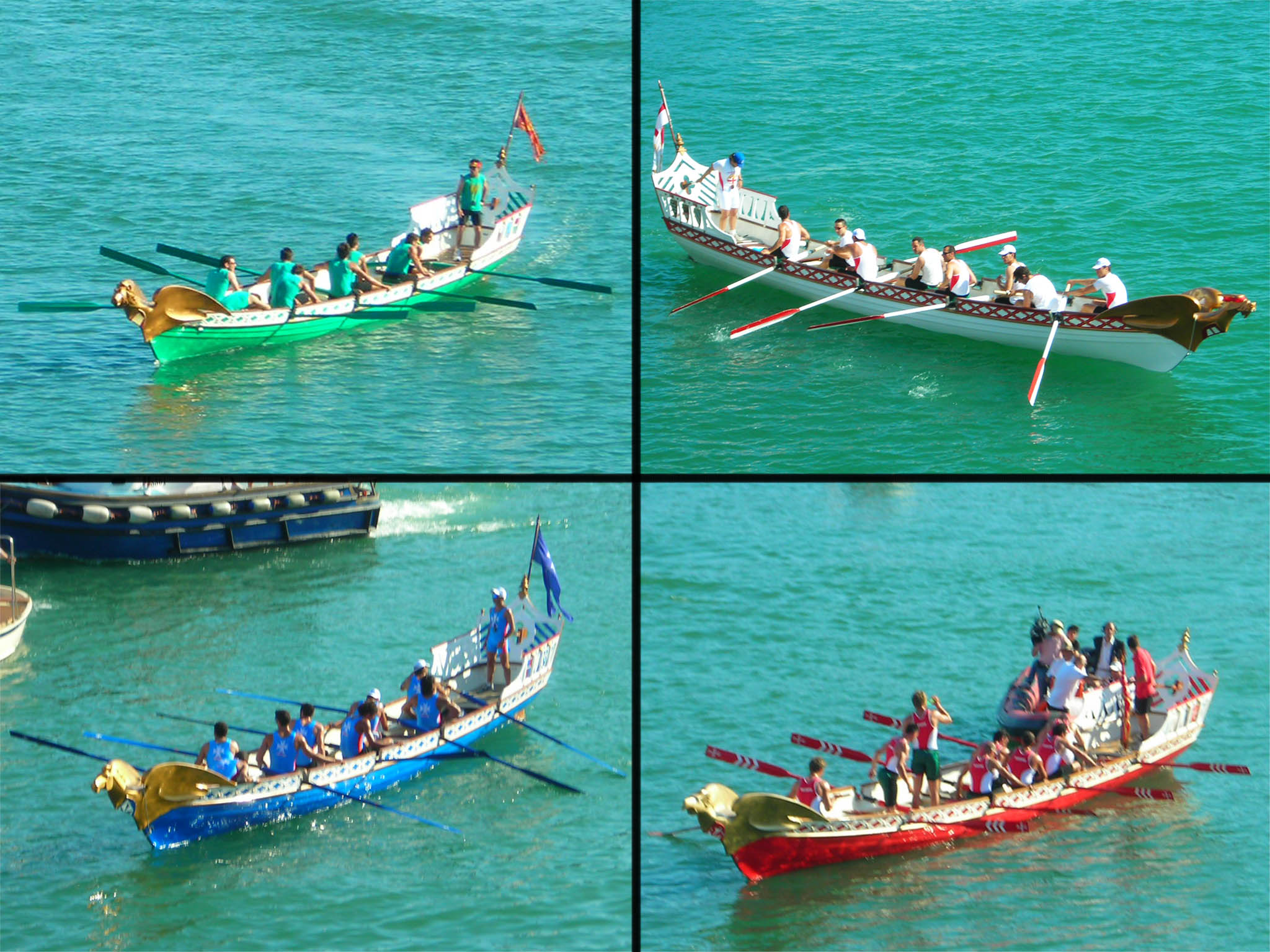
The four boats participating in the Regatta

In 1955, to commemorate the glorious deeds of the four best-known maritime republics, the municipal administrations of Venice, Genoa, Amalfi and Pisa decided to establish the Regatta of the Historical Marine Republics, a rowing competition preceded by a historical procession.

The event takes place annually between the end of May and the beginning of July, and is hosted on a rotating basis in the aforementioned cities. To date, the team with the most victories according to the roll of honor is Venice, followed by Amalfi, Genoa, and Pisa.

== See also ==
- Italian city-states
- Dalmatian city-states
- List of historic states of Italy
- Outremer
- Hanseatic League
- Thalassocracy
- Aristocratic republic

== Bibliography ==
Maritime republics

- Adolf Schaube, Storia del commercio dei popoli latini del Mediterraneo sino alla fine delle Crociate, Unione tipografico-editrice Torinese, 1915
- Armando Lodolini, Le repubbliche del mare, edizioni Biblioteca di storia patria, (Ente per la diffusione e l'educazione storica), Rome 1967
- G. Benvenuti, Le Repubbliche Marinare. Amalfi, Pisa, Genova, Venezia, Newton & Compton editori, Roma 1998.
- Marc'Antonio Bragadin, Storia delle Repubbliche marinare, Odoya, Bologna 2010, 240 pp., ISBN 978-88-6288-082-4.

Duchy of Amalfi

- Umberto Moretti, La prima repubblica marinara d'Italia: Amalfi: con uno studio critico sulla scoperta della bussola nautica, A. Forni, 1998

Republic of Genoa

- Aldo Padovano; Felice Volpe, La grande storia di Genova, Artemisia Progetti Editoriali, 2008, Vol. 2, pp. 84, 91
- Carlo Varese, Storia della repubblica di Genova: dalla sua origine sino al 1814, Tipografia d'Y. Gravier, 1836

Republic of Pisa

- Gino Benvenuti, Storia della Repubblica di Pisa: le quattro stagioni di una meravigliosa avventura, Giardini, 1961

Republic of Venice

- Alvise Zorzi, La repubblica del leone: Storia di Venezia, Bompiani 2002
- Samuele Romanin, Storia documentata di Venezia editore Naratovich 1854

Republic of Ancona

- Various authors, Ancona repubblica marinara, Federico Barbarossa e le Marche; Città di Castello, Arti grafiche, 1972

Republic of Ragusa

- Sergio Anselmi e Antonio Di Vittorio, Ragusa e il Mediterraneo: ruolo e funzioni di una repubblica marinara tra Medioevo ed età Moderna, Cacucci, 1990
