= Torre dello Sperone =

Medieval tower in Cagliari, Italy

Coordinates: 39.2186°N 9.1117°E

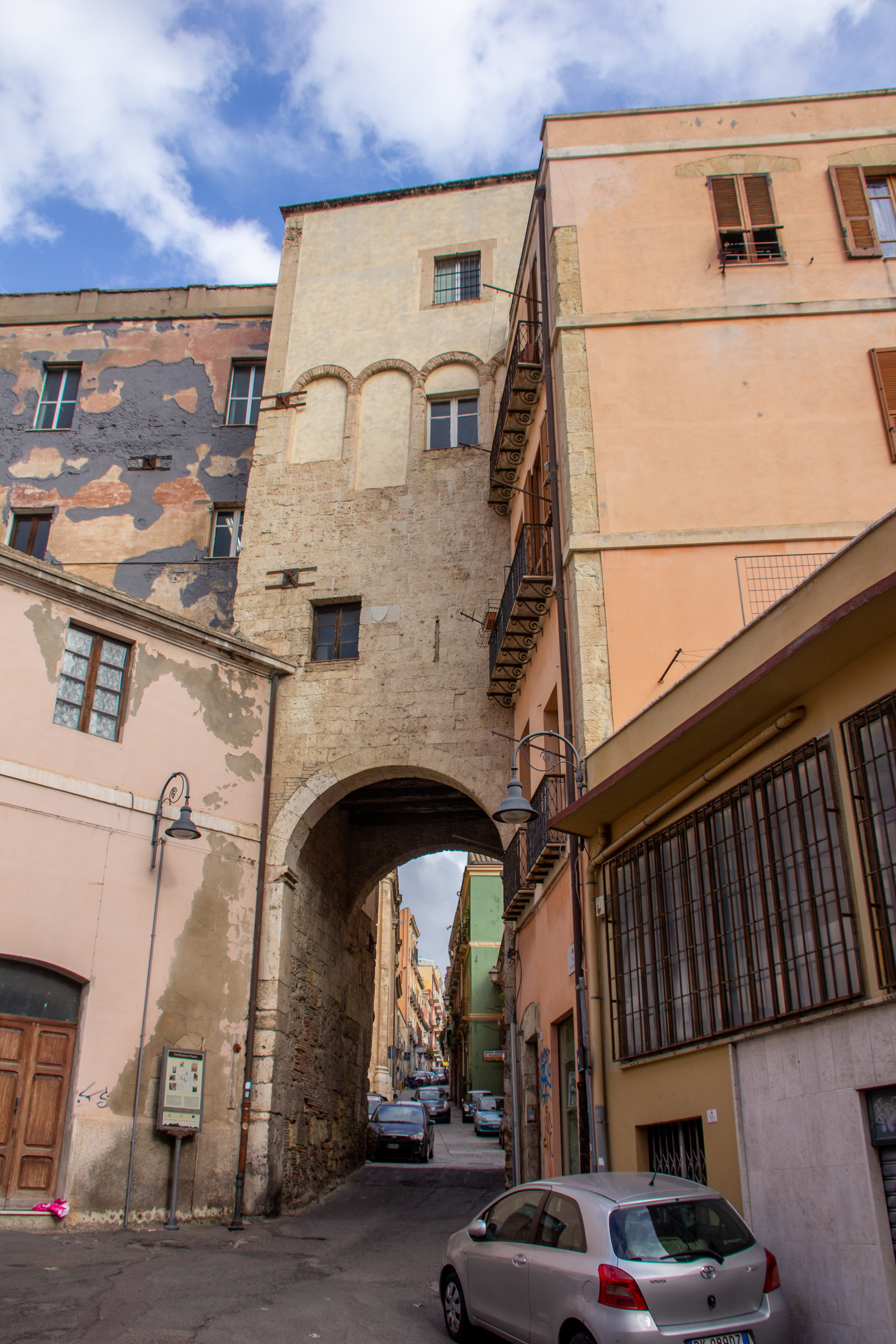
The Tower with its gate

The Torre dello Sperone is a medieval tower in Cagliari, southern Sardinia, Italy. It is located in the Stampace historical quarter of the city.

The tower was part of the city's fortifications built in white limestone by the Pisan in the 13th century. A Latin inscription on the facade of the tower state that the tower was completed in March 1293 during the government of the Captain of the people Alberti.

In Nomine Domini Amen. Hoc hopus fuit perfectum tempore capitaneatus Domini gratiae Alberti capitanei comunis et populi Castelli Castri currentibus annis MCCLXXXXIII mense martii

— The latin inscription on the facade of the tower

== Sources ==
- Giancarlo Sorgia. Cagliari. La suggestione delle epigrafi. Cagliari, Edizioni della Torre, 1993. ISBN 88 7343 2530
